= Khazars =

Historical semi-nomadic Turkic ethnic group

Khazar Khaganate
- c. 650–969
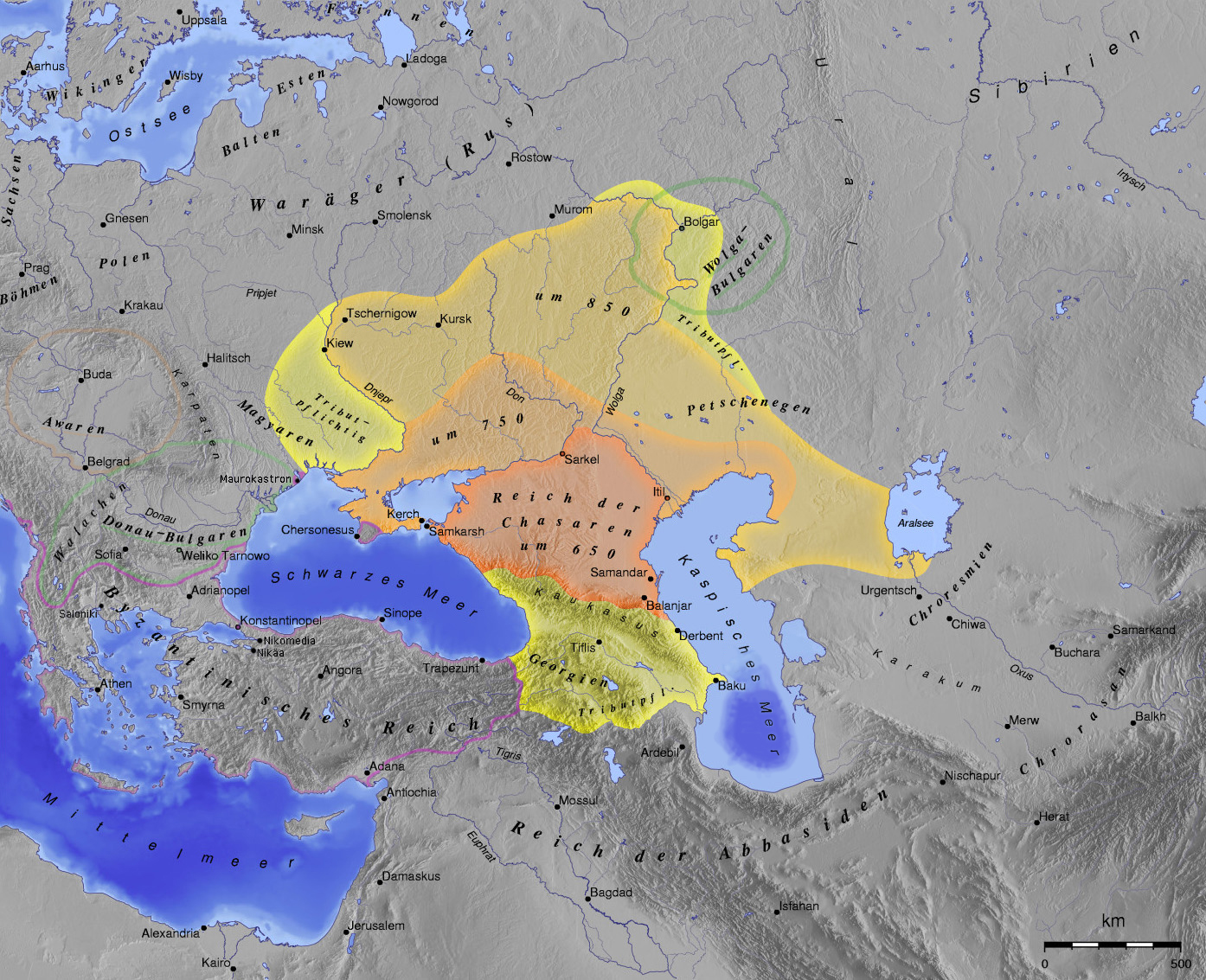
- Khazar Khaganate, 650–850
- Status: Khaganate
- Capital: Balanjar (c. 650 – c. 720); Samandar (720–750); Atil (750 – c. 965–969)
- Common languages: Oghuric (lingua franca); Old Turkic (dynastic, spoken); Alanian (spoken)
- Religion: Judaism (official religion of Khazaria since the reign of Khan Bulan); Tengrism; Christianity; Islam; Paganism; Religious syncretism
- Qaghan
  - c. 650: Irbis
  - 8th century: Bulan
  - 9th century: Obadiah
  - 9th century: Zachariah
  - 9th century: Manasseh
  - 9th century: Benjamin
  - 10th century: Aaron
  - 10th century: Joseph
  - 10th century: David
  - 11th century: Georgios
- Historical era: Middle Ages
  - Established: c. 650
  - Sviatoslav's sacking and razing of Atil: 969

Area
- 850 est.: 3,000,000 km^{2} (1,200,000 sq mi)
- 900 est.: 1,000,000 km^{2} (390,000 sq mi)
- Currency: Yarmaq
Preceded by
Western Turkic Khaganate
Old Great Bulgaria
Succeeded by
Cumania
Pechenegs
Kievan Rus'
Durdzuks
Volga Bulgaria
Alania

The Khazars (Note: Greek: Χάζαροι Kházaroi; Hebrew: כּוּזָרִים, romanised: Kūzārīm; Old East Slavic: коꙁаре, romanised: kozare; Church Slavonic: коꙁари, romanised: kozari; (Note: "The Gazari are, presumably, the Khazars, although this term or the Kozary of the perhaps near contemporary Vita Constantini ... could have reflected any of a number of peoples within Khazaria." (Golden 2007b, p. 139)) Latin: Gazari, or Gasani; (Note: "Somewhat later, however, in a letter to the Byzantine Emperor Basil I, dated to 871, Louis the German, clearly taking exception to what had apparently become Byzantine usage, declares that 'we have not found that the leader of the Avars, or Khazars (Gasanorum)'..." (Golden 2001a, p. 33)) Chinese: 突厥曷薩 Tūjué Hésà; 突厥可薩 Tūjué Kěsà, lit. 'Türk Khazar') (/kəˈzɑːrz/) were a semi-nomadic Turkic people who established a major commercial empire in the late 6th century CE spanning the south of modern European Russia, southern Ukraine, and western Kazakhstan. It was the most powerful polity to emerge from the break-up of the Western Turkic Khaganate. Astride a major artery of commerce between Eastern Europe and West Asia, Khazaria became one of the foremost trading empires of the early medieval world, commanding the western marches of the Silk Road and playing a key commercial role as a crossroad between China, West Asia, and Kievan Rus'. For some three centuries (c. 650–965), the Khazars dominated the vast area extending from the Volga-Don steppes to the eastern Crimea and the northern Caucasus.

Although they were a confederation of different Turkic-speaking peoples, the precise origins and nature of the Khazars are uncertain, since there is no surviving record in the Khazar language and the state was multilingual and polyethnic. Their native religion is thought to have been Tengrism, like that of the North Caucasian Huns and other Turkic peoples, although their multiethnic population seems to have included pagans, Jews, Christians, and Muslims. Although there is evidence that the ruling elite of the Khazars had converted to Rabbinic Judaism in the 8th century, the scope of the conversion to Judaism within the khanate remains uncertain.

== Effects ==
The Khazars are variably believed to have contributed to the ethnogenesis of numerous peoples, including the Hazaras, Hungarians, Kazakhs, the Don and Zaporozhian Cossacks, Kumyks, Krymchaks, Crimean Karaites, Csángós, Mountain Jews, and Subbotniks. The late 19th century saw the emergence of the Khazar myth, the theory that the core of today's Ashkenazi Jews are descended from a hypothetical Khazarian Jewish diaspora that migrated westward into France and Germany. Linguistic and genetic studies have not supported the theory, and despite occasional support, most scholars view it with considerable skepticism. The theory is sometimes associated with antisemitism.

In Oghuz Turkic languages, as well as in Iran, the Caspian Sea is still named the "Khazar Sea".

== Etymology ==
Gyula Németh, following Zoltán Gombocz, derived Khazar from a hypothetical *Qasar reflecting a Turkic root qaz- ("to ramble, to roam") being an hypothetical retracted variant of Common Turkic kez-; however, András Róna-Tas objected that *qaz- is a ghost word. In the fragmentary Tes and Terkhin inscriptions of the Uyğur empire (744–840) the form Qasar is attested, although uncertainty remains whether this represents a personal or tribal name, gradually other hypotheses emerged. Louis Bazin derived it from Turkic qas- ("tyrannise, oppress, terrorise") on the basis of its phonetic similarity to the Uyğur tribal name, Qasar. (Note: Golden 2007a, p. 16 and n.38 citing L. Bazin, "Pour une nouvelle hypothèse sur l'origine des Khazar", in Materialia Turcica, 7/8 (1981–1982): 51–71.) Róna-Tas connects qasar with Kesar, the Pahlavi transcription of the Roman title Caesar. (Note: Compare Tibetan dru-gu Ge-sar (the Turk Gesar)(Golden 2007a, p. 16) or Phrom Ge-sar, who was possibly inspired by Fromo Kesaro (拂菻罽娑 standard Chinese: Fúlǐn Jìsuō < Middle Chinese: *pʰɨut̚ -liɪm^{X} kˠiᴇi^{H}-sɑ), a king of the Turk Shahis of mixed Hephthalite-Western Turkic origins (Rezakhani 2017, Kim 2016, pp. 58–59, Inaba & Balogh 2020, p. 106, Kordosis 2017, pp. 183–192).)

D. M. Dunlop tried to link the Chinese term for "Khazars" to one of the tribal names of the Uyğur, or Toquz Oğuz, namely the Qasar (Ch. 葛薩 Gésà). The objections are that Uyğur 葛薩 Gésà/Qasar was not a tribal name but rather the surname of the chief of the 思结 Sijie tribe (Sogdian: Sikari) of the Toquz Oğuz (Ch. 九姓 jĭu xìng), (Note: Sijie 思結 (also 斯結) was mentioned as a 鐵勒 Tiele, later Toquz Oghuz tribe, and distinguished from 突厥 Tujue in Chinese sources such as Old Book of Tang, New Book of Tang or Tang Huiyao. However, in other sources Sijie were also associated with Tujue (Saka Ttrūka): Zizhi Tongjian mentioned the Tujue Sijie 突厥思結 and Tang Huiyao also counted 思結 Sijie (rendered as 恩結 Enjie) among the Eastern Turkic tribes living south of the Gobi desert. A saikairä ttūrkä chārä (< *sïqïr türk čor) was also mentioned in a Khotanese Saka text about Turks in Ganzhou.) and that in Middle Chinese the ethnonym "Khazars" was always prefaced with Tūjué, then still reserved for Göktürks and their splinter groups, (Tūjué Kěsà bù:突厥可薩部; Tūjué Hésà:突厥曷薩) and "Khazar's" first syllable is transcribed with different characters (可 and 曷) than 葛, which is used to render the syllable Qa- in the Uyğur word Qasar. (Note: Kěsà (可薩) would have been pronounced something like k^{h}a'sat in both Early Middle Chinese/EMC and Late Middle Chinese/LMC, while Hésà 葛 (曷薩) would yield ɣat-sat in (EMC) and xɦat sat (LMC) respectively, where final "t" often transcribes –r- in foreign words. Thus, while these Chinese forms could transcribe a foreign word of the type *Kasar/*Kazar, *Ġatsar, *Ġazar, *Ġasar, there is a problem phonetically with assimilating these to the Uyğur word Qasar 葛薩 (Standard Chinese Gesa < EMC/LMC *Kat-sat= *Kar sar= *Kasar).) While it is far from given that the Khazars are not signifying a multi-ethnic and multi-lingual cluster of peoples and clans, some more nomadic, some less, it doesn't exclude that some clans, or splintergroups, or even rulers has identified with the name(s) of the Khazars, in the variety of ways it has been expressed.

After their conversion it is reported that they adopted the Hebrew script, (Note: Ibn al-Nadīm commenting on script systems in 987–88 recorded that the Khazars wrote in Hebrew (Golden 2007b, p. 148).) and it is likely that, although speaking a Turkic language, the Khazar chancellery under Judaism probably corresponded in Hebrew. (Note: "The chancellery of the Jewish state of the Khazars is therefore also likely to have used Hebrew writing even if the official language was a Turkic one." (Erdal 2007, pp. 98–99))

== Linguistics ==
Determining the origins and nature of the Khazars is closely bound with theories of their languages, but analysis of their languages' origins is difficult, since no indigenous records in the Khazar language survive, and the state was polyglot and polyethnic. (Note: "there must have been many different ethnic groups within the Khazar realm ... These groups spoke different languages, some of them no doubt belonging to the Indo-European or different Caucasian language families." (Erdal 2007, p. 75, n.2)) (Note: The high chancery official of the Abbasid Caliphate under Al-Wathiq, Sallām the interpreter (Sallam al-tardjuman), famous for his reputed mastery of thirty languages, might have been both Jewish and a Khazar Wasserstein 2007, pp. 376, and n.2, referring to Dunlop 1954, pp. 190–193.) Whereas the royal or ruling elite probably spoke an eastern variety of the Common Turkic, the subject tribes appear to have spoken varieties of Oghuric languages, a language variously identified with the Bulgar, Chuvash, and the Hunnic language.

The latter is based upon the assertion of the Persian historian Istakhri that the Khazar language was different from any other known tongue, although his account also likened it to Bulğaric. Alano-As was also widely spoken. Eastern Common Turkic, the language of the royal house and its core tribes, in all likelihood remained the language of the ruling elite in the same way that Mongol continued to be used by the rulers of the Golden Horde, alongside of the Kipchak languages spoken by the bulk of the Turkic tribesmen that constituted the military force of this part of the Činggisid empire. Similarity, Oğuric, like Qipčaq Turkic in the Jočid realm, functioned as one of the languages of government. One method for tracing their origins consists in the analysis of the possible etymologies behind the ethnonym "Khazar".

== History ==
For most of its history, Khazaria served as a buffer state between the Byzantine Empire, the nomads of the northern steppes, and the Umayyad and Abbasid Caliphates, having previously been Byzantium's proxy against the rival Sasanian Empire. Around 900, the Byzantines began encouraging the Alans to attack Khazaria; this move aimed to weaken Khazar control over Crimea and the Caucasus and facilitate imperial diplomacy and proselytising towards the powerful Kievan Rus' in the north. By 969, Sviatoslav I of Kiev, the ruler of Kievan Rus', along with his allies, conquered the Khazar capital of Atil, ushering the decline and disintegration of Khazaria by the mid 11th century.

=== Legendary origins ===
Joseph, one of the Khazar rulers, wrote in his Reply to Hasdai ibn Shaprut, that the Khazars were descendants of "Kozar", one of the ten sons of Togarmah (the others being Uygur, Tiros, Avar, Oguz, Bisal, Tarna, Sanar, Bulgar, and Savir).

=== Tribal origins and early history ===
The tribes (Note: "The word tribe is as troublesome as the term clan. It is commonly held to denote a group, like the clan, claiming descent from a common (in some culture zones eponymous) ancestor, possessing a common territory, economy, language, culture, religion, and sense of identity. In reality, tribes were often highly fluid sociopolitical structures, arising as 'ad hoc responses to ephemeral situations of competition,' as Morton H. Fried has noted." (Golden 2001b, p. 78)) that were to comprise the Khazar empire were not an ethnic union, but a congeries of steppe nomads and peoples who came to be subordinated, and subscribed to a core Turkic leadership. Many Turkic groups, such as Oghuric speakers, including the Saragurs, Oğurs, Onogurs, and Bulgars, who earlier formed part of the Tiele (Tiělè) confederation, are attested quite early, having been driven west by the Sabirs, who in turn fled the Pannonian Avars, and began to flow into the Volga–Caspian–Pontic zone from as early as the 4th century and are recorded by Priscus to reside in the western Eurasian Steppe as early as 463. They appear to stem from Mongolia and South Siberia in the aftermath of the fall of the Hunnic-Xiōngnú nomadic polities. A variegated tribal federation led by these Turks, probably comprising a complex assortment of Iranian peoples, (Note: Dieter Ludwig, in his doctoral thesis Struktur und Gesellschaft des Chazaren-Reiches im Licht der schriftlichen Quellen, (Münster, 1982) suggested that the Khazars were Turkic members of the Hephthalite Empire, where the lingua franca was a variety of Iranian (Golden 2007a, pp. 40–41; Brook 2010, p. 4).) proto-Mongols, Uralic speakers, and Paleosiberian peoples vanquished the Rouran Khaganate of the hegemonic Pannonian Avars in 552 who swept westwards, taking in their train other steppe nomads and peoples from Sogdia.

The ruling family of this confederation may have hailed from the Ashina tribe of the Western Turkic Khaganate, although Constantin Zuckerman regards Ashina and their pivotal role in the formation of the Khazars with scepticism. (Note: "The reader should be warned that the A-shih-na link of the Khazar dynasty, an old phantom of ... Khazarology, will ... lose its last claim to reality" (Zuckerman 2007, p. 404).) Golden notes that Chinese and Arabic reports are almost identical, making the connection a strong one, and conjectures that their leader may have been Irbis Seguy, who lost power or was killed around 651. Moving west, the confederation reached the land of the Akatziri, (Note: In this view, the name Khazar would derive from a hypothetical *Aq Qasar (Golden 2006, pp. 89–90): e.g. Pritsak (1978) links Ak-Katzirs (< Άκατζίροι) to the name Khazar, though he explains that the polity was named Khazar because the Ashina-ruled Western Turks, after losing their territories to Tang Chinese, took over the territory formerly occupied by the Akatziri (Pritsak 1978, p. 261). However, the hypothesised link between the Akatizoi and the Khazars was not solid, being based on mere phonetic resemblance (Golden 2011b, p. 136, Brook 2006, p. 10).) who had been important allies of Byzantium in fighting off Attila's army.

=== Rise of the Khazar state ===
The Khazar Khaganate and contemporary polities circa 800.

An embryonic state of Khazaria began to form sometime after 630, when it emerged from the breakdown of the larger First Turkic Khaganate of the Göktürks. Göktürk armies had penetrated the Volga by 549, ejecting the Avars, who were then forced to flee to the sanctuary of the Pannonian Basin. The Ashina clan appeared on the scene by 552, when they overthrew the Rourans and established the First Turkic Khaganate, whose self designation was Tür(ü)k. (Note: Whittow states that the word Türk had no strict ethnic meaning at the time: "Throughout the early middle ages on the Eurasian steppes, the term 'Turk' may or may not imply membership of the ethnic group of Turkic peoples, but it does always mean at least some awareness and acceptance of the traditions and ideology of the Gök Türk empire, and a share, however distant, in the political and cultural inheritance of that state." (Whittow 1996, p. 221)) By 568, these Göktürks were probing for an alliance with Byzantium to attack the Sasanian Empire. An internecine war broke out between the senior eastern Göktürks and the junior Western Turkic Khaganate some decades later, when on the death of Taspar Qaghan, a succession dispute led to a dynastic crisis between Taspar's chosen heir, the Apa Qaghan, and the ruler appointed by the tribal high council, Āshǐnà Shètú, the Ishbara Qaghan.

By the first decades of the 7th century, the Ashina Tong Yabghu Qaghan managed to stabilise the Western division. Upon his death, after providing crucial military assistance to Byzantium in routing the Sasanian army in the Persian heartland, the Western Turkic Qağanate dissolved under pressure from the encroaching Tang dynasty armies and split into two competing federations, each consisting of five tribes, collectively known as the "Ten Arrows" (On Oq). Both briefly challenged Tang hegemony in eastern Turkestan. To the West, two new nomadic states arose in the meantime: Old Great Bulgaria under Kubrat, the Duōlù clan leader, and the Nǔshībì subconfederation, also comprising five tribes. (Note: The Duōlù (咄陆) were the left wing of the On Oq, the Nǔshībì (弩失畢: *Nu Šad(a)pit), and together they were registered in Chinese sources as the "ten names" (shí míng:十名) (Golden 2010, pp. 54–55).) The Duōlù challenged the Avars in the Kuban River-Sea of Azov area while the Khazar Khaghanate consolidated further westwards, led apparently by an Ashina dynasty. With a resounding victory over the tribes in 657, engineered by General Su Dingfang, Chinese overlordship was imposed to their East after a final mop-up operation in 659, but the two confederations of Bulğars and Khazars fought for supremacy on the western steppeland, and with the ascendency of the latter, the former either succumbed to Khazar rule or, as under Asparukh of Bulgaria, Kubrat's son, shifted even further west across the Danube to lay the foundations of the First Bulgarian Empire in the Balkans (c. 679).

The Khazar Khaghanate thus took shape from the ruins of this nomadic empire, which broke up under pressure from the armies of the Tang dynasty to the east sometime between 630 and 650. After their conquest of the lower Volga region to the East and an area westwards between the Danube and the Dniepr, and their subjugation of the Onoghur-Bulghar union, sometime around 670, a properly constituted Khazar Khaghanate emerges, becoming the westernmost successor state of the formidable Göktürk Khaghanate after its disintegration. According to Omeljan Pritsak, the language of the Onoghur-Bulghar federation was to become the lingua franca of Khazaria as it developed into what Lev Gumilev called a "steppe Atlantis" (stepnaja Atlantida/ Степная Атлантида). Historians have often referred to this period of Khazar domination as the Pax Khazarica because the state became an international trading hub that permitted Western Eurasian merchants safe passage across it to conduct business without interference. The high status soon to be accorded this empire to the north is attested by the Fars-Nama (c. 1100), which relates that the Sasanian emperor, Khosrau I, placed three thrones by his own, one for the King of China, a second for the King of Byzantium, and a third for the King of the Khazars. Although anachronistic in retrodating the Khazars to this period, the legend, by placing the Khazar khagan on a throne of equal status to the rulers of the other two superpowers, attests to the reputation the Khazars had long enjoyed.

=== Khazar state: culture and institutions ===
==== Royal diarchy with sacral Qağanate ====
Khazaria developed a diarchy (dual leadership) typical among Turkic nomads, consisting of a khagan-bek and a khagan. The emergence of this system may be deeply entwined with the conversion to Judaism. According to Arabic sources, the khagan-bek was called an ʾīšā and the greater a khagan (Arabic: خاقان, romanised: ḫāqān); the former managed and commanded the military, while the greater king's role was primarily sacral, less concerned with daily affairs. (Note: Several scholars connect it to Judaisation, with Mikhail Artamonov linking its introduction to Obadiah's reforms and the imposition of full Rabbinic Judaism and Pritsak to the same period (799–833), arguing that the Beg, a majordomo from the Iranian *Barč/Warâ Bolčan clan, identified with Obadiah, compelled the Qağanal clan to convert, an event which putatively caused the Qabar revolt. Golden comments: "There is nothing but conjecture to connect it with the reforms of Obadiyah, the further evolution of Khazar Judaism or the Qabars ... The fact is we do not know when, precisely, the Khazar system of dual kingship emerged. It could not have come ex nihilo. It was not present in the early stages of Khazar history. Given the Old Türk traditions of the Khazar state ... and the overall institutional conservation of steppe society, one must exercise great caution here. Clear evidence for it is relatively late (the latter part of the ninth century perhaps and more probably the tenth century)- although it was probably present by the first third of the ninth century. Iranian influences via the Ors guard of the Qağans may have also been a factor" (Golden 2007b, pp. 155–156))

The greater king was recruited from the Khazar house of notables (ahl bayt maʿrūfīn) and, in an initiation ritual, was nearly strangled until he declared the number of years he wished to reign, on the expiration of which he would be ritually killed by the nobles. Similarly, Ahmad ibn Fadlan wrote that there was a maximum limit on the number of years of a king's reign. If a khagan had reigned for at least forty years, his courtiers and subjects felt his ability to reason would become impaired by old age. They would then execute him. (Note: Petrukhin notes that ibn Fadlan's description of a Kievan Rus' prince (malik) and his lieutenant (khalifa) mirrored the Khazarian diarchy, but the comparison was flawed, as there was no sacral kingship among the Rus' (Petrukhin 2007, pp. 256–257).) The deputy ruler would enter the presence of the reclusive greater king only with great ceremony, approaching him barefoot to prostrate himself in the dust and then light a piece of wood as a purifying fire, while waiting humbly and calmly to be summoned.

Particularly elaborate rituals accompanied a royal burial. At one period, travellers had to dismount, bow before the ruler's tomb, and then walk away on foot. Subsequently, the charismatic sovereign's burial place was hidden from view, with a palatial structure ("Paradise") constructed and then hidden under rerouted riverwater to avoid disturbance by evil spirits and later generations. Such a qoruq 'taboo' royal burial ground is typical of inner Asian peoples.

Both the ʾīšā and the ḫāqān converted to Rabbinic Judaism sometime in the 8th century, while the rest, according to the Persian traveller Ahmad ibn Rustah, probably continued to follow traditional religion. (Note: "the rest of the Khazars profess a religion similar to that of the Turks." (Golden 2007b, pp. 130–131))

==== Ruling elite ====
The ruling stratum, like that of the later Činggisids within the Golden Horde, was a relatively small group that differed ethnically and linguistically from its subject peoples, meaning the Alano-As and Oğuric Turkic tribes, who were numerically superior within Khazaria. The Khazar Qağans, while taking wives and concubines from the subject populations, were protected by a Khwarazmian guard corps, or comitatus 'warband' called the Arsiyah. (Note: This regiment was exempt from campaigning against fellow Muslims, evidence that non-Judaic beliefs were no obstacle to access to the highest levels of government. They had abandoned their homeland and sought service with the Khazars in exchange for the right to exercise their religious freedom, according to al-Masudi (Golden 2007b, p. 138).) (Note: Olsson writes that there is no evidence for this Islamic guard for the 9th century, but that its existence is attested for 913 (Olsson 2013, p. 507).) But unlike many other local polities, they hired mercenary soldiers (the junūd murtazīqa in al-Masudi).

At the peak of their empire, the Khazars ran a centralised fiscal administration, with a standing army of some 7–12,000 men, which could, at need, be multiplied two or three times that number by inducting reserves from noble retinues. (Note: Noonan gives the lower figure for the Muslim contingents, but adds that the army could draw on other mercenaries stationed in the capital, Rūs, Ṣaqāliba and pagans. Olsson's 10,000 refers to the spring-summer horsemen in the nomadic king's retinue (Noonan 2007, pp. 211, 217).) Other figures for the permanent standing army indicate that it numbered as many as one hundred thousand. They controlled and exacted tribute from 25 to 30 different nations and tribes inhabiting the vast territories between the Caucasus, the Aral Sea, the Ural Mountains, and the Ukrainian steppes. Khazar armies were led by the khagan-bek and commanded by subordinate officers known as tarkhans. When the bek sent out a body of troops, they would not retreat under any circumstances. If they were defeated, survivors were executed.

Settlements were governed by administrative officials known as tuduns. In some cases, such as the Byzantine settlements in southern Crimea, a tudun would be appointed for a town nominally within another polity's sphere of influence. Other officials in the Khazar government included dignitaries referred to by ibn Fadlan as jāwashīghar and kündür, but their responsibilities are unknown.

==== Demographics ====
It has been estimated that 25 to 28 distinct ethnic groups made up the population of the Khazar Qağanate, aside from the ethnic elite. The ruling elite seems to have been constituted out of nine tribes/clans, themselves ethnically heterogeneous, spread over perhaps nine provinces or principalities, each of which would have been allocated to a clan. In terms of caste or class, some evidence suggests that there was a distinction, whether racial or social is unclear, between "White Khazars" (ak-Khazars) and "Black Khazars" (qara-Khazars). The 10th-century Muslim geographer al-Iṣṭakhrī claimed that the White Khazars were strikingly handsome with reddish hair, white skin, and blue eyes, while the Black Khazars were swarthy, verging on deep black as if they were "some kind of Indian". Many Turkic nations had a similar (political, not racial) division between a "white" ruling warrior caste and a "black" class of commoners; the consensus among mainstream scholars is that Istakhri was confused by the names given to the two groups. However, Khazars are generally described by early Arab sources as having a white complexion, blue eyes, and reddish hair. The ethnonym in the Tang Chinese annals, Ashina, often accorded a key role in the Khazar leadership, may reflect an Eastern Iranian or Tokharian word (Khotanese Saka âşşeina-āššsena "blue"): Middle Persian axšaêna ("dark-coloured"): Tokharian A âśna ("blue", "dark"). The distinction appears to have survived the collapse of the Khazarian empire. Later Russian chronicles, commenting on the role of the Khazars in the magyarisation of Hungary, refer to them as "White Oghurs" and Magyars as "Black Oghurs". Studies of the physical remains, such as skulls at Sarkel, have revealed individuals belonging to the Slavic, other European, and a few Mongolian types.

==== Economy ====
The import and export of foreign wares, and the revenues derived from taxing their transit, was a hallmark of the Khazar economy, although it is said also to have produced isinglass. Distinctively among the nomadic steppe polities, the Khazar Qağanate developed a self-sufficient domestic Saltovo economy, a combination of traditional pastoralism – allowing sheep and cattle to be exported – extensive agriculture, abundant use of the Volga's rich fishing stocks, together with craft manufacture, with diversification in lucrative returns from taxing international trade given its pivotal control of major trade routes.

The Khazar slave trade constituted one of the two great furnishers of slaves to the Muslim market to slavery in the Abbasid Caliphate (the other being the Iranian Sâmânid amîrs), supplying it with captured Slavs and tribesmen from the Eurasian northlands. It profited from the latter which enabled it to maintain a standing army of Khwarezm Muslim troops. The capital Atil reflected the division: Kharazān on the western bank where the king and his Khazar elite, with a retinue of some 4,000 attendants, dwelt, and Itil proper to the East, inhabited by Jews, Christians, Muslims and slaves and by craftsmen and foreign merchants. (Note: A third division may have contained the dwellings of the tsarina. The dimensions of the western part were 3x3, as opposed to the eastern part's 8 x 8 farsakhs (Noonan 2007, pp. 208–209, 216–219).)

The Khazar Khaghanate played a key role in the trade between Europe and the Muslim world in the early Middle Ages. People taken captive during the Viking raids in Europe, such as Ireland, could be transported to Hedeby or Brännö in Scandinavia and from there via the Volga trade route to Russia, where slaves and furs were sold to Muslim merchants in exchange for Arab silver dirham and silk, which have been found in Birka, Wollin and Dublin; during the 8th- and 9th-century this trade route between Europe and the Abbasid Caliphate passed via the Khazar Kaghanate, until it was supplanted in the 10th-century by the route of Volga Bulgaria, Khwarazm, and the Samanid slave trade.

The ruling elite wintered in the city and spent from spring to late autumn in their fields. A large irrigated greenbelt, drawing on channels from the Volga river, lay outside the capital, where meadows and vineyards extended for some 20 farsakhs (c. 60 miles). While customs duties were imposed on traders, and tribute and tithes were exacted from 25 to 30 tribes, with a levy of one sable skin, squirrel pelt, sword, dirham per hearth or ploughshare, or hides, wax, honey and livestock, depending on the zone. Trade disputes were handled by a commercial tribunal in Atil consisting of seven judges, two for each of the monotheistic inhabitants (Jews, Muslims, Christians) and one for the pagans. (Note: Outside Muslim traders were under the jurisdiction of a special royal official (ghulām) (Noonan 2007, pp. 211–214).)

=== Khazars and Byzantium ===
Byzantine diplomatic policy towards the steppe peoples generally consisted of encouraging them to fight among themselves. The Pechenegs provided great assistance to the Byzantines in the 9th century in exchange for regular payments. Byzantium also sought alliances with the Göktürks against common enemies: in the early 7th century, one such alliance was brokered with the Western Tűrks against the Persian Sasanians in the Byzantine–Sasanian War of 602–628. The Byzantines called Khazaria Tourkía, and by the 9th century referred to the Khazars as "Turks". (Note: Theophanes the Confessor around 813 defined them as Eastern Turks. The designation is complex and Róna-Tas writes: "The Georgian Chronicle refers to the Khazars in 626–628 as the 'West Turks' who were then opposed to the East Turks of Central Asia. Shortly after 679 the Armenian Geography mentions the Turks together with the Khazars; this may be the first record of the Magyars. Around 813, Theophanes uses – alongside the generic name Turk – 'East Turk' for the designation of the Khazars, and in context, the 'West Turks' may actually have meant the Magyars. We know that Nicholas Misticus referred to the Magyars as 'West Turks' in 924/925. In the 9th century the name Turk was mainly used to designate the Khazars." (Róna-Tas 1999, p. 282)) During the period leading up to and after the siege of Constantinople in 626, Heraclius sought help via emissaries, and eventually personally, from a Göktürk chieftain (Note: Many sources identify the Göktürks in this alliance as Khazars--for example, Beckwith writes recently: "The alliance sealed by Heraclius with the Khazars in 627 was of seminal importance to the Byzantine Empire through the Early Middle Ages, and helped assure its long-term survival." Early sources such as the almost contemporary Armenian history, Patmutʿiwn Ałuanicʿ Ašxarhi, attributed to Movsēs Dasxurancʿ, and the Chronicle attributed to Theophanes identify these Turks as Khazars (Theophanes has: "Turks, who are called Khazars"). Both Zuckerman and Golden reject the identification.) of the Western Turkic Khaganate, Tong Yabghu Qağan, in Tiflis, plying him with gifts and the promise of marriage to his daughter, Epiphania. Tong Yabghu responded by sending a large force to ravage the Persian empire, marking the start of the Third Perso-Turkic War. A joint Byzantine-Tűrk operation breached the Caspian gates and sacked Derbent in 627. Together they then besieged Tiflis, where the Byzantines may have deployed an early variety of traction trebuchets (ἑλέπόλεις) to breach the walls. After the campaign, Tong Yabghu is reported, perhaps with some exaggeration, to have left some 40,000 troops behind with Heraclius. Although occasionally identified with Khazars, the Göktürk identification is more probable since the Khazars only emerged from that group after the fragmentation of the former sometime after 630. Some scholars argued that Sasanian Persia never recovered from the devastating defeat wrought by this invasion. (Note: Scholars dismiss Chinese annals which, reporting the events from Turkic sources, attribute the destruction of Persia and its leader Shah Khusrau II personally to Tong Yabghu. Zuckerman argues instead that the account is correct in its essentials (Zuckerman 2007, p. 417).)

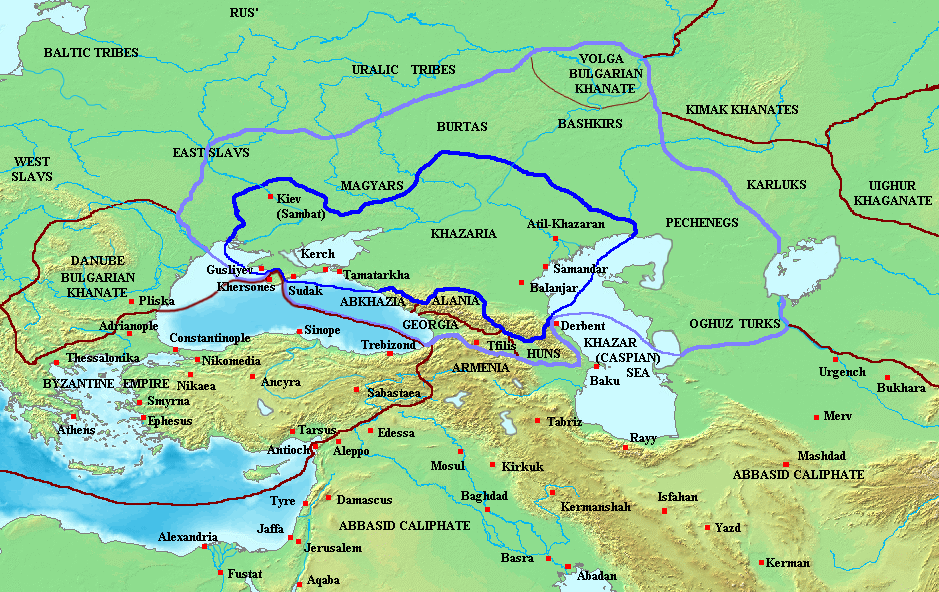
Khazar Khaganate and surrounding states, c. 820 (area of direct Khazar control in dark blue, sphere of influence in purple).

Once the Khazars emerged as a power, the Byzantines also began to form alliances with them, dynastic and military. In 695, the last Heraclian emperor, Justinian II, nicknamed "the slit-nosed" (ὁ ῥινότμητος) after he was mutilated and deposed, was exiled to Cherson in the Crimea, where a Khazar governor (tudun) presided. He escaped into Khazar territory in 704 or 705 and was given asylum by khagan Busir Glavan (Ἰβουζῆρος Γλιαβάνος), who gave him his sister in marriage, perhaps in response to an offer by Justinian, who may have thought a dynastic marriage would seal by kinship a powerful tribal support for his attempts to regain the throne. The Khazarian spouse thereupon changed her name to Theodora. Busir was offered a bribe by the Byzantine usurper, Tiberius III, to kill Justinian. Warned by Theodora, Justinian escaped, murdering two Khazar officials in the process. He fled to Bulgaria, whose Khan Tervel helped him regain the throne. Upon his reinstalment, and despite Busir's treachery during his exile, he sent for Theodora; Busir complied, and she was crowned as Augusta, suggesting that both prized the alliance.

Decades later, Leo III (ruled 717–741) made a similar alliance to co-ordinate strategy against a common enemy, the Muslim Arabs. He sent an embassy to the Khazar khagan Bihar and married his son, the future Constantine V (ruled 741–775), to Bihar's daughter, a princess referred to as Tzitzak, in 732. On converting to Christianity, she took the name Irene. Constantine and Irene had a son, the future Leo IV (775–780), who thereafter bore the sobriquet, "the Khazar". Leo died in mysterious circumstances after his Athenian wife bore him a son, Constantine VI, who on his majority co-ruled with his mother, the dowager. He proved unpopular, and his death ended the dynastic link of the Khazars to the Byzantine throne. By the 8th century, Khazars dominated the Crimea (650–c. 950), and even extended their influence into the Byzantine peninsula of Cherson until it was wrested back in the 10th century. Khazar and Farghânian (Φάργανοι) mercenaries constituted part of the imperial Byzantine Hetaireia bodyguard after its formation in 840, a position that could openly be purchased by a payment of seven pounds of gold.

=== Arab–Khazar wars ===
During the 7th and 8th centuries, the Khazars fought a series of wars against the Umayyad Caliphate and its Abbasid successor. The First Arab-Khazar War began during the first phase of Muslim expansion. By 640, Muslim forces had reached Armenia; in 642 they launched their first raid across the Caucasus under Abd ar-Rahman ibn Rabiah. In 652 Arab forces advanced on the Khazar capital, Balanjar, but were defeated, suffering heavy losses; according to Persian historians such as al-Tabari, both sides in the battle used catapults against the opposing troops. A number of Russian sources give the name of a Khazar khagan from this period as Irbis and describe him as a scion of the Göktürk royal house, the Ashina. Whether Irbis ever existed is open to debate, as is whether he can be identified with one of the many Göktürk rulers of the same name.

Due to the outbreak of the First Muslim Civil War and other priorities, the Arabs refrained from repeating an attack on the Khazars until the early 8th century. The Khazars launched a few raids into Transcaucasian principalities under Muslim dominion, including a large-scale raid in 683–685 during the Second Muslim Civil War that rendered much booty and many prisoners. There is evidence from the account of al-Tabari that the Khazars formed a united front with the remnants of the Göktürks in Transoxiana.

Caucasus region, c. 740

The Second Arab-Khazar War began with a series of raids across the Caucasus in the early 8th century. The Umayyads tightened their grip on Armenia in 705 after suppressing a large-scale rebellion. In 713 or 714, the Umayyad general Maslamah conquered Derbent and drove deeper into Khazar territory. The Khazars launched raids in response into Caucasian Albania and Iranian Azerbaijan but were driven back by the Arabs under Hasan ibn al-Nu'man. The conflict escalated in 722 with an invasion by 30,000 Khazars into Armenia inflicting a crushing defeat on the Arabs. Caliph Yazid II responded, sending 25,000 Arab troops north, swiftly driving the Khazars back across the Caucasus, recovering Derbent, and advancing on Balanjar. The Arabs broke through the Khazar defence and stormed the city; most of its inhabitants were killed or enslaved, but a few of them managed to flee north. Despite their success, the Arabs had not yet defeated the Khazar army, and they retreated south of the Caucasus.

In 724, the Arab general al-Jarrah ibn Abdallah al-Hakami inflicted a crushing defeat on the Khazars in a long battle between the rivers Cyrus and Araxes, then moved on to capture Tiflis, bringing Caucasian Iberia under Muslim suzerainty. The Khazars struck back in 726, led by a prince named Barjik, launching a major invasion of Albania and Azerbaijan; by 729, the Arabs had lost control of northeastern Transcaucasia and were thrust again into the defensive. In 730, Barjik invaded Iranian Azerbaijan and defeated Arab forces at Ardabil, killing the general al-Djarrah al-Hakami and briefly occupying the town. Barjik was defeated and killed the next year at Mosul, where he directed Khazar forces from a throne mounted with al-Djarrah's severed head. In 737, Marwan Ibn Muhammad entered Khazar territory under the guise of seeking a truce. He then launched a surprise attack in which The Qaghan fled north and the Khazars surrendered. The Arabs did not have enough resources to influence the affairs of Transcaucasia. The Qağan was forced to accept terms involving his conversion to Islam, and subject himself to the rule of the Caliphate, but the accommodation was short-lived because a combination of internal instability among the Umayyads and Byzantine support undid the agreement within three years, and the Khazars re-asserted their independence. The suggestion that the Khazars adopted Judaism as early as 740 is based on the idea that, in part, it was, a re-assertion of their independence from the rule of both regional powers, Byzantium and the Caliphate, while it also conformed to a general Eurasian trend to embrace a world religion. (Note: "The Khazars, the close allies of the Byzantines, adopted Judaism, as their official religion, apparently by 740, three years after an invasion by the Arabs under Marwan ibn Muhammad. Marwan had used treachery against a Khazar envoy in order to gain peaceful entrance into Khazar territory. He then declared his dishonourable intentions and pressed deep into Khazar territory, subsequently, he released the envoy. The Arabs devastated the horse herds, seized many Khazars and others as captives, and forced much of the population to flee into the Ural Mountains. Marwan's terms dictated that the kaghan and his Khazars should convert to Islam. Having no choice, the kaghan accepted Marwan's terms, and the Arabs returned home in triumph. As soon as the Arabs were gone, the kaghan renounced Islam – with, one may assume, great vehemence. The Khazar Dynasty's conversion to Judaism is best explained by this specific historical background, together with the fact that the mid-eighth century was an age in which the major Eurasian states proclaimed their adherence to distinctive world religions. Adopting Judaism also was politically astute: it meant that the Khazars did not have to accept the overlordship (however theoretical) of the Arab caliph or the Byzantine emperor." (Beckwith 2011, p. 149))

Whatever the impact of Marwan's campaigns was, warfare between the Khazars and the Arabs ceased for more than two decades after 737. Arab raids continued to occur until 741, but their control of the region was limited because maintaining a large garrison at Derbent further depleted their already overstretched army. A third Muslim civil war soon broke out, leading to the Abbasid Revolution and the fall of the Umayyad dynasty in 750.

In 758, the Abbasid Caliph al-Mansur attempted to strengthen diplomatic ties with the Khazars, ordering Yazid ibn Usayd al-Sulami, one of his nobles and the military governor of Armenia, to take a royal Khazar bride. Yazid married a daughter of Khazar Khagan Baghatur, but she died inexplicably, possibly during childbirth. Her attendants returned home, convinced that some members of another Arab faction had poisoned her, and her father was enraged. The Khazar general Ras Tarkhan invaded regions which were located south of the Caucasus in 762–764, devastating Albania, Armenia, and Iberia, and capturing Tiflis. Thereafter, relations between the Khazars and the Abbasids became increasingly cordial, because the foreign policies of the Abbasids were generally less expansionist than the foreign policies of the Umayyads, relations between the Khazars and the Abbasids were ultimately broken by a series of raids which occurred in 799, the raids occurred after another marriage alliance failed.

After the Khazars assumed control of Transcaucasia, at some time they set up towns including Samiran, Samsakly, Sambalut, Samakha, and Samkalak - with the common fragment "Sam" meaning "top" or "high" or "main".

=== Khazars and Hungarians ===
Around 830, a rebellion broke out in the Khazar khaganate. As a result, three Kabar tribes of the Khazars (probably the majority of ethnic Khazars) joined the Hungarians and moved through Levedia to what the Hungarians call the Etelköz, the territory between the Carpathians and the Dnieper River. The Hungarians faced their first attack by the Pechenegs around 854, though other sources state that an attack by Pechenegs was the reason for their departure to Etelköz. The new neighbours of the Hungarians were the Varangians and the eastern Slavs. From 862 onwards, the Hungarians (already referred to as the Ungri) along with their allies, the Kabars, started a series of raids from the Etelköz into the Carpathian Basin, mostly against the Eastern Frankish Empire (Germany) and Great Moravia, but also against the Lower Pannonian principality and Bulgaria. Then they together ended up at the outer slopes of Carpathians, and settled there.

=== Rise of the Rus' and the collapse of the Khazarian state ===
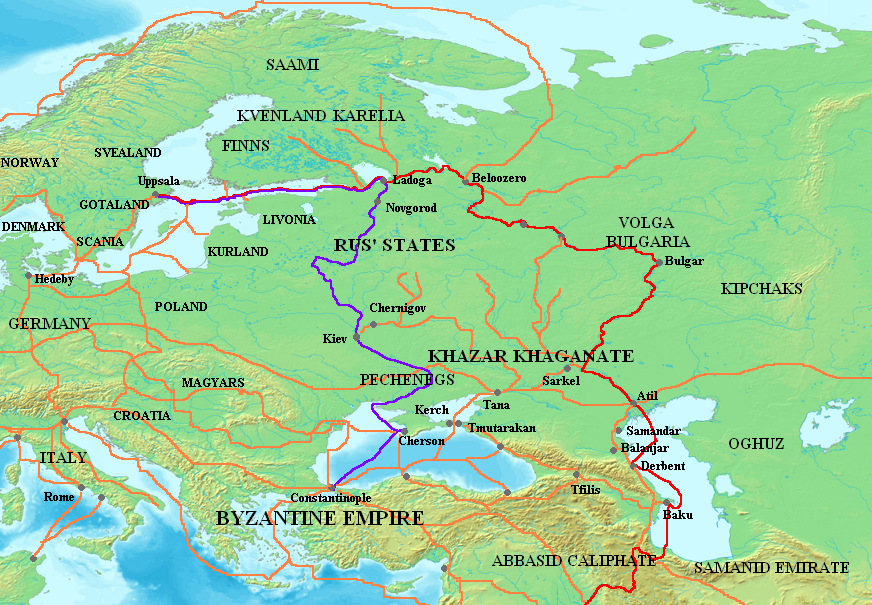
Trade routes of the Black Sea region, 8th–11th centuries

By the 9th century, groups of Varangian Rus', developing a powerful warrior-merchant system, began probing south down the waterways controlled by the Khazars and their protectorate, the Volga Bulgarians, partially in pursuit of the Arab silver that flowed north for hoarding through the Khazarian-Volga Bulgarian trading zones, (Note: Over 520 separate hoards of such silver have been uncovered in Sweden and Gotland (Moss 2002, p. 16).) partially to trade in furs and ironwork. (Note: The Volga Bulgarian state was converted to Islam in the 10th century, and wrested liberty from its Khazarian suzerains when Svyatislav razed Atil (Abulafia 1987, pp. 419, 480–483).) Northern mercantile fleets passing Atil were tithed, as they were at Byzantine Cherson. Their presence may have prompted the formation of a Rus' state by convincing the Slavs, Merja and the Chud' to unite to protect common interests against Khazarian exactions of tribute. It is often argued that a Rus' Khaganate modelled on the Khazarian state had formed to the east and that the Varangian chieftain of the coalition appropriated the title of khagan as early as the 830s: the title survived to denote the princes of Kievan Rus', whose capital, Kiev, is often associated with a Khazarian foundation. (Note: Whittow argues however that: "The title of qaghan, with its claims to lordship over the steppe world, is likely to be no more than ideological booty from the 965 victory." (Whittow 1996, pp. 243–252)) (Note: Korobkin citing Golb & Pritsak notes that Khazars have often been connected with Kiev's foundations. Pritsak and Golb state that children in Kiev were being given a mixture of Hebrew and Slavic names by c. 930. Toch on the other hand is sceptical, and argues that "a significant Jewish presence in early medieval Kiev or indeed in Russia at large remains much in doubt".) The construction of the Sarkel fortress, with technical assistance from Khazaria's Byzantine ally at the time, together with the minting of an autonomous Khazar coinage around the 830s, may have been a defensive measure against emerging threats from Varangians to the north and from the Magyars on the eastern steppe. (Note: The yarmaq based on the Arab dirhem was perhaps issued in reaction to fall-off in Muslim minting in the 820s, and to a felt need in the turbulent upheavals of the 830s to assert a new religious profile, with the Jewish legends stamped on them (Golden 2007b, p. 156).) (Note: Scholars are divided as to whether the fortification of Sarkel represents a defensive bulwark against a growing Magyar or Varangian threat (Petrukhin 2007, pp. 247, and n.1).) By 860, the Rus' had penetrated as far as Kiev and, via the Dnieper, Constantinople.

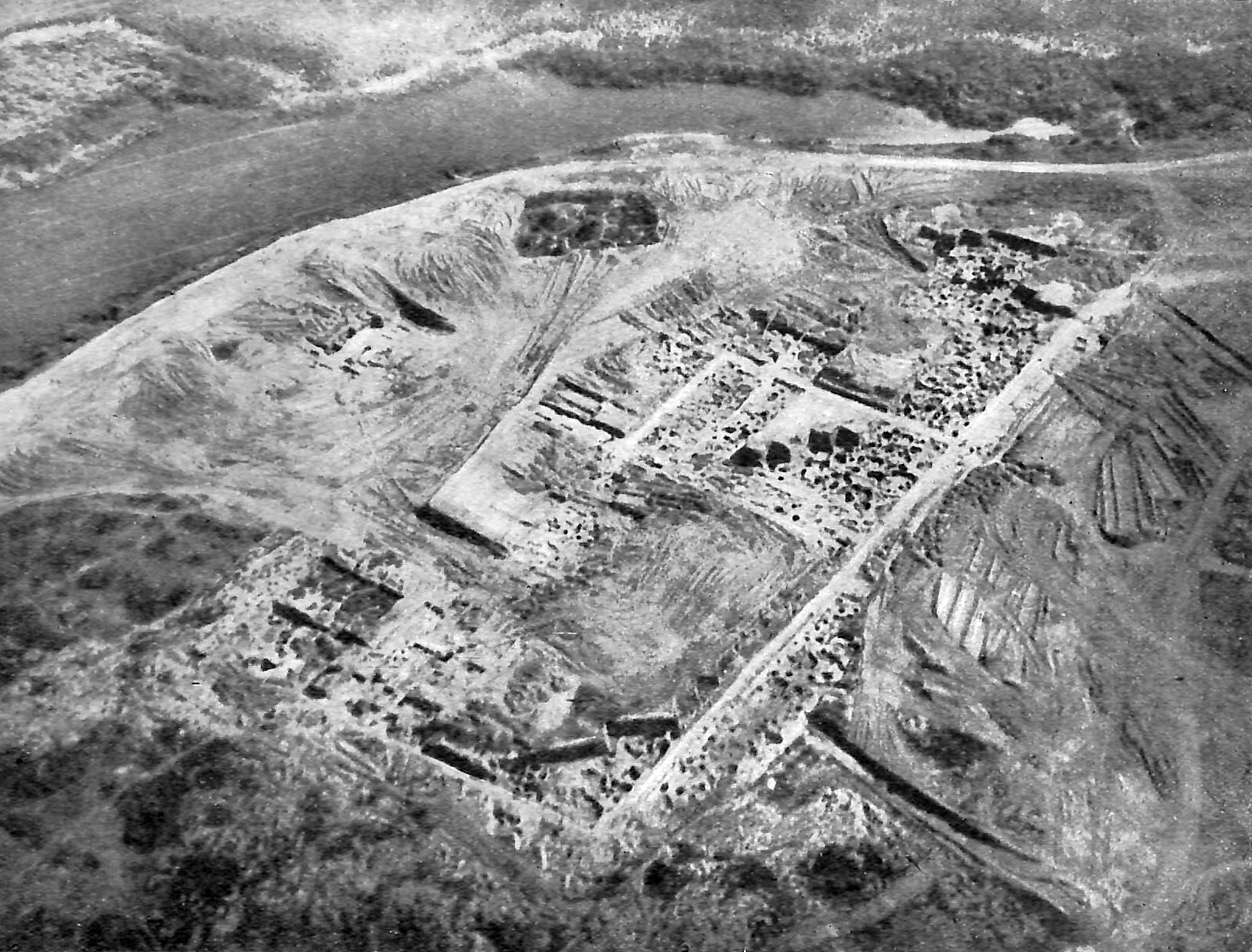
Site of the Khazar fortress at Sarkel (aerial photo from excavations conducted by Mikhail Artamonov in the 1950s).

Alliances often shifted. Byzantium, threatened by Varangian Rus' raiders, would assist Khazaria, and Khazaria at times allowed the northerners to pass through their territory in exchange for a portion of the booty. From the beginning of the 10th century, the Khazars found themselves fighting on multiple fronts as nomadic incursions were exacerbated by uprisings by former clients and invasions from former allies. The pax Khazarica was caught in a pincer movement between steppe Pechenegs and the strengthening of an emergent Rus' power to the north, both undermining Khazaria's tributary empire. According to the Schechter Text, the Khazar ruler King Benjamin (ca.880–890) fought a battle against the allied forces of five lands whose moves were perhaps encouraged by Byzantium. (Note: MQDWN or the Macedon dynasty of Byzantium; SY, perhaps a central Volga statelet, Burtas, Asya; PYYNYL denoting the Danube-Don Pechnegs; BM, perhaps indicating the Volga Bulgars, and TWRQY or Oghuz Turks. The provisory identifications are those of Pritsak (Kohen 2007, p. 106).) Although Benjamin was victorious, his son Aaron II faced another invasion, this time led by the Alans, whose leader had converted to Christianity and entered into an alliance with Byzantium, which, under Leo VI the Wise, encouraged them to fight against the Khazars.

By the 880s, Khazar control of the Middle Dnieper from Kiev, where they collected tribute from Eastern Slavic tribes, began to wane as Oleg of Novgorod wrested control of the city from the Varangian warlords Askold and Dir, and embarked on what was to prove to be the foundation of a Rus' empire. The Khazars had initially allowed the Rus' to use the trade route along the Volga River, and raid southwards. According to Al-Mas'udi, the khagan is said to have given his assent on the condition that the Rus' give him half of the booty. In 913, however, two years after Byzantium had concluded a peace treaty with the Rus', a Varangian foray, with Khazar connivance, through Arab lands led to a request to the Khazar throne by the Khwârazmian Islamic guard for permission to retaliate against the large Rus' contingent on its return. The purpose was to revenge the violence the Rus' razzias had inflicted on their fellow Muslim believers. (Note: Al-Mas'udi says the king secretly alerted the Rus' to the attack but was unable to oppose the request of his guards (Olsson 2013, p. 507).) The Rus' force was thoroughly routed and massacred. The Khazar rulers closed the passage down the Volga to the Rus', sparking a war. In the early 960s, Khazar ruler Joseph wrote to Hasdai ibn Shaprut about the deterioration of Khazar relations with the Rus': "I protect the mouth of the river (Itil-Volga) and prevent the Rus arriving in their ships from setting off by sea against the Ishmaelites and (equally) all (their) enemies from setting off by land to Bab." (Note: The letter continues: "I wage war with them. If I left them (in peace) for a single hour they would crush the whole land of the Ishmaelites up to Baghdad." (Petrukhin 2007, p. 257))

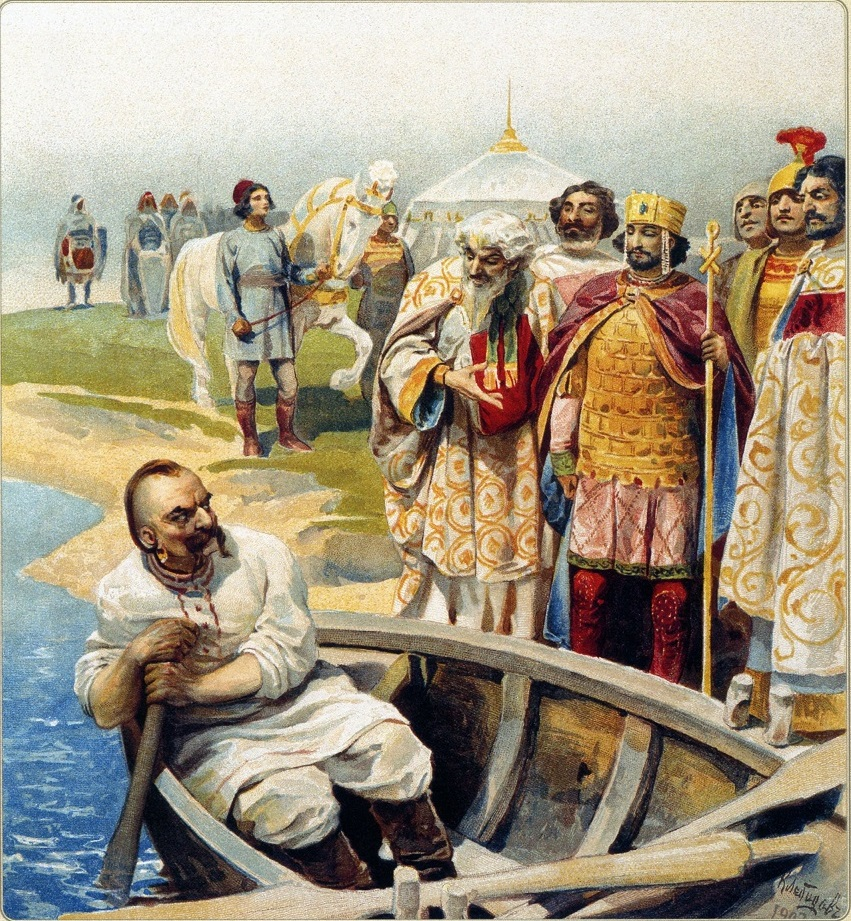
Sviatoslav I of Kiev (in boat), destroyer of the Khazar Khaganate. (Note: From Klavdiy Lebedev (1852–1916), Svyatoslav's meeting with Emperor John, as described by Leo the Deacon.)

The Rus' warlords launched several wars against the Khazar Qağanate, and raided down to the Caspian Sea. The Schechter Letter relates the story of a campaign against Khazaria by HLGW (recently identified as Oleg of Chernigov) around 941 in which Oleg was defeated by the Khazar general Pesakh. The Khazar alliance with the Byzantine empire began to collapse in the early 10th century. Byzantine and Khazar forces may have clashed in the Crimea, and by the 940s emperor Constantine VII Porphyrogenitus was speculating in De Administrando Imperio about ways in which the Khazars could be isolated and attacked. The Byzantines during the same period began to attempt alliances with the Pechenegs and the Rus', with varying degrees of success. A further factor undermining the Khazar Qağanate was a shift in Islamic routes at this time, as Muslims in Khwarazmia forged trade links with the recently converted Volga Bulgarian Muslims, a move which may have caused a drastic drop, perhaps up to 80%, in the revenue base of Khazaria, and consequently, a crisis in its ability to pay for its defence.

Sviatoslav I finally succeeded in destroying Khazar imperial power in the 960s, in a circular sweep that overwhelmed Khazar fortresses like Sarkel and Tamatarkha, and reached as far as the Caucasian Kassogians/Circassians (Note: H. H. Howorth argued that the Khazars were the ancestors of contemporary Circassians (Howorth 1870, pp. 182–192).) and then back to Kiev. Sarkel fell in 965, with the capital city of Atil following, c. 968 or 969.

In the Russian chronicle, the vanquishing of the Khazar traditions is associated with Vladimir's conversion in 986. According to the Primary Chronicle, in 986, Khazar Jews were present at Vladimir's disputation to decide on the prospective religion of the Kievan Rus'. Whether these were Jews who had settled in Kiev or emissaries from some Jewish Khazar remnant state is unclear. Conversion to one of the faiths of the people of Scripture was a precondition to any peace treaty with the Arabs, whose Bulgar envoys had arrived in Kiev after 985.

A visitor to Atil wrote soon after the sacking of the city that its vineyards and garden had been razed, that not a grape or raisin remained in the land, and not even alms for the poor were available. An attempt to rebuild may have been undertaken, since Ibn Hawqal and al-Muqaddasi refer to it after that date, but by Al-Biruni's time (1048) it was in ruins. (Note: Dunlop thought the later city of Saqsin lay on or near Atil (Dunlop 1954, p. 248).)

=== Aftermath: impact, decline and dispersion ===
Although Poliak argued that the Khazar kingdom did not wholly succumb to Sviatoslav's campaign, but lingered on until 1224, when the Mongols invaded Rus', by most accounts, the Rus'-Oghuz campaigns left Khazaria devastated, with perhaps many Khazarian Jews in flight, and leaving behind at best a minor rump state. It left little trace, except for some placenames, (Note: The Caspian Sea is still known to Arabs, and many peoples of the region, as the "Khazar Sea" (Arabic Bahr ul-Khazar) (Brook 2010, p. 156)) and much of its population was undoubtedly absorbed in successor hordes. Al-Muqaddasi, writing ca.985, mentions Khazar beyond the Caspian sea as a district of "woe and squalor", with honey, many sheep and Jews. Kedrenos mentions a joint Rus'-Byzantine attack on Khazaria in 1016, which defeated its ruler Georgius Tzul. The name suggests Christian affiliations. The account concludes by saying, that after Tzul's defeat, the Khazar ruler of "upper Media", Senaccherib, had to sue for peace and submission. In 1024 Mstislav of Chernigov (one of Vladimir's sons) marched against his brother Yaroslav with an army that included "Khazars and Kassogians" in a repulsed attempt to restore a kind of "Khazarian"-type dominion over Kiev. Ibn al-Athir's mention of a "raid of Faḍlūn the Kurd against the Khazars" in 1030 CE, in which 10,000 of his men were vanquished by the latter, has been taken as a reference to such a Khazar remnant, but Barthold identified this Faḍlūn as Faḍl ibn Muḥammad and the "Khazars" as either Georgians or Abkhazians. A Kievian prince named Oleg, grandson of Jaroslav was reportedly kidnapped by "Khazars" in 1079 and shipped off to Constantinople, although most scholars believe that this is a reference to the Cumans-Kipchaks or other steppe peoples then dominant in the Pontic region. Upon his conquest of Tmutarakan in the 1080s Oleg gave himself the title "archon of Khazaria". In 1083 Oleg is said to have exacted revenge on the Khazars after his brother Roman was killed by their allies, the Polovtsi. After one more conflict with these Polovtsi in 1106, the Khazars fade from history. By the 13th century they survived in Russian folklore only as "Jewish heroes" in the "land of the Jews". (zemlya Jidovskaya).

By the end of the 12th century, Petachiah of Ratisbon reported travelling through what he called "Khazaria", and had little to remark on other than describing its minim (sectaries) living amidst desolation in perpetual mourning. The reference seems to be to Karaites. The Franciscan missionary William of Rubruck likewise found only impoverished pastures in the lower Volga area where Ital once lay. Giovanni da Pian del Carpine, the papal legate to the court of the Mongol Khan Guyuk at that time, mentioned an otherwise unattested Jewish tribe, the Brutakhi, perhaps in the Volga region. Although connections are made to the Khazars, the link is based merely on a common attribution of Judaism.

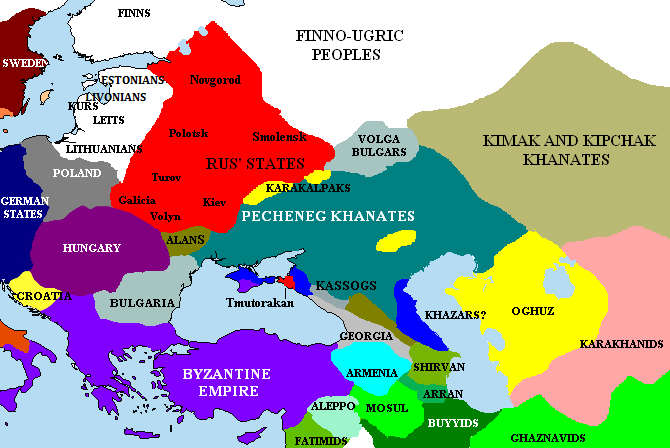
The Pontic steppes, c. 1015 (areas in blue possibly still under Khazar control).

The 10th century Zoroastrian Dênkart registered the collapse of Khazar power in attributing its eclipse to the enfeebling effects of "false" religion. (Note: "thus it is clear that the false doctrine of Yišô in Rome (Hrôm) and that of Môsê among the Khazars and that of Mânî in Turkistan took away their might and the valor that they once possessed and made them feeble and decadent among their rivals" (Golden 2007b, p. 130).) The decline was contemporary to that suffered by the Transoxiana Sāmānid empire to the east, both events paving the way for the rise of the Great Seljuq Empire, whose founding traditions mention Khazar connections. (Note: Some sources claim that the father of Seljuk, the eponymous progenitor of the Seljuk Turks, namely Toqaq Temür Yalığ, began his career as an Oghuz soldier in Khazar service in the early and mid-10th century, and rose to high rank before he fell out with the Khazar rulers and departed for Khwarazm. Seljuk's sons, significantly, all bear names from the Jewish scriptures: Mîkâ"il, Isrâ"îl, Mûsâ, Yûnus. Peacock argues that early traditions attesting a Seljuk origin within the Khazar empire when it was powerful, were later rewritten, after Khazaria fell from power in the 11th century, to blank out the connection (Peacock 2010, pp. 27–35).) Whatever successor entity survived, it could no longer function as a bulwark against the pressure east and south of nomad expansions. By 1043, Kimeks and Qipchaqs, thrusting westwards, pressured the Oğuz, who in turn pushed the Pechenegs west towards Byzantium's Balkan provinces.

Khazaria nonetheless left its mark on the rising states and some of their traditions and institutions. Much earlier, Tzitzak, the Khazar wife of Leo III, introduced into the Byzantine court the distinctive kaftan or riding habit of the nomadic Khazars, the tzitzakion (τζιτζάκιον), and this was adopted as a solemn element of imperial dress. (Note: Tzitzak is often treated as her original proper name, with a Turkic etymology čiček ("flower"). Erdal, however, citing the Byzantine work on court ceremony De Ceremoniis, authored by Constantine Porphyrogennetos, argues that the word referred only to the dress Irene wore at court, perhaps denoting its colourfulness, and compares it to the Hebrew ciciot, the knotted fringes of a ceremonial shawl, or tallit (Erdal 2007, p. 80, n.22; Wexler 1987, p. 72).) The orderly hierarchical system of succession by "scales" (lestvichnaia sistema:лествичная система) to the Grand Principate of Kiev was arguably modelled on Khazar institutions, via the example of the Rus' Khaganate.

The proto-Hungarian Pontic tribe, while perhaps threatening Khazaria as early as 839 (Sarkel), practiced their institutional model, such as the dual rule of a ceremonial kende-kündü and a gyula administering practical and military administration, as tributaries of the Khazars. A dissident group of Khazars, the Qabars, joined the Hungarians in their migration westwards as they moved into Pannonia. Elements within the Hungarian population can be viewed as perpetuating Khazar traditions as a successor state. Byzantine sources refer to Hungary as Western Tourkia in contrast to Khazaria, Eastern Tourkia. The gyula line produced the kings of medieval Hungary through descent from Árpád, while the Qabars retained their traditions longer, and were known as "black Hungarians" (fekete magyarság). Some archaeological evidence from Čelarevo suggests the Qabars practised Judaism since warrior graves with Jewish symbols were found there, including menorahs, shofars, etrogs, lulavs, candlesnuffers, ash collectors, inscriptions in Hebrew, and a six-pointed star identical to the Star of David.

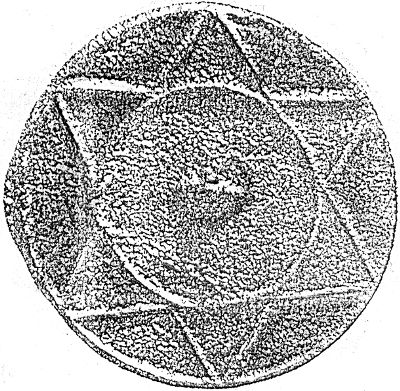
Seal discovered in excavations at Khazar sites. However, rather than having been made by Jews, these appear to be shamanistic sun discs. (Note: "Engravings that resemble the six-pointed Star of David were found on circular Khazar relics and bronze mirrors from Sarkel and Khazarian grave fields in Upper Saltov. However, rather than having been made by Jews, these appear to be shamanistic sun discs." (Brook 2010, pp. 113, 122–123 n.148))

The Khazar state was not the only Jewish state to rise between the fall of the Second Temple (67–70 CE) and the establishment of Israel (1948). A state in Yemen also adopted Judaism in the 4th century, lasting until the rise of Islam.

The Khazar kingdom is said to have stimulated messianic aspirations for a return to Israel as early as Judah Halevi. In the time of the Egyptian vizier Al-Afdal Shahanshah (d. 1121), one Solomon ben Duji, often identified as a Khazarian Jew, (Note: Brook says this thesis was developed by Jacob Mann, based on a reading of the word "Khazaria" in the Cairo Geniza fragment. Bernard Lewis, he adds, challenged the assumption by noting that the original text reads Hakkâri and refers to the Kurds of the Hakkâri mountains in south-east Turkey (Brook 2010, pp. 191–192, n.72).) attempted to advocate for a messianic effort for the liberation of, and return of all Jews to, Palestine. He wrote to many Jewish communities to enlist support. He eventually moved to Kurdistan where his son Menachem some decades later assumed the title of Messiah and, raising an army for this purpose, took the fortress of Amadiya north of Mosul. His project was opposed by the rabbinical authorities and he was poisoned in his sleep. One theory maintains that the Star of David, until then a decorative motif or magical emblem, began to assume its national value in late Jewish tradition from its earlier symbolic use by Menachem.

The word Khazar, as an ethnonym, was last used in the 13th century by people in the North Caucasus believed to practice Judaism. The nature of a hypothetical Khazar diaspora, Jewish or otherwise, is disputed. Avraham ibn Daud mentions encountering rabbinical students descended from Khazars as far away as Toledo, Spain in the 1160s. Khazar communities persisted here and there. Many Khazar mercenaries served in the armies of the Islamic Caliphates and other states. Documents from medieval Constantinople attest to a Khazar community mingled with the Jews of the suburb of Pera. Khazar merchants were active in both Constantinople and Alexandria in the 12th century.

== Religion ==
=== Tengrism ===
Direct sources for the Khazar religion are not many, but in all likelihood they originally engaged in a traditional Turkic form of religious practices known as Tengrism, which focused on the sky god Tengri. Something of its nature may be deduced from what we know of the rites and beliefs of contiguous tribes, such as the North Caucasian Huns. Horse sacrifices were made to this supreme deity. Rites involved offerings to fire, water, and the moon, to remarkable creatures, and to "gods of the road" (cf. Old Türk yol tengri, perhaps a god of fortune). Sun amulets were widespread as cultic ornaments. A tree cult was also maintained. Whatever was struck by lightning, man or object, was considered a sacrifice to the high god of heaven. The afterlife, to judge from excavations of aristocratic tumuli, was much a continuation of life on earth, warriors being interred with their weapons, horses, and sometimes with human sacrifices: the funeral of one tudrun in 711-12 saw 300 soldiers killed to accompany him to the otherworld. Ancestor worship was observed. The key religious figure appears to have been a shaman-like qam, and it was these (qozmím) that were, according to the Khazar Hebrew conversion stories, driven out.

Many sources suggest, and a notable number of scholars have argued, that the charismatic Ashina clan played a germinal role in the early Khazar state, although Zuckerman dismisses the widespread notion of their pivotal role as a "phantom". The Ashina were closely associated with the Tengri cult, whose practices involved rites performed to assure a tribe of heaven's protective providence. The khagan was deemed to rule by virtue of qut, "the heavenly mandate/good fortune to rule." (Note: Whittow notes that this native institution, given the constant, lengthy, military and acculturating pressures on the tribes from China to the East, was influenced also by the sinocentric doctrine of the Mandate of Heaven (Tiānmìng:天命), which signalled legitimacy of rule (Whittow 1996, p. 220).)

=== Christianity ===
Khazaria long served as a buffer state between the Byzantine Empire and both the nomads of the northern steppes and the Umayyad Empire, after serving as Byzantium's proxy against the Sasanian Persian Empire. The alliance was dropped around 900. Byzantium began to encourage the Alans to attack Khazaria and weaken its hold on Crimea and the Caucasus, while seeking to obtain an entente with the rising Rus' power to the north, which it aspired to convert to Christianity.

On Khazaria's southern flank, both Islam and Byzantine Christianity were proselytising great powers. Byzantine success in the north was sporadic, although Armenian and Albanian missions from Derbend built churches extensively in maritime Daghestan, then a Khazar district. Buddhism also had exercised an attraction on leaders of both the Eastern (552–742) and Western Qağanates (552–659), the latter being the progenitor of the Khazar state. In 682, according to the Armenian chronicle of Movsês Dasxuranc'i, the king of Caucasian Albania, Varaz Trdat, dispatched a bishop, Israyêl, to convert Caucasian "Huns" who were subject to the Khazars, and managed to convince Alp Ilut'uêr, a son-in-law of the Khazar khagan, and his army, to abandon their shamanising cults and join the Christian fold. (Note: Alp Ilut'uêr is a Turkish subordinate title (Golden 2007b, p. 124).)

The Arab Georgian martyr St Abo, who converted to Christianity within the Khazar kingdom around 779–80, describes local Khazars as irreligious. (Note: Golden and Shapira thinks the evidence from such Georgian sources renders suspect a conversion prior to this date (Golden 2007b, pp. 135–136; Shapira 2007b, pp. 347–348).) Some reports register a Christian majority at Samandar, (Note: Golden 2007b, pp. 135–136, reporting on al-Muqaddasi.) or Muslim majorities. (Note: During Islamic invasions, some groups of Khazars who suffered defeat, including a khagan, were converted to Islam (DeWeese 1994, p. 73).)

=== Judaism ===
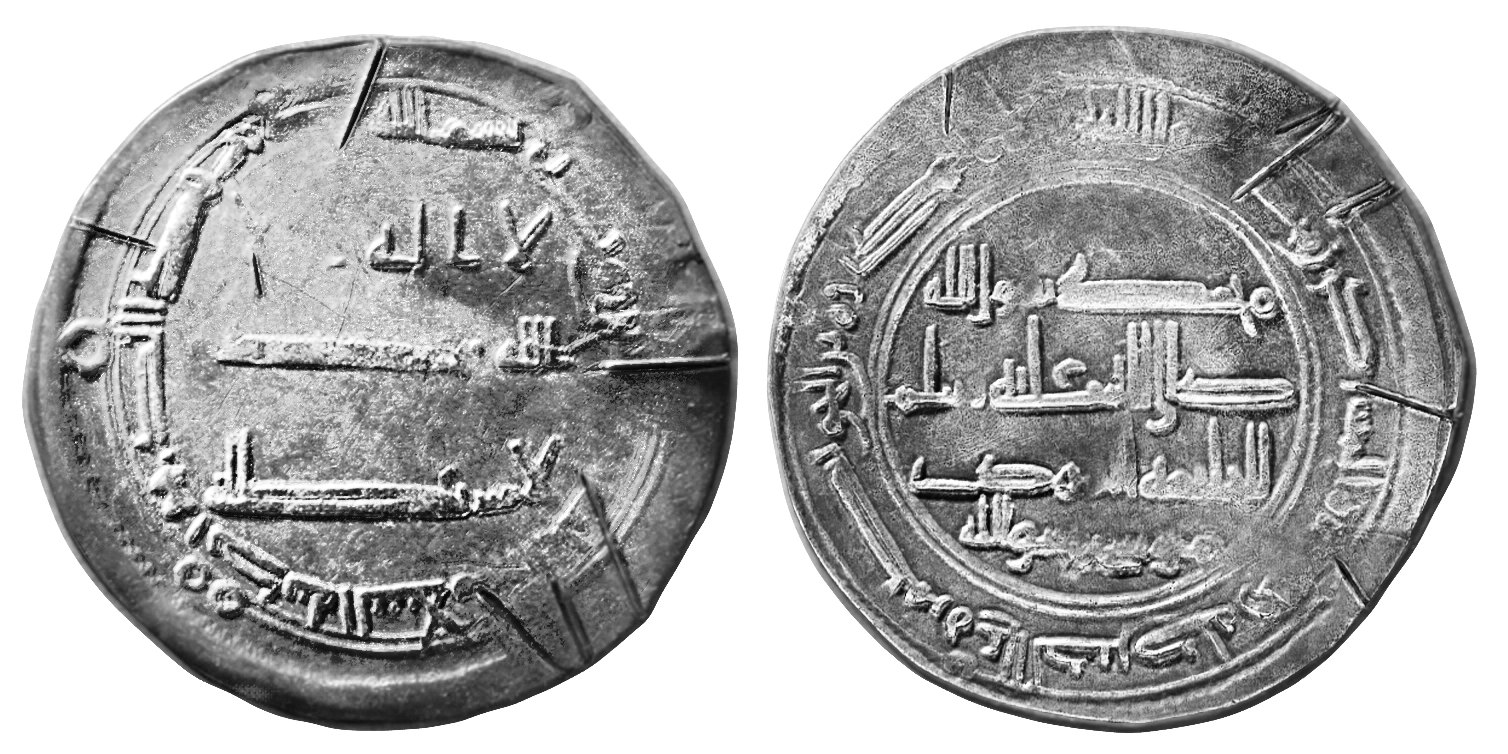
The Khazar "Moses coin" from the Spillings Hoard is an example of a dirham motif dated to c. 837/8 CE (223 AH) based on comparison with a different motif explicitly naming its origin in a Khazar workshop—as coins of this motif commonly imitate coins from different Abbasid mints down to the year. Its reverse replaces the standard Muslim legend "Muhammad is a messenger of God" with an expanded inscription: "Muhammad is a messenger of God, may God bless him and grant him peace; the Caliph al-Mahdi; Moses is a messenger of God."

Conversion to Judaism is mentioned in the Khazar Correspondence and medieval external sources, such as Masudi's "Meadows of Gold". The authenticity of the former was long doubted and challenged, (Note: Johannes Buxtorf first published the letters around 1660. Controversy arose over their authenticity; it was even argued that the letters represented "no more than Jewish self-consolation and fantasmagory over the lost dreams of statehood" (Kohen 2007, p. 112).) but the documents are now widely accepted by specialists as either authentic or as reflecting internal Khazar traditions. (Note: "If anyone thinks that the Khazar correspondence was first composed in 1577 and published in Qol Mebasser, the onus of proof is certainly on him. He must show that a number of ancient manuscripts, which appear to contain references to the correspondence, have all been interpolated since the end of the sixteenth century. This will prove a very difficult or rather an impossible task." (Dunlop 1954, p. 130)) (Note: "The issue of the authenticity of the Correspondence has a long and mottled history which need not detain us here. Dunlop and most recently Golb have demonstrated that Hasdai's letter, Joseph's response (dating perhaps from the 950s) and the 'Cambridge Document' are, indeed, authentic." (Golden 2007b, pp. 145–146)) (Note: "(a court debate on conversion) appears in accounts of Khazar Judaism in two Hebrew accounts, as well as in one eleventh-century Arabic account. These widespread and evidently independent attestations would seem to support the historicity of some kind of court debate, but, more important, clearly suggest the currency of tales recounting the conversion and originating among the Khazar Jewish community itself" ... "the 'authenticity' of the Khazar correspondence is hardly relevant" "The wider issue of the 'authenticity' of the 'Khazar correspondence', and of the significance of this tale's parallels with the equally controversial Cambridge document /Schechter text, has been discussed extensively in the literature on Khazar Judaism; much of the debate loses significance if, as Pritsak has recently suggested, the accounts are approached as 'epic' narratives rather than evaluated from the standpoint of their 'historicity'.") Archaeological evidence for conversion, on the other hand, remains elusive, (Note: "Of the intensive archaeological study of Khazar sites (over a thousand burial sites have been investigated!), not one has yet yielded finds that yet fit in some way the material legacy of antique European or Middle Eastern Jewry." (Toch 2012, pp. 162–163)) (Note: Shingiray noting the widespread lack of artifacts of wealth in Khazar burials, arguing that nomads used few materials to express their personal attributes: "The SMC assemblages-even if they were not entirely missing from the Khazar imperial center - presented an outstanding instance of archaeological material minimalism in this region." (Shingiray 2012, pp. 209–211)) and may reflect either the incompleteness of excavations, or that the stratum of actual adherents was thin. (Note: "But, one must ask, are we to expect much religious paraphernalia in a recently converted steppe society? Do the Oğuz, in the century or so after their Islamization, present much physical evidence in the steppe for their new faith? These conclusions must be considered preliminary." (Golden 2007b, pp. 150–151, and note 137)) Conversion of steppe or peripheral tribes to a universal religion is a fairly well attested phenomenon, (Note: Golden 2007b, pp. 128–129 compares Ulfilas's conversions of the Goths to Arianism; Al-Masudi records a conversion of the Alans to Christianity during the Abbasid period; the Volga Bulğars adopted Islam after their leader converted in the 10th century; the Uyğur Qağan accepted Manichaeism in 762.) and the Khazar conversion to Judaism, although unusual, would not have been without precedent. (Note: Golden takes exception to J. B. Bury's claim (1912) that it was "unique in history". Golden also cites from Jewish history the conversion of Idumeans under John Hyrcanus; of the Itureans under Aristobulus I; of the kingdom of Adiabene under Queen Helena; the Ḥimyârî kings in Yemen, and Berber assimilations into North African Jewry.)

Jews from both the Islamic world and Byzantium are known to have migrated to Khazaria during periods of persecution under Heraclius, Justinian II, Leo III, and Romanus Lakapēnos. For Simon Schama, Jewish communities from the Balkans and the Bosphoran Crimea, especially from Panticapaeum, began migrating to the more hospitable climate of pagan Khazaria in the wake of these persecutions, and were joined there by Jews from Armenia. The Geniza fragments, he argues, make it clear the Judaising reforms sent roots down into the whole of the population. The pattern is one of an elite conversion preceding large-scale adoption of the new religion by the general population, which often resisted the imposition. One important condition for mass conversion was a settled urban state, where churches, synagogues or mosques provided a focus for religion, as opposed to the free nomadic lifestyle of life on the open steppes. (Note: "The Șûfî wandering out into the steppe was far more effective in bringing Islam to the Turkic nomads than the learned 'ulamâ of the cities." (Golden 2007b, p. 126)) A tradition of the Iranian Judeo-Tats claims that their ancestors were responsible for the Khazar conversion. A legend traceable to the 16th-century Italian rabbi Judah Moscato attributed it to Yitzhak ha-Sangari.

Both the date of the conversion, and the extent of its influence beyond the elite, (Note: "the Khazars (most of whom did not convert to Judaism, but remained animists, or adopted Islam and Christianity)" (Wexler 2002, p. 514)) often minimised in some scholarship, (Note: "In much of the literature on conversions of Inner Asian peoples, attempts are made, 'to minimize the impact' ... This has certainly been true of some of the scholarship regarding the Khazars." (Golden 2007b, p. 127)) are a matter of dispute, (Note: "scholars who have contributed to the subject of the Khazars' conversion, have based their arguments on a limited corpus of textual, and more recently, numismatic evidence ... Taken together these sources offer a cacophony of distortions, contradictions, vested interests, and anomalies in some areas, and nothing but silence in others." (Olsson 2013, p. 496)) but at some point between 740 and 920 CE, the Khazar royalty and nobility appear to have converted to Judaism, in part, it is argued, perhaps to deflect competing pressures from Arabs and Byzantines to accept either Islam or Christianity. (Note: "Judaism was apparently chosen because it was a religion of the book without being the faith of a neighbouring state which had designs on Khazar lands." (Noonan 1999, p. 502)) (Note: "Their conversion to Judaism was the equivalent of a declaration of neutrality between the two rival powers." (Baron 1957, p. 198))

The conversion of the Khazars to Judaism is an emotionally charged topic in Israel, (Note: "in Israel, emotions are still high when it comes to the history of the Khazars, as I witnessed in a symposium on the issue at the Israeli Academy of Sciences in Jerusalem (May 24, 2011). Whereas Prof. Shaul Stampfer believed the story of the Khazars' conversion to Judaism was a collection of stories or legends that have no historical foundation, (and insisted that the Ashkenazi of Eastern Europe of today stem from Jews in Central Europe who emigrated eastwards), Prof. Dan Shapiro believed that the conversion of the Khazars to Judaism was part of the history of Russia at the time it established itself as a kingdom." (Falk 2017, p. 101, n. 9)) and two scholars, Moshe Gil (2011) and Shaul Stampfer, (2013) have challenged the authenticity of the medieval Hebrew documents and argue that the conversion of the Khazar elite to Judaism never happened. Alex M. Feldman is critical of Stampfer and Gil's dismissal of "overwhelming textual and archaeological evidence" of Khazarian Judaism, though agrees it is unlikely that Ashkenazim are descended from Khazarian Jews, he posits "a middle ground which can simultaneously accept Khazarian Judaism and doubt the Khazar-Ashkenazi descent theory advanced in dubious genetic studies."

==== History of discussions about Khazar Jewishness ====
The earliest surviving Arabic text that refers to Khazar Jewishness appears to be that which was written by Ibn Rustah, a Persian scholar who wrote an encyclopedic work on geography in the early tenth century. It is believed that ibn Rustah derived much of his information from the works of his contemporary Abu al-Jayhani based in Central Asia.

The 10th century Kievian Letter has Old Turkic (Orkhon) inscription word-phrase OKHQURÜM, "I read (this or it)".

Christian of Stavelot in his Expositio in Matthaeum Evangelistam (c. 860–870s) refers to Gazari, presumably Khazars, as living in the lands of Gog and Magog, who were circumcised and omnem Judaismum observat—observing all the laws of Judaism. (Note: "We are not aware of any nation under the sky that would not have Christians among them. For even in Gog and Magog, the Hunnic people who call themselves Gazari, those whom Alexander confined, there was a tribe more brave than the others. This tribe had already been circumcised and they profess all dogmata of Judaism (omnem Judaismum observat)." (Golden 2007b, p. 139)) New numismatic evidence of coins dated 837/8 bearing the inscriptions arḍ al-ḫazar "Land of the Khazars", or Mûsâ rasûl Allâh "Moses is the messenger of God", in imitation of the Islamic coin phrase "Muhammad is the messenger of God") suggest to many the conversion took place in that decade. (Note: The idea of a forced general conversion imposed on the khaganal dynasty in the 830s was advanced by Omeljian Pritsak, and is now supported by Roman Kovalev and Peter Golden (Olsson 2013, p. 497).) Olsson argues that the 837/8 evidence marks only the beginning of a long and difficult official Judaisation that concluded some decades later. (Note: Olsson identifies this with the onset of Magyar invasions of the Pontic steppe in the 830s, the construction of Sarkel, and the Schechter letter's reference to Bulan, converted to his Jewish wife Serakh's faith, wresting power, in a period of famine, elements which undermined the khagan, and allowed the creation of the royal diarchy (Olsson 2013, pp. 507, 513ff).) A 9th-century Jewish traveller, Eldad ha-Dani, is said to have informed Spanish Jews in 883 that there was a Jewish polity in the East, and that fragments of the legendary Ten Lost Tribes, part of the line of Simeon and half-line of Manasseh, dwelt in "the land of the Khazars", receiving tribute from some 25 to 28 kingdoms. Another view holds that by the 10th century, while the royal clan officially claimed Judaism, a non-normative variety of Islamisation took place among the majority of Khazars.

By the 10th century, the letter of King Joseph asserts that, after the royal conversion, "Israel returned (yashuvu yisra'el) with the people of Qazaria (to Judaism) in complete repentance (bi-teshuvah shelemah)." Persian historian Ibn al-Faqîh wrote that "all the Khazars are Jews, but they have been Judaized recently". Ibn Fadlân, based on his Caliphal mission (921–922) to the Volga Bulgars, also reported that "the core element of the state, the Khazars, were Judaized", (Note: wa al-ḥazarwa malikuhum kulluhum yahûd ("The Khazars and their king are all Jews") (Golden 2007b, pp. 143, 159)) something underwritten by the Qaraite scholar Ya'kub Qirqisânî around 937. (Note: Golden, citing his comment on Genesis 9:27: "some other commentators are of the opinion that this verse alludes to the Khazars who accepted Judaism", with Golden's comment: "Certainly, by this time, the association of Khazaria and Judaism in the Jewish world was an established fact" (Golden 2007b, p. 143).) The conversion appears to have occurred against a background of frictions arising from both an intensification of Byzantine missionary activity from the Crimea to the Caucasus, and Arab attempts to wrest control over the latter in the 8th century CE, and a revolt, put down, by the Khavars around the mid-9th century is often invoked as in part influenced by their refusal to accept Judaism. Modern scholars generally (Note: Shapira and Zuckerman disagree, positing only one stage and placing it later. Shapira takes stage 1 as a Jewish-Khazar reinterpretation of the Tengri-cult in terms of a monotheism similar to Judaism's; Zuckerman thinks Judaisation took place, just once, after 861 (Shapira 2007b, pp. 349, and n.178; Zuckerman 1995, p. 250).) see the conversion as a slow process through three stages, which accords with Richard Eaton's model of syncretic inclusion, gradual identification and, finally, displacement of the older tradition. (Note: Dunlop thought the first stage occurred with the king's conversion c. 740; the second with the installation of Rabbinical Judaism c. 800 (Golden 2007b, pp. 127–128, 151–153; Dunlop 1954, p. 170).)

Sometime between 954 and 961, Hasdai ibn Shaprut, from al-Andalus (Muslim Spain), wrote a letter of inquiry addressed to the ruler of Khazaria, and received a reply from Joseph of Khazaria. The exchanges of this Khazar Correspondence, together with the Schechter Letter discovered in the Cairo Geniza and the famous Platonizing dialogue by Judah Halevi, Sefer ha-Kuzari ("Book (of) The Khazari"), which plausibly drew on such sources, (Note: Arabic original: Kitâb al-ḥuyya wa'l-dalîl fi naṣr al-din al-dhalîl (Book of the Argument and Demonstration in Aid of the Despised Faith) (Schweid 2007, p. 279).) provide us with the only direct evidence of the indigenous traditions (Note: Brook mentions also a letter in Hebrew, the Mejelis document, dated 985–986, which refers to "our lord David, the Khazar prince" who lived in Taman. As Brook notes, both D. M. Dunlop and Dan Shapira dismiss it as a forgery (Brook 2010, pp. 30, 41, n.75).) concerning the conversion. King Bulan (Note: The name is commonly etymologized as meaning "elk" in Türkic. Shapira identifies him with the Sabriel of the Schechter letter, and suggests, since Sabriel is unattested as a Jewish name, although the root is "hope, believe, find out, understand" that it is a calque on the Oğuz Türkic bulan (one who finds out) or bilen (one who knows) (Shapira 2009, p. 1102).) is said to have driven out the sorcerers, (Note: Szpiech, citing the Letter of King Joseph: et ha-qosmim ve-et'ovdei avodah zarah ("expelled the wizards and idolators") (Szpiech 2012, pp. 93–117 [102]).) and to have received angelic visitations exhorting him to find the true religion, upon which, accompanied by his vizier, he travelled to desert mountains of Warsān on a seashore, where he came across a cave rising from the plain of Tiyul in which Jews used to celebrate the Sabbath. Here he was circumcised. (Note: This detail is in Halevi's Sefer Ha-Kusari. Golden has identified Warsān as Transcaucasian Varaˇc'an. Ḥasdai ibn Shaprūṭ's letter also mentions a legend that the Chaldaeans, under persecution, hid the Scriptures in a cave, and taught their sons to pray there, which they did until their descendants forgot the custom. Much later, a tradition has it, a man of Israel entered the cave and, retrieving the books, taught the descendants how to learn the Law.) Bulan is then said to have convened a royal debate between exponents of the three Abrahamic religions. He decided to convert when he was convinced of Judaism's superiority. Many scholars situate this c. 740, a date supported by Halevi's own account. The details are both Judaic (Note: The Schechter document has officers during the religious debate speak of a cave in a certain plain (TYZWL) where books are to be retrieved. They turn out to be the books of the Torah (DeWeese 1994, p. 303; Golb & Pritsak 1982, p. 111).) and Turkic: a Turkic ethnogonic myth speaks of an ancestral cave in which the Ashina were conceived from the mating of their human ancestor and a wolf ancestress. (Note: The original ancestral cavern of the Türks, according to Chinese sources, was called Ötüken, and the tribal leaders would travel there annually to conduct sacrificial rites (DeWeese 1994, pp. 276, 300–304).) These accounts suggest that there was a rationalising syncretism of native pagan traditions with Jewish law, by melding through the motif of the cave, a site of ancestral ritual and repository of forgotten sacred texts, Turkic myths of origin and Jewish notions of redemption of Israel's fallen people. It is generally agreed they adopted Rabbinical rather than Qaraite Judaism.

Ibn Fadlan reports that the settlement of disputes in Khazaria was adjudicated by judges hailing each from his community, be it Christian, Jewish, Muslim, or Pagan. Some evidence suggests that the Khazar king saw himself as a defender of Jews even beyond the kingdom's frontiers, retaliating against Muslim or Christian interests in Khazaria in the wake of Islamic and Byzantine persecutions of Jews abroad. (Note: Kohen refers to Khazar killings of Christians or the uncircumcised in retaliation for persecutions of Jews in Byzantium, and Khazar reprisals against Muslims for persecutions of Jews in Caucasian Albania, perhaps under Emir Nasr (Kohen 2007, pp. 107–108).) Ibn Fadlan recounts specifically an incident in which the king of Khazaria destroyed the minaret of a mosque in Atil as revenge for the destruction of a synagogue in Dâr al-Bâbûnaj, and allegedly said he would have done worse were it not for a fear that the Muslims might retaliate in turn against Jews. Hasdai ibn Shaprut sought information on Khazaria in the hope he might discover "a place on this earth where harassed Israel can rule itself" and wrote that, were it to prove true that Khazaria had such a king, he would not hesitate to forsake his high office and his family in order to emigrate there. (Note: "If indeed I could learn that this was the case, then, despising all my glory, abandoning my high estate, leaving my family, I would go over mountains and hills, through seas and lands, till I should arrive at the place where my Lord the King resides, that I might see not only his glory and magnificence, and that of his servants and ministers, but also the tranquillity of the Israelites. On beholding this my eyes would brighten, my reins would exult, my lips would pour forth praises to God, who has not withdrawn his favour from his afflicted ones." (Koestler 1977, p. 63; Leviant 2008, pp. 159–162))

Albert Harkavy noted in 1877 that an Arabic commentary on Isaiah 48:14 ascribed to Saadia Gaon or to the Karaite scholar Benjamin Nahâwandî, interpreted "The Lord hath loved him" as a reference "to the Khazars, who will go and destroy Babel" (i.e., Babylonia), a name used to designate the country of the Arabs. This has been taken as an indication of hopes by Jews that the Khazars might succeed in destroying the Caliphate.

=== Islam ===
In 965, as the Khaganate was struggling against the victorious campaign of the Rus' prince Sviatoslav, the Islamic historian Ibn al-Athîr mentions that Khazaria, attacked by the Oghuz, sought help from Khwarezm, but their appeal was rejected because they were regarded as "infidels" (al-kuffâr). Save for the king, the Khazarians are said to have converted to Islam in order to secure an alliance, and the Turks were, with Khwarezm's military assistance, repelled. It was this that, according to Ibn al-Athîr, led the Jewish king of Khazar to convert to Islam.

== Genetics ==
Nine skeletons dating to the 7th–9th centuries excavated from elite military burial mounds of the Khazar Khaganate (in the modern Rostov region) were analysed in two genetic studies (from 2019 and 2021). According to the 2019 study, the results "confirm the Turkic roots of the Khazars, but also highlight their ethnic diversity and some integration of conquered populations". The samples did not show a genetic connection to Ashkenazi Jews, and the results do not support the hypothesis of Ashkenazi Jews being descendants of the Khazars. In the 2021 study the results showed both European and East Asian paternal haplogroups in the samples: three individuals carried R1a Y-haplogroup, two had C2b, and the rest carried haplogroups G2a, N1a, Q, and R1b, respectively. According to the authors, "The Y-chromosome data are consistent with the results of the craniological study and genome-wide analysis of the same individuals in the sense that they show mixed genetic origins for the early medieval Khazar nobility". Their facial features were of mix of East Asian and European, with East Asian type dominating (70%) in the early Khazars.

== Claims of Khazar ancestry ==
Claims of Khazar origins of peoples, or suggestions that the Khazars were absorbed by them, have been made with regard to the Kazakhs, the Hungarians, the Judaising Slavic Subbotniks, the Muslim Karachays, the Kumyks, the Avars, the Cossacks of the Don and the Ukrainian Cossacks (see Khazar hypothesis of Cossack ancestry), the Turkic-speaking Krymchaks and their Crimean neighbours the Karaites, Mishar Tatars, the Moldavian Csángós and others. Turkic-speaking Crimean Karaites (known in the Crimean Tatar language as Qaraylar), some of whom migrated in the 19th century from the Crimea to Poland and Lithuania have claimed Khazar origins. Specialists in Khazar history question the connection. (Note: Rabbinic Judaism rather than Qaraism was the form adopted. Small Karaim communities may have existed, but the linguistic and historical evidence suggests that the Turkic-speaking Karaim Jews in Poland and Lithuania, of which one branch also existed in the Crimea, descend from the Khazars. "At most, it is conceivable that the smaller Karaite community which lived in Khazaria gained the Kipchak type Turkic language, that they speak today, through an exchange of language." Khazars probably converted to Rabbinic Judaism, whereas in Karaism only the Torah is accepted, the Talmud being ignored (Róna-Tas 1999, p. 232).) Scholarship is likewise sceptical of claims that the Tatar-speaking Krymchak Jews of the Crimea descend from Khazars.

=== Crimean Karaites and Krymchaks ===
In 1839, the Karaim scholar Abraham Firkovich was appointed by the Russian government as a researcher into the origins of the Jewish sect known as the Karaites. In 1846, one of his acquaintances, the Russian orientalist Vasilii Vasil'evich Grigor'ev (1816–1881), theorised that the Crimean Karaites were of Khazar stock. Firkovich vehemently rejected the idea, a position seconded by Firkovich, who hoped that by "proving" his people were of Turkic origin, he would secure them exception from Russian anti-Jewish laws, since they bore no responsibility for Christ's crucifixion. This idea has a notable impact in Crimean Karaite circles. (Note: "At a time when Russia masked imperialist goals by pretending to be the protector of Slavic peoples and the Orthodox faith, Crimean Karism was exercising its own version of cultural imperialism. It is clear that the Crimean Karaites intended to expand their dominion to include Cairo, Jerusalem, and Damascus, basing their pre-eminence on the claim that Karaism, an ancient, pre-Talmudic form of Judaism, had been brought to the Middle East by the Khazars. Such an allegation would, however, have been much more difficult, if not impossible, to maintain. To summarize the Khazar-Karaite nexus commonly accepted in the Russian Empire during the last century: the Khazars, who were of pagan Turkic origin, were supposedly brought to Judaism by Karaites, descendants of Jews who had lived in the Black Sea areas since biblical times and whose Judaism was, therefore, pre-Talmudic and nonrabbinic. As a result, the Khazars' Judaism was Karaite, and later Karaites, who spoken a Turkic language, must have descended from the Khazars, with whom the ancient Jews had assimilated. The circularity of the argument aside, modern historians have concluded that the Khazars were converted by Rabbanite Jews and that they and their descendants observed rabbinic law and traditions. Indeed, recent scholarship has demonstrated that Khazaria was altogether unrepresented in the Karaite literature of the ninth and early tenth centuries, as well as that written during its Golden Age – when Karaism had a militant and missionary influence.") It is now believed that he forged much of this material on Khazars and Karaites. Specialists in Khazar history also question the connection. A genetic study of European Karaites by Kevin Alan Brook found no evidence of a Khazar or Turkic origin for any uniparental lineage but did reveal the European Karaites' links to Egyptian Karaites and to Rabbinical Jewish communities.

Another Turkic Crimean group, the Krymchaks had retained very simple Jewish traditions, mostly devoid of halakhic content, and very much taken with magical superstitions which, in the wake of the enduring educational efforts of the great Sephardi scholar Chaim Hezekiah Medini, came to conform with traditional Judaism.

Though the assertion they were not of Jewish stock enabled many Crimean Karaites to survive the Holocaust, which led to the murder of 6,000 Krymchaks, after the war, many of the latter, somewhat indifferent to their Jewish heritage, took a cue from the Crimean Karaites, and denied this connection in order to avoid the antisemitic effects of the stigma attached to Jews.

=== Ashkenazi-Khazar theories ===
Several scholars have suggested that instead of disappearing after the dissolution of their Empire, the Khazars migrated westward and eventually, they formed part of the core of the later Ashkenazi Jewish population of Europe. This hypothesis is greeted with scepticism or caution by most scholars. (Note: "Most scholars are skeptical of the hypothesis". Wexler, who proposes a variation of the idea, argues that a combination of three reasons accounts for scholarly aversion to the concept: a desire not to get mixed up in controversy, ideological insecurities, and the incompetence of much earlier work in favour of that hypothesis.) (Note: "Methodologically, Wexler has opened up some new areas, taking elements of folk culture into account. I think that his conclusions have gone well beyond the evidence. Nonetheless, these are themes that should be pursued further." (Golden 2007a, p. 56)) (Note: "Arthur Koestler's book The Thirteenth Tribe which claimed that the converted Khazars were the progenitors of today's Ashkenazi Jews, has largely been rejected by serious scholars. However, the disputed theory that the stereotypical European Jew is descended from an Eastern European nation of Jewish converts, has been sufficiently unwelcome as to render study of the Khazars an area of research largely off limits for Jewish as well as Russian archaeologists, the Russians being unhappy with the prospect that their empire was initially ruled by Jewish kings, and the Jews being unhappy with the prospect that the Ashkenazim might not have a genetic connection to the freed slaves who met with God at Sinai." (Mariner 1999, pp. 95–96))

The German Orientalist Karl Neumann, in the context of an earlier controversy about possible connections between the Khazars and the ancestors of the Slavic peoples, suggested as early as 1847 that emigrant Khazars might have influenced the core population of Eastern European Jews. (Note: Kizilov 2014, p. 389 citing Karl Neumann, Die Völker des südlichen Russlands in ihrer geschichtlichen Entwicklung, (1847) 2nd ed. Teubner 1855 pp. 125–126.)

The theory was then taken up by Albert Harkavi in 1869, when he also claimed that a possible link existed between the Khazars and the Ashkenazim, (Note: Rossman 2002, p. 98: Abraham Harkavy, O yazykye evreyev, zhivshikh v drevneye vremya na Rusi i o slavianskikh slovakh, vstrechaiuschikhsia u evreiskikh pisatelei, St. Petersburg.) but the theory that Khazar converts formed a major proportion of the Ashkenazim was first proposed to the Western public in a lecture which was delivered by Ernest Renan in 1883. (Note: Barkun 1997, p. 137: Ernest Renan, "Judaism as a Race and as Religion." Delivered on 27 January 1883.) Occasional suggestions that there was a small Khazar component in East European Jews emerged in works by Joseph Jacobs (1886), Anatole Leroy-Beaulieu, a critic of antisemitism (1893), Maksymilian Ernest Gumplowicz, (Note: The source is Maksymilian Ernest Gumplowicz, Początki religii żydowskiej w Polsce, Warsaw: E. Wende i S-ka, 1903 (Polonsky, Basista & Link-Lenczowski 1993, p. 120)) and by the Russian-Jewish anthropologist Samuel Weissenberg. (Note: Goldstein writes "The theory that Eastern European Jews are descended from the Khazars was originally proposed by Samuel Weissenberg in an attempt to show that Jews were deeply rooted on Russian soil and the cradle of Jewish civilization was the Caucasus". Weissenberg's book Die Südrussischen Juden, was published in 1895.) In 1909, Hugo von Kutschera developed the notion into a book-length study, arguing that the Khazars formed the foundational core of the modern Ashkenazim. Maurice Fishberg introduced the notion to American audiences in 1911. The idea was also taken up by the Polish-Jewish economic historian and General Zionist Yitzhak Schipper in 1918. (Note: Schipper's first monograph on this was published in the Almanach Žydowski (Vienna) in 1918. While in the Warsaw ghetto before falling victim to the Holocaust at Majdanek, Schipper (1884–1943) was working on the Khazar hypothesis (Litman 1984, pp. 85–110 [109]).) Israel Bartal has suggested that from the Haskalah onwards, polemical pamphlets against the Khazars were inspired by Sephardi organisations which opposed the Khazaro-Ashkenazim.

Scholarly anthropologists, such as Roland B. Dixon (1923), and writers such as H. G. Wells (1920) used it to argue that "The main part of Jewry never was in Judea", (Note: "There were Arab tribes who were Jews in the time of Muhammad, and a Turkic people who were mainly Jews in South Russia in the ninth century. Judaism is indeed the reconstructed political ideal of many shattered peoples-mainly semitic. As a result of these coalescences and assimilations, almost everywhere in the towns throughout the Roman Empire, and far beyond it in the east, Jewish communities traded and flourished, and they were kept in touch through the Bible, and through a religious and educational organisation. The main part of Jewry never was in Judea and it had never come out of Judea." (Wells 1920, p. 570)) a thesis that was to have a political echo in later opinion. (Note: John Bagot Glubb held that Russian Jews "have considerably less Middle Eastern blood, consisting largely of pagan Slav proselytes or of Khazar Turks." For Glubb, they were not "descendants of the Judeans ...The Arabs of Palestine are probably more closely related to the Judeans (genetically) than are modern Russian or German Jews.... Of course, an anti-Zionist (as well as an anti-Semitic) point is being made here: The Palestinians have a greater political right to Palestine than the Jews do, as they, not the modern-day Jews, are the true descendants of the land's Jewish inhabitants/owners" (Morris 2003, p. 22).)

In 1932, Samuel Krauss ventured the theory that the biblical Ashkenaz referred to northern Asia Minor, and he identified it as the ancestral homeland of the Khazars, a position which was immediately disputed by Jacob Mann. Ten years later, in 1942, Abraham N. Polak (sometimes referred to as Poliak), later professor for the history of the Middle Ages at Tel Aviv University, published a Hebrew monograph in which he concluded that the East European Jews came from Khazaria. (Note: First written as an article in 1941 – "The Khazars' Conversion to Judaism", then written as a monograph (1943), it was revised twice, first, it was revised in 1944, and in 1951, it was revised again and it was also retitled Kazariyah: Toldot mamlacha yehudit be'Eropa (Khazaria: History of a Jewish Kingdom in Europe) Mosad Bialik, Tel Aviv, 1951.) (Note: "Poliak sought the origins of Eastern European Jewry in Khazaria" (Golden 2007a, p. 29).) D.M. Dunlop, writing in 1954, thought that very little evidence supported what he considered a mere assumption, and he also argued that the Ashkenazi-Khazar descent theory went far beyond what "our imperfect records" permit. In 1955, Léon Poliakov, who assumed that the Jews of Western Europe resulted from a "panmixia" in the first millennium, asserted that it was widely assumed that Europe's Eastern Jews were descended from a mixture of Khazarian and German Jews. (Note: "As for the Jews of Eastern Europe (Poles, Russians, etc.), it has always been assumed that they descended from an amalgamation of Jews of Khazar stock from southern Russia and German Jews (the latter having imposed their superior culture)." (Poliakov 2005, p. 285)) Poliak's work found some support in Salo Wittmayer Baron and Ben-Zion Dinur, (Note: Sand cites Salo Wittmayer Baron, "before and after the Mongol upheaval the Khazars sent many offshoots into the unsubdued Slavonic lands, helping ultimately to build up the great Jewish center of Eastern Europe"; as well as Ben-Zion Dinur: "The Russian conquests did not destroy the Khazar kingdom entirely, but they broke it up and diminished it. And this kingdom, which had absorbed Jewish immigration and refugees from many exiles, must itself have become a diaspora mother, the mother of one of the greatest of the diasporas (Em-galuyot, em akhat hagaluyot hagdolot)-of Israel in Russia, Lithuania and Poland.") (Note: "Salo Baron, who incorrectly viewed them as Finno-Ugrians, believed that the Khazars 'sent many offshoots into the unsubdued Slavonic lands, helping ultimately to build up the great Jewish centers of eastern Europe'" (Golden 2007a, p. 55)) but was dismissed by Bernard Weinryb as a fiction (1962). (Note: "dismissed ... rather airily" (Golden 2007a, p. 55).) Bernard Lewis was of the opinion that the word in Cairo Geniza interpreted as Khazaria is actually Hakkari and therefore it relates to the Kurds of the Hakkari mountains in southeast Turkey.

The Khazar-Ashkenazi hypothesis came to the attention of a much wider public with the publication of Arthur Koestler's The Thirteenth Tribe in 1976, which was both positively reviewed and dismissed as a fantasy, and a somewhat dangerous one. Israeli historian Zvi Ankori argued that Koestler had allowed his literary imagination to espouse Poliak's thesis, which most historians dismissed as speculative. Israel's ambassador to Britain branded it "an anti-Semitic action financed by the Palestinians", while Bernard Lewis claimed that the idea was not supported by any evidence whatsoever, and it had been abandoned by all serious scholars. (Note: "Some limit this denial to European Jews and make use of the theory that the Jews of Europe are not of Israelite descent at all but are the offspring of a tribe of Central Asian Turks converted to Judaism, called the Khazars. This theory, first put forward by an Austrian anthropologist in the early years of this century, is supported by no evidence whatsoever. It has long since been abandoned by all serious scholars in the field, including those in Arab countries, where Khazar theory is little used except in occasional political polemics." Assertions of this kind have been challenged by Paul Wexler who also notes that the arguments on this issue are riven by contrasting ideological investments: "Most writers who have supported the Ashkenazi-Khazar hypothesis have not argued their claims in a convincing manner ... The opponents of the Khazar-Ashkenazi nexus are no less guilty of empty polemics and unconvincing arguments.") Raphael Patai, however, registered some support for the idea that Khazar remnants had played a role in the growth of Eastern European Jewish communities, (Note: "it is assumed by all historians that those Jewish Khazars who survived the last fateful decades sought and found refuge in the bosom of Jewish communities in the Christian countries to the west, and especially in Russia and Poland, on the one hand, and in the Muslim countries to the east and the south, on the other. Some historians and anthropologists go so far as to consider the modern Jews of East Europe, and more particularly of Poland, the descendants of the medieval Khazars." (Patai & Patai 1989, p. 71)) and several amateur researchers, such as Boris Altschüler (1994), kept the thesis in the public eye. The theory has been occasionally manipulated to deny Jewish nationhood. Recently, a variety of approaches, from linguistics (Paul Wexler) to historiography (Shlomo Sand) and population genetics (Eran Elhaik, a geneticist from the University of Sheffield) have emerged to keep the theory alive. In a broad academic perspective, both the idea that the Khazars converted en masse to Judaism and the suggestion they emigrated to form the core population of Ashkenazi Jewry, remain highly polemical issues. One thesis held that the Khazar Jewish population went into a northern diaspora and had a significant impact on the rise of Ashkenazi Jews. Connected to this thesis is the theory, expounded by Paul Wexler, dissenting from the majority of Yiddish linguists, that the grammar of Yiddish contains a Khazar substrate.

==== Use in antisemitic polemic ====
According to Michael Barkun, while the Khazar hypothesis generally never played any major role in the development of anti-Semitism, it has exercised a noticeable influence on American antisemites since the restrictions on immigration were imposed in the 1920s. (Note: "The Khazar theory never figured as a major component of antisemitism. The connection receives only scant attention in Léon Poliakov's monumental history of the subject. It did however come to exercise a particular attraction for advocates of immigration restriction in America." (Barkun 1997, pp. 136–137)) (Note: "Although the Khazar theory gets surprisingly little attention in scholarly histories of anti-Semitism, it has been an influential theme among American anti-Semites since the immigration restrictionists of the 1920s" (Barkun 2012, p. 165).) Maurice Fishberg and Roland B. Dixon's works were later exploited in racist and religious polemical literature, particularly in literature which advocated British Israelism, both in Britain and the United States. (Note: "By the 1960s, when Christian identity was established as a force on the extreme right, the Khazar ancestry of the Jews was a firm article of faith. Two books, written in this milieu and widely read, came to exercise a strong influence in this regard. John Beaty's Iron Curtain over America (1951) and Wilmot Robertson's Dispossessed Majority (1972) repeated the Khazar thesis of Stoddard. Christian identity teachings readily seized on this negative reference to Russian Jewry, however, it backdated the history of intermarriage between Jews and Khazars to biblical times. In A Short History of Esau-Edom in Jewry (1948), the Vancouver-based writer C.F. Parker claimed that a tiny remnant of 'true Judah' was pitted against a large group of Idumean-Hittites who masqueraded as the true seed of Abraham and sought to expel the descendants of Jacob. These Esau-Hittites are the Ashkenazim, concentrated in Eastern and Central Europe and America." (Goodrick-Clarke 2003, p. 237)) Particularly after the publication of Burton J. Hendrick's The Jews in America, (1923) it began to enjoy a vogue among advocates of immigration restriction in the 1920s; racial theorists such as Lothrop Stoddard; antisemitic conspiracy-theorists such as the Ku Klux Klan's Hiram Wesley Evans; and some anti-communist polemicists such as John O. Beaty (Note: Beaty was an antisemitic, McCarthyite professor of Old English at SMU, author of The Iron Curtain over America (Dallas 1952). According to him, "the Khazar Jews ... were responsible for all of America's – and the world's ills, beginning with World War 1." The book "had little impact" until the former Wall Street broker and oil tycoon J. Russell Maguire promoted it (Boller 1992, pp. 2, 6–7; Barkun 1997, pp. 141–142).) and Wilmot Robertson, whose views influenced David Duke. According to Yehoshafat Harkabi (1968) and others, (Note: Wexler 2002, p. 514 has a more detailed bibliography.) it played a role in Arab anti-Zionist polemics, and took on an antisemitic edge. Bernard Lewis, noting in 1987 that Arab scholars had dropped it, remarked that it only occasionally emerged in Arab political discourse. (Note: "Arab anti-Semitism might have been expected to be free from the idea of racial odium, since Jews and Arabs are both regarded by race theory as Semites, but the odium is directed, not against the Semitic race, but against the Jews as a historical group. The main idea is that the Jews, racially, are a mongrel community, most of them being not Semites, but of Khazar and European origin." This essay was translated from Harkabi Hebrew text "Arab Antisemitism" in Shmuel Ettinger, Continuity and Discontinuity in Antisemitism, (Hebrew) 1968 (p.50).) It has also played some role in Soviet antisemitic chauvinism (Note: "in the very late 1980s Russian nationalists were fixated on the 'Khazar episode.' For them the Khazar issue seemed to be a crucial one. They treated it as the first historically documented case of the imposition of a foreign yoke on the Slavs, ... In this context the term 'Khazars' became popular as a euphemism for the so-called 'Jewish occupation regime'." (Shnirelman 2007, pp. 353–372)) and Slavic Eurasian historiography; particularly, in the works of scholars like Lev Gumilev, it came to be exploited by the white supremacist Christian Identity movement and even by terrorist esoteric cults like Aum Shinrikyō. The Kazar hypothesis was further exploited by esoteric fascists such as Miguel Serrano, referring to a lost Palestinabuch by the German Nazi-scholar Herman Wirth, who claimed to have proven that the Jews descended from a prehistoric migrant group parasiting on the Great Civilizations. The phrase "Khazar khaganate" gained new traction in 2000s among antisemitic nationalists in Russia, such as Yan Petrovsky. In online conspiracy videos, Khazarians are often portrayed connected with Rothschild family.

==== Genetic studies ====
The hypothesis of Khazarian ancestry in Ashkenazi has also been a subject of vehement disagreements in the field of population genetics, (Note: "The Khazar king and part of his court allegedly adopted the Jewish religion ... The truth of such a conversion and its extent has been the topic of many discussions, and the topic of vehement disagreements in our age of genomic DNA analyses." (Falk 2017, p. 100)) wherein claims have been made concerning evidence both for and against it. Eran Elhaik argued in 2012 for a significant Khazar component in the admixture of Ashkenazi Jews using Caucasian populations—Georgians, Armenians and Azerbaijani Jews—as proxies. (Note: "Strong evidence for the Khazarian hypothesis is the clustering of European Jews with the populations that reside on opposite ends of ancient Khazaria: Armenians, Georgians, and Azerbaijani Jews" (Elhaik 2012, pp. 61–74).) The evidence from historians he used has been criticised by Shaul Stampfer and the technical response to such a position from geneticists is mostly dismissive, arguing that, if traces of descent from Khazars exist in the Ashkenazi gene pool, the contribution would be quite minor, (Note: "During Greco-Roman times, recorded mass conversions led to 6 million people practicing Judaism in Roman times or up to 10% of the population of the Roman Empire. Thus, the genetic proximity of these European/Syrian Jewish populations, including Ashkenazi Jews, to each other and to French, Northern Italian, and Sardinian populations favors the idea of non-Semitic Mediterranean ancestry in the formation of the European/Syrian Jewish groups and is incompatible with theories that Ashkenazi Jews are for the most part the direct lineal descendants of converted Khazars or Slavs. The genetic proximity of Ashkenazi Jews to southern European populations has been observed in several other recent studies.. Admixture with local populations, including Khazars and Slavs, may have occurred subsequently during the 1000 year (2nd millennium) history of the European Jews. Based on analysis of Y chromosomal polymorphisms, Hammer estimated that the rate might have been as high as 0.5% per generation or 12.5% cumulatively (a figure derived from Motulsky), although this calculation might have underestimated the influx of European Y chromosomes during the initial formation of European Jewry. Notably, up to 50% of Ashkenazi Jewish Y chromosomal haplogroups (E3b, G, J1, and Q) are of Middle Eastern origin, whereas the other prevalent haplogroups (J2, R1a1, R1b) may be representative of the early European admixture. The 7.5% prevalence of the R1a1 haplogroup among Ashkenazi Jews has been interpreted as a possible marker for Slavic or Khazar admixture because this haplogroup is very common among Ukrainians (where it was thought to have originated), Russians, and Sorbs, as well as among Central Asian populations, although the admixture may have occurred with Ukrainians, Poles, or Russians, rather than Khazars." (Atzmon & Ostrer 2010, pp. 850–859)) or insignificant. One geneticist, Raphael Falk, has argued that "national and ethnic prejudices play a central role in the controversy." (Note: "The extent to which the Khazars contributed to the Jewish gene-pool, and more specifically to the Ashkenazi ethnic-group(s), has become a charged issue among expert scientists as well as nonprofessionals. National and ethnic prejudices play a central role in the controversy." (Falk 2017, p. 100)) According to Nadia Abu El-Haj, the issues of origins are generally complicated by the difficulties of writing history via genome studies and the biases of emotional investments in different narratives, depending on whether the emphasis lies on direct descent or on conversion within Jewish history. At the time of her writing, the lack of Khazar DNA samples that might allow verification also presented difficulties. (Note: "if the genome does not prove Sand wrong, neither can it prove him right. It is the wrong kind of evidence and the wrong style of reasoning for the task at hand." "They (researchers) will never be able to prove descent from Khazars: there are no 'verification' samples.")

== In literature ==
The Kuzari is an influential work written by the medieval Spanish Jewish philosopher and poet Rabbi Yehuda Halevi (c. 1075–1141). Divided into five essays (ma'amarim), it takes the form of a fictional dialogue between the pagan king of the Khazars and a Jew who was invited to instruct him in the tenets of the Jewish religion. The intent of the work, although based on Ḥasdai ibn Shaprūṭ's correspondence with the Khazar king, was not historical, but rather to defend Judaism as a revealed religion, written in the context, firstly of Karaite challenges to the Spanish rabbinical intelligentsia, and then against temptations to adapt Aristotelianism and Islamic philosophy to the Jewish faith. Originally written in Arabic, it was translated into Hebrew by Judah ibn Tibbon.

Benjamin Disraeli's early novel Alroy (1833) draws on Menachem ben Solomon's story. The question of mass religious conversion and the indeterminability of the truth of stories about identity and conversion are central themes of Milorad Pavić's best-selling mystery story Dictionary of the Khazars.

H.N. Turteltaub's Justinian, Marek Halter's Book of Abraham and Wind of the Khazars, and Michael Chabon's Gentlemen of the Road allude to or feature elements of Khazar history or create fictional Khazar characters.

== Cities associated with the Khazars ==
Cities associated with the Khazars include Atil, Khazaran, Samandar; in the Caucasus, Balanjar and Kazarki; in Crimea and the Taman region, Kerch, Theodosia, Yevpatoria (Güzliev), Samkarsh (also called Tmutarakan, Tamatarkha), and Sudak; and in the Don valley, Sarkel. A number of Khazar settlements have been discovered in the Mayaki-Saltovo region. Some scholars suppose that the Khazar settlement of Sambat on the Dnieper refers to the later Kiev. (Note: "Kiev in Khazar is Sambat, the same as the Hungarian word szombat, 'Saturday', which is likely to have been derived from the Khazar Jews living in Kyiv." (Róna-Tas 1999, p. 152))

== See also ==
- List of Khazar rulers
- Hormizd IV – his mother was a Khazar princess
- Leo IV the Khazar – his mother was a Khazar princess
- Theodora of Khazaria
- Bardanes Tourkos
- List of Jewish states and dynasties
- Rus' conquest of Khazar Khaganate

== Bibliography ==
- Abu El-Haj, Nadia (2012). The Genealogical Science: The Search for Jewish Origins and the Politics of Epistemology. Chicago, IL: University of Chicago Press. ISBN 978-0-226-20142-9 – via Google Books.
- Abulafia, David (1987) [First published 1952]. "Asia, Africa and the Trade of Medieval Europe". In Postan, Michael Moïssey; Habakkuk, H.J.; Miller, Edward (eds.). The Cambridge Economic History of Europe: Trade and industry in the Middle Ages. Vol. 2. Cambridge University Press. pp. 402–473. ISBN 978-0-521-08709-4 – via Google Books.
- Altschüler, Boris (1994). Geheimbericht aus der Grossen Steppe. Die Wahrheit über das Reich der Russen [Secret report from the Great Steppe. The truth about the empire of the Russians] (in German). Saarbrücken: Altschüler. ISBN 978-3-9803917-0-2 – via Google Books.
- Atzmon G, Hao L, Pe'er I, Velez C, Pearlman A, Palamara PF, Morrow B, Friedman E, Oddoux C, Burns E, Ostrer H (June 2010). "Abraham's children in the genome era: major Jewish diaspora populations comprise distinct genetic clusters with shared Middle Eastern Ancestry". American Journal of Human Genetics. 86 (6): 850–859. doi:10.1016/j.ajhg.2010.04.015. PMC 3032072. PMID 20560205.
- Bailey, H.W. (1949). "A Khotanese text concerning the Turks in Kanṭṣou" (PDF). Asia Major. New Series 1.1: 28–52. Archived (PDF) from the original on 26 January 2021.
- Bailey, H.W. (1951). "The Staël-Holstein Miscellany" (PDF). Asia Major. New Series 2.1: 1–45. Archived from the original (PDF) on 26 January 2021.
- Barkun, Michael (1997). Religion and the Racist Right: The Origins of the Christian Identity Movement. University of North Carolina Press. p. 141. ISBN 978-0-8078-4638-4 – via Internet Archive.
- Barkun, Michael (2012). "Anti-Semitism from Outer Space: The Protocols in the UFO Subculture". In Landes, Richard Allen; Katz, Steven T. (eds.). The Paranoid Apocalypse: A Hundred-year Retrospective on the Protocols of the Elders of Zion. New York University Press. pp. 163–171. ISBN 978-0-8147-4945-6 – via Google Books.
- Baron, Salo Wittmayer (1957). A Social and Religious History of the Jews. Vol. 3. Columbia University Press – via Google Books.
- Barthold, Vasili (1993) [First published 1936]. "Khazar". In Houtsma, Martijn Theodoor; Bosworth, C.E.; van Donzel, E.; Heinrichs, W.P. (eds.). First Encyclopedia of Islam, 1913–1936. Vol. 4. Brill. pp. 935–937. ISBN 978-90-04-09790-2 – via Google Books.
- Bauer, Susan Wise (2010). The History of the Medieval World: From the Conversion of Constantine to the First Crusade. New York, NY: W. W. Norton & Company. ISBN 978-0-393-07817-6 – via Google Books.
- Beckwith, Christopher I. (2011) [First published 2009]. Empires of the Silk Road: A History of Central Eurasia from the Bronze Age to the Present. Princeton, NJ: Princeton University Press. ISBN 978-0-691-15034-5 – via Google Books.
- Behar, D. M.; Metspalu, M.; Baran, Y.; Kopelman, N. M.; Yunusbayev, B.; Gladstein, A.; et al. (2013). "No Evidence of a Khazar origin for the Ashkenazi Jews". Human Biology. 85 (6): 859–900. doi:10.3378/027.085.0604. PMID 25079123. S2CID 2173604. Archived from the original on 14 October 2014.
- Behar, Doron M; Thomas, Mark G; Skorecki, Karl; Hammer, Michael F; et al. (October 2003). "Multiple Origins of Ashkenazi Levites: Y Chromosome Evidence for Both Near Eastern and European Ancestries". American Journal of Human Genetics. 73 (4): 768–779. doi:10.1086/378506. PMC 1180600. PMID 13680527.
- Blady, Ken (2000). Jewish Communities in Exotic Places. Rowman & Littlefield. ISBN 978-0-765-76112-5 – via Google Books.
- Boller, Paul F. (1992). Memoirs of an Obscure Professor: And Other Essays. TCU Press. ISBN 978-0-87565-097-5 – via Google Books.
- Bowersock, G.W. (2013). The Throne of Adulis: Red Sea Wars on the Eve of Islam. Oxford University Press. ISBN 978-0-199-33384-4 – via Google Books.
- Bowman, Stephen B.; Ankori, Zvi (2001). The Jews of Byzantium 1204–1453. Bloch Publishing Company. ISBN 978-0-8197-0703-1 – via Google Books.
- Brook, Kevin Alan (2006). The Jews of Khazaria. Lanham, Maryland: Rowman & Littlefield. p. 192. ISBN 978-1-4422-0302-0.
- Brook, Kevin Alan (2010) [First published 1999]. The Jews of Khazaria (2nd ed.). Rowman & Littlefield. ISBN 978-0-7425-4982-1. Archived from the original on 17 April 2023 – via Google Books.
- Brook, Kevin Alan (Summer 2014). "The Genetics of Crimean Karaites" (PDF). Karadeniz Arastirmalari. 11 (42): 69–84. doi:10.12787/KARAM859. Archived from the original (PDF) on 2 June 2019.
- Brook, Kevin Alan (2018). The Jews of Khazaria (3rd ed.). Rowman & Littlefield. ISBN 978-1-5381-0342-5.
- Brook, Kevin Alan (2022). The Maternal Genetic Lineages of Ashkenazic Jews. Academic Studies Press. ISBN 978-1-64469-984-3.
- Browning, Robert (1992) [First published 1980]. The Byzantine Empire (2nd ed.). Catholic University of America Press. p. 53. ISBN 978-0-8132-0754-4 – via Internet Archive.
- Brutzkus, J (1944). "The Khazar Origin of Ancient Kiev". Slavonic and East European Review. 3 (1) (2nd ed.): 108–124. doi:10.2307/3020228. JSTOR 3020228.
- Burrage Dixon, Roland (1923). The Racial History of Man. C. Scribners sons.
- Cahen, Claude (2011) [First published 1997]. L'Islam, des origines au début de l'Empire ottoman [Islam, from its origins to the beginning of the Ottoman Empire] (in French) (2nd ed.). Hachette. ISBN 978-2-8185-0155-9 – via Google Books.
- Cameron, Averil (1996). "Byzantines and Jews: some recent work on early Byzantium". Byzantine and Modern Greek Studies. 20: 249–274. doi:10.1179/byz.1996.20.1.249. S2CID 162277927.
- Cameron, Averil; Herrin, Judith (1984). Constantinople in the Early Eighth Century: The Parastaseis Syntomoi Chronikai: Introduction, Translation, and Commentary. Columbia Studies in the Classical Tradition. Vol. 10. Brill Archive. ISBN 978-90-04-07010-3 – via Google Books.
- Cohen, Mark R. (2005). The Voice of the Poor in the Middle Ages: An Anthology of Documents from the Cairo Geniza. Jews, Christians, and Muslims from the Ancient to the Modern World Series. Princeton University Press. ISBN 978-0-691-09271-3.
- Cokal, Susann (28 October 2007). "Jews With Swords". The New York Times. Archived from the original on 14 April 2012.
- Costa, M. D.; Pereira, Joana B.; Richards, Martin B. (8 October 2013). "A substantial prehistoric European ancestry amongst Ashkenazi maternal lineages". Nature Communications. 4 2543. Bibcode:2013NatCo...4.2543C. doi:10.1038/ncomms3543. PMC 3806353. PMID 24104924.
- Cross, Samuel Hazzard; Sherbowitz-Wetzor, Olgerd P., eds. (1953). The Russian Primary Chronicle (Laurentian text) (PDF). Translated by Cross, Samuel Hazzard; Sherbowitz-Wetzor, Olgerd P. Cambridge, MA: The Mediaeval Academy of America. Archived from the original (PDF) on 16 October 2013.
- Davies, Alan (1992). "The Keegstra Affair". In Davies, Alan (ed.). Antisemitism in Canada: History and Interpretation. Wilfrid Laurier University Press. pp. 227–248. ISBN 978-0-889-20216-0 – via Google Books.
- DeWeese, Devin A. (1994). Islamization and Native Religion in the Golden Horde: Baba Tükles and Conversion to Islam in Historical and Epic Tradition. Hermeneutics, Studies in the History of Religions. Penn State Press. ISBN 978-0-271-04445-3 – via Google Books.
- Dinur, Ben-Zion (1961). Yisrael ba-gola. Vol. 1 (3rd ed.). Bialik Institute.
- Dobrovits, M. (2004). "The Thirty Tribes of the Turks". Acta Orientalia Academiae Scientiarum Hungaricae. 57 (3): 259. doi:10.1556/aorient.57.2004.3.1.
- Dubnov, Simon (1980). History of the Jews: From the Roman Empire to the Early Medieval Period. Vol. 2. Associated University Presses. ISBN 978-0-8453-6659-2 – via Google Books.
- Dunlop, Douglas Morton (1954). History of the Jewish Khazars. New York, NY: Schocken Books – via Google Books.
- "Early History". A Country Study: Hungary. Library of Congress Country Studies. Federal Research Division, Library of Congress. September 1989. Archived from the original on 29 October 2004.
- Elhaik, Eran (December 2012). "The Missing Link of Jewish European Ancestry: Contrasting the Rhineland and the Khazarian Hypotheses". Genome Biology and Human Evolution. 5 (1): 61–74. arXiv:1208.1092. Bibcode:2012arXiv1208.1092E. doi:10.1093/gbe/evs119. PMC 3595026. PMID 23241444.
- Erdal, Marcel (2007). "The Khazar Language". In Golden, Peter B.; Ben-Shammai, Haggai; Róna-Tas, András (eds.). The World of the Khazars: New Perspectives. Handbuch der Orientalistik: Handbook of Uralic studies. Vol. 17. BRILL. pp. 75–108. ISBN 978-90-04-16042-2 – via Google Books.
- Falk, Raphael (2017). Zionism and the Biology of Jews. Springer. ISBN 978-3-319-57345-8 – via Google Books.
- Feldman, Louis H. (1996). Jew and Gentile in the Ancient World: Attitudes and Interactions from Alexander to Justinian. Princeton University Press. ISBN 978-1-4008-2080-1 – via Google Books.
- Feldman, Alex M. (2022a). "The Decline and Fall of Khazaria – Might or Money?". Vostok (Oriens) (4): 75–84. doi:10.31857/S086919080021412-0. S2CID 253192191. Archived from the original on 13 October 2022.
- Feldman, Alex M. (2022b). The Monotheisation of Pontic-Caspian Eurasia From the Eighth to the Thirteenth Century. Edinburgh Byzantine Studies. Edinburgh University Press. ISBN 978-1-474-47810-6.
- Fishberg, Maurice (1911). The Jews: A Study of Race and Environment. Scribner's – via Google Books.
- Geanakoplos, Deno John (1984). Byzantium: Church, Society, and Civilization Seen through Contemporary Eyes (2nd ed.). University of Chicago Press. ISBN 978-0-226-28461-3 – via Google Books.
- Gil, Moshe (July–December 2011). "Did the Khazars Convert to Judaism?". Revue des Études Juives. 170 (3–4): 429–441. doi:10.2143/REJ.170.3.2141801.
- Golb, Norman; Pritsak, Omeljan (1982). Khazarian Hebrew Documents of the Tenth Century. Cornell University Press. ISBN 978-0-8014-1221-9 – via Google Books.
- Golden, Peter B. (July 2018). "The Ethnogonic Tales of the Türks". The Medieval History Journal. 21 (2): 294. doi:10.1177/0971945818775373. S2CID 166026934.
- Golden, Peter Benjamin (1980). Khazar Studies: An Historio-Philological Inquiry into the Origins of the Khazars. Vol. 1, 2. Budapest: Akademia Kiado. ISBN 978-0-226-28461-3 – via Google Books.
- Golden, Peter Benjamin (1992). An Introduction to the History of the Turkic Peoples: Ethnogenesis And State Formation in the Medieval and Early Modern Eurasia and the Middle East. Turcologica. Vol. 9. Wiesbaden: O. Harrassowitz. ISBN 978-3-447-03274-2 – via Google Books.
- Golden, Peter Benjamin (1994a) [First published 1990]. "The peoples of the South Russian steppes". In Sinor, Denis (ed.). The Cambridge History of Early Inner Asia. Vol. 1. Cambridge University Press. pp. 256–283. ISBN 978-0-521-24304-9 – via Google Books.
- Golden, Peter Benjamin (1994b) [First published 1990]. "The peoples of the Russian forest belt". In Sinor, Denis (ed.). The Cambridge History of Early Inner Asia. Vol. 1. Cambridge University Press. pp. 230–255. ISBN 978-0-521-24304-9 – via Google Books.
- Golden, Peter Benjamin (2001a). "Nomads in the Sedentary World: The Case of Pre-Chinggisid Rus' and Georgia". In Khazanov, Anatoly M.; Wink, Andre (eds.). Nomads in the Sedentary World. Curzon-IIAS Asian studies series. Routledge. pp. 24–74. ISBN 978-0-7007-1369-1 – via Google Books.
- Golden, Peter Benjamin (2001b). "Nomad and Sedentary societies in Eurasia". In Adas, Michael (ed.). Agricultural and Pastoral Societies in Ancient and Classical History. Critical Perspectives on the Past Series. American Historical Association. Vol. 2. Temple University Press. pp. 71–115. ISBN 978-1-56639-832-9 – via Google Books.
- Golden, Peter Benjamin (2003). Nomads and their neighbours in the Russian steppe: Turks, Khazars and Qipchaqs. Ashgate. ISBN 978-0-86078-885-0 – via Google Books.
- Golden, Peter Benjamin (2006). "The Khazar Sacral Kingship". In Reyerson, Kathryn Von; Stavrou, Theofanis George; Tracy, James Donald (eds.). Pre-modern Russia and its world: Essays in Honour of Thomas S. Noonan. Otto Harrassowitz Verlag. pp. 79–102. ISBN 978-3-447-05425-6 – via Google Books.
- Golden, Peter Benjamin (2007a). "Khazar Studies: Achievements and Perspectives". In Golden, Peter B.; Ben-Shammai, Haggai; Róna-Tas, András (eds.). The World of the Khazars: New Perspectives. Handbook of Oriental Studies. Vol. 17. Brill. pp. 7–57. ISBN 978-90-04-16042-2 – via Google Books.
- Golden, Peter Benjamin (2007b). "The Conversion of the Khazars to Judaism". In Golden, Peter B.; Ben-Shammai, Haggai; Róna-Tas, András (eds.). The World of the Khazars: New Perspectives. Handbook of Oriental Studies. Vol. 17. Brill. pp. 123–161. doi:10.1163/ej.9789004160422.i-460.22. ISBN 978-90-04-16042-2 – via Google Books.
- Golden, Peter Benjamin (2007c). "Irano-Turcica: The Khazar Sacral Kingship Revisited". Acta Orientalia Academiae Scientiarum Hungaricae. 60 (2): 161–194. doi:10.1556/AOrient.60.2007.2.2 – via ResearchGate.
- Golden, Peter Benjamin (2010). Turks and Khazars: Origins, Institutions, and Interactions in Pre-Mongol Eurasia. Variorum Collected Studies Series. Vol. 952. Ashgate Publishing. ISBN 978-1-4094-0003-5 – via Google Books.
- Golden, Peter Benjamin (2011a). Central Asia in World History. New Oxford World History. Oxford University Press. ISBN 978-0-19-979317-4 – via Google Books.
- Golden, Peter Benjamin (2011b). Studies on the Peoples and Cultures of the Eurasian Steppes. Editura Academiei Române. ISBN 978-973-27-2152-0 – via ResearchGate.
- Goldstein, Eric L. (2006). The Price of Whiteness: Jews, Race, and American Identity. Princeton University Press. ISBN 978-0-691-12105-5 – via Google Books.
- Goldstein, Miriam (2011). Karaite Exegesis in Medieval Jerusalem. Mohr Siebeck. p. 9. ISBN 978-3-16-150972-8 – via Google Books.
- Goodman, David G.; Miyazawa, Masanori (2000) [First published 1995]. Jews in the Japanese Mind: The History and Uses of a Cultural Stereotype. Lexington Books. ISBN 978-0-7391-0167-4 – via Google Books.
- Goodrick-Clarke, Nicholas (2003) [First published 2001]. Black Sun: Aryan cults, esoteric nazism, and the politics of identity. NYU Press. ISBN 978-0-8147-3155-0 – via Google Books.
- Gow, Andrew Colin (1995). The " Red Jews": Antisemitism in the Apocalyptic Age 1200–1600. Brill Publishers. ISBN 978-90-04-10255-2 – via Google Books.
- HaLevi, Yehuda (1998). Korobkin, Nissan Daniel (ed.). The Kuzari: In Defense of the Despised Faith. Northvale, New Jersey-Jerusalem: Jason Aronson. ISBN 978-0-7657-9970-8 – via Google Books.
- HaLevi, Yehudah (2013). Korobkin, N. Daniel (ed.). The Kuzari. In Defense of the Despised Faith (2nd ed.). Feldheim Publishers. ISBN 978-1-59826-961-1. Archived from the original on 3 June 2023 – via Google Books.
- Harkabi, Yehoshafat (1987) [First published 1968]. "Contemporary Arab Anti-Semitism: its Causes and Roots". In Fein, Helen (ed.). The Persisting Question: Sociological Perspectives and Social Contexts of Modern Antisemitism. Walter de Gruyter. pp. 412–427. ISBN 978-3-11-010170-6 – via Google Books.
- Heath, Ian (1979). Byzantine Armies 886-1118. Osprey Publishing. ISBN 978-0-85045306-5.
- Herlihy, David (1984). "Demography". In Strayer, Joseph R. (ed.). Dictionary of the Middle Ages. Vol. 4. Charles Scribner's Sons. pp. 136–148. ISBN 978-0-684-17024-4.
- Howorth, H. H. (1870). "On the Westerly Drifting of Nomades, from the Fifth to the Nineteenth Century. Part IV. The Circassians and White Khazars". The Journal of the Ethnological Society of London. 2 (2): 182–192. doi:10.2307/3014425. JSTOR 3014425.
- Inaba, Minoru; Balogh, Dániel (2020). "The legend of Xinnie in the seventh and eighth centuries". In Balogh, Dániel (ed.). Hunnic Peoples in Central and South Asia: Sources for their Origin and History. Barkhuis. pp. 103–107. ISBN 978-9-493-19401-4 – via Google Books.
- Kaegi, Walter Emil (2003). Heraclius, Emperor of Byzantium (2nd ed.). Cambridge University Press. ISBN 978-0-521-81459-1 – via Google Books.
- "Khazar". Encyclopædia Britannica. 29 March 2020. Archived from the original on 2 March 2022.
- Kim, Hyun Jin (2016). The Huns. Routledge. ISBN 978-1-317-34090-4 – via Google Books.
- Kizilov, Mikhail (2009). The Karaites of Galicia: An Ethnoreligious Minority Among the Ashkenazim, the Turks, and the Slavs, 1772–1945. Brill. ISBN 978-90-04-16602-8 – via Google Books.
- Kizilov, Mikhail (2014). "National Inventions: The Imperial Emancipation of the Karaites from Jewishness". In Cvetkovski, Roland; Hofmeister, Alexis (eds.). An Empire of Others: Creating Ethnographic Knowledge in Imperial Russia and the USSR. Central European University Press. pp. 369–393. ISBN 978-6-155-22576-5 – via Google Books.
- Koestler, Arthur (1977) [First published 1976]. The Thirteenth Tribe: The Khazar Empire and Its Heritage. London: Pan Books. ISBN 978-0-09-125550-3 – via Google Books.
- Kohen, Elli (2007). History of the Byzantine Jews: A Microcosmos in the Thousand Year Empire. University Press of America. ISBN 978-0-7618-3623-0 – via Google Books.
- Kolditz, Sebastian (2017). "Barbarian Emperors? Aspects of the Byzantine Perception of the qaghan (chaganos) in the Earlier Middle Ages". In Scholl, Christian; Gebhardt, Torben R.; Clauß, Jan (eds.). Transcultural Approaches to the Concept of Imperial Rule in the Middle Ages. Peter Lang. pp. 41–76. ISBN 978-3-631-70624-4. Archived from the original on 21 April 2021.
- Kordosis, Stefanos (2017). "The Tibetan Title Dru gu Gesar (Turk Caesar / Caesar of the Turks) in the Northern Branch of the Silk Route and the Role of the Khazars". Θησαυρισματα (47): 183–192. Archived from the original on 23 December 2021.
- Kornienko, I. V.; Faleeva, T. G.; Schurr, T. G.; Aramova, O. Yu; Ochir-Goryaeva, M. A.; Batieva, E. F.; Vdovchenkov, E. V.; Moshkov, N. E.; Kukanova, V. V.; Ivanov, I. N.; Sidorenko, Yu S. (1 April 2021). "Y-Chromosome Haplogroup Diversity in Khazar Burials from Southern Russia". Russian Journal of Genetics. 57 (4): 477–488. doi:10.1134/S1022795421040049. ISSN 1608-3369. S2CID 233479468 – via ResearchGate.
- Kovalev, R.K. (2005). "Creating Khazar Identity through Coins: the Special Issue Dirhams of 837/838". In Curta, Florin (ed.). East Central and Eastern Europe in the Early Middle Ages. Ann Arbor: University of Michigan Press. pp. 220–251. ISBN 978-0-472-11498-6.

Kovalev, R. K. (2004). "What Does Historical Numismatics Suggest About the Monetary History of Khazaria in the Ninth Century? – Question Revisited". Archivum Eurasiae Medii Aevi. 13: 97–129. ISSN 0724-8822.

- von Kutschera, Hugo (1909). Die Chasaren; historische Studie [Those Khazars; historical Study] (in German). A. Holzhauen. ISBN 978-0-274-47307-6 – via Google Books.
- Lee, Joo-Yup (2016). "The Historical Meaning of the Term Turk and the Nature of the Turkic Identity of the Chinggisid and Timurid Elites in Post-Mongol Central Asia". Central Asiatic Journal. 59 (1–2): 101–132. doi:10.13173/centasiaj.59.1-2.0101. Archived from the original on 23 December 2021.
- Leviant, Curt (2008) [First published 1969]. Masterpieces of Hebrew Literature: Selections from 2000 Years of Jewish Creativity. Jewish Publication Society. ISBN 978-0-8276-0954-9 – via Google Books.
- Lewis, Bernard (1987) [First published 1986]. Semites and Anti-Semites: An Inquiry Into Conflict and Prejudice. New York: W. W. Norton & Company. ISBN 978-0-393-30420-6 – via Internet Archive.
- Lewis, Bernard (2013). The Jews of Islam. Routledge. ISBN 978-1-135-03021-6 – via Google Books.
- Litman, Jacob (1984). The Economic Role of Jews in Medieval Poland: The Contribution of Yitzhak Schipper. University Press of America. ISBN 978-0-8191-4244-3 – via Google Books.
- Lobel, Diana (2000). Between Mysticism and Philosophy: Sufi Language of Religious Experience in Experience in Judah Ha-Levi's Kuzari. SUNY Press. ISBN 978-0-7914-4451-1 – via Google Books.
- Logan, F. Donald (1992) [First published 1983]. The Vikings in History (2nd ed.). Routledge. ISBN 978-0-415-08396-6 – via Google Books.
- Luttwak, Edward N. (2009). The Grand Strategy of the Byzantine Empire. Harvard University Press. ISBN 978-0-674-03519-5 – via Google Books.
- "Magyars". WebChron: The Web Chronology Project. Archived from the original on 11 April 2020.
- Makkai, László (1994). "The Hungarians' Prehistory, Their Conquest of Hungary and their raids to the West". In Sugar, Peter F.; Hanák, Péter; Frank, Tibor (eds.). A History of Hungary. Indiana University Press. p. 11. ISBN 0-253-35578-8 – via Google Books.
- Mako, Gerald (2010). "The Possible Reasons for the Arab-Khazar Wars". Archivum Eurasiae Medii Aevi. 17: 45–57. Archived from the original on 23 August 2021.
- Malkiel, David (2008). Reconstructing Ashkenaz: The Human Face of Franco-German Jewry, 1000–1250. Stanford University Press. ISBN 978-0-8047-8684-3 – via Google Books.
- Mango, Cyril, ed. (2002). The Oxford History of Byzantium. Oxford University Press. ISBN 978-0-19-814098-6.
- Mariner, Rodney (1999). "Conversion to Judaism: a tale of the good, the bad and the ungrateful". In Lamb, Christopher; Bryant, M. Darroll (eds.). Religious Conversion: Contemporary Practices and Controversies. A&C Black. pp. 89–101. ISBN 978-0-826-43713-6 – via Google Books.
- Maroney, Eric (2010). The Other Zions: The Lost Histories of Jewish Nations. Rowman & Littlefield. p. 55. ISBN 978-1-4422-0045-6 – via Internet Archive.
- Meduza (8 July 2022). Мы хотим убивать "Медуза" рассказывает, как (и зачем) неонацисты из России отправились "денацифицировать" Украину [We want to kill "Meduza" tells how (and why) neo-Nazis from Russia set out to "denazify" Ukraine]. Meduza (in Russian). Archived from the original on 8 July 2022.
- Melamed, Avraham (2003). Goodman, Lenn Evan (ed.). The Philosopher-King in Medieval and Renaissance Jewish Political Thought. SUNY Press. ISBN 978-0-7914-8770-9 – via Google Books.
- Meserve, Margaret (2009). Empires of Islam in Renaissance Historical Thought. Harvard Historical Series. Vol. 158. Harvard University Press. ISBN 978-0-674-02656-8 – via Google Books.
- Mikheyev, Alexander S.; Qiu, Lijun; Zarubin, Alexei; Moshkov, Nikita; Orlov, Yuri; Chartier, Duane R.; Kornienko, Igor V.; Faleeva, Tatyana G.; Klyuchnikov, Vladimir; Batieva, Elena F.; Tatarinova, Tatiana V. (16 December 2019). "Diverse genetic origins of medieval steppe nomad conquerors". bioRxiv 10.1101/2019.12.15.876912.
- Miller, Philip E. (1993). Karaite Separatism in Nineteenth-Century Russia: Joseph Solomon Lutski's Epistle of Israel's Deliverance. Cincinnati: Hebrew Union College Press. ISBN 978-0-878-20137-2 – via Google Books.
- Morris, Benny (2003) [First published 2002]. The Road to Jerusalem: Glubb Pasha, Palestine and the Jews. I. B. Tauris. ISBN 978-1-86064-989-9 – via Google Books.
- Moss, Walter (2002) [First published 1997]. A History of Russia: To 1917. Anthem Russian and Slavonic studies. Vol. 1. Anthem Press. ISBN 978-0-85728-752-6 – via Google Books.
- Nebel, Almut; Filon, Dvora; Brinkmann, B (2001). "The Y chromosome pool of Jews as part of the genetic landscape of the Middle East". American Journal of Human Genetics. 69 (5): 1095–1112. doi:10.1086/324070. PMC 1274378. PMID 11573163.
- Nebel, Almut; Filon, Dvora; Faerman, Marina (March 2005). "Y chromosome evidence for a founder effect in Ashkenazi Jews". European Journal of Human Genetics. 13 (3): 388–391. doi:10.1038/sj.ejhg.5201319. PMID 15523495. S2CID 1466556.
- Noonan, Thomas S. (1999). "European Russia c500-c1050". In Reuter, Timothy; McKitterick, Rosamond (eds.). The New Cambridge Medieval History: Volume 3, C.900-c.1024. Vol. 3. Cambridge University Press. pp. 485–534. ISBN 978-0-521-36447-8 – via Google Books.
- Noonan, Thomas S. (2001). "The Khazar Qaghanate and its impact on the early Rus' state: the Translatio Imperii from Itil to Kiev". In Khazanov, Anatoly M.; Wink, André (eds.). Nomads in the Sedentary World. Curzon-IIAS Asian studies series. Routledge. pp. 76–102. ISBN 978-0-7007-1369-1 – via Google Books.
- Noonan, Thomas S. (2007). "The Economy of the Khazar Khaganate". In Golden, Peter B.; Ben-Shammai, Haggai; Róna-Tas, András (eds.). The World of the Khazars: New Perspectives. Handbuch der Orientalistik: Handbook of Uralic studies. Vol. 17. Brill. pp. 207–244. ISBN 978-90-04-16042-2. Archived from the original on 15 April 2023 – via Google Books.
- Olsson, Joshua T. (2013). "Coup d'état, Coronation and Conversion: Some Reflections on the Adoption of Judaism by the Khazar Khaganate". Journal of the Royal Asiatic Society. 23 (4): 495–526. doi:10.1017/S1356186313000266. S2CID 161833156.
- Oppenheim, Samuel A (1994). "Jews". In Olson, James Stuart; Pappas, Lee Brigance; Pappas, Charles (eds.). An Ethnohistorical Dictionary of the Russian and Soviet Empires. Greenwood Publishing Group. pp. 305–328. ISBN 978-0-313-27497-8 – via Google Books.
- Ostrer, Harry (2012). Legacy: A Genetic History of the Jewish People. Oxford University Press. ISBN 978-0-19-997638-6 – via Google Books.
- Ostrogorski, George (1969). History of the Byzantine State. Rutgers University Press. ISBN 978-0-8135-0599-2 – via Internet Archive.
- Patai, Raphael; Patai, Jennifer (1989) [First published 1975]. The Myth of the Jewish Race. Wayne State University Press. ISBN 978-0-8143-1948-2 – via Google Books.
- Peacock, Andrew C.S. (2010). Early Seljūq History: A New Interpretation. Routledge. ISBN 978-0-415-54853-3 – via Google Books.
- Petrukhin, Vladimir (2007). "Khazaria and Rus': An Examination of their Historical Relations". In Golden, Peter B.; Ben-Shammai, Haggai; Róna-Tas, András (eds.). The World of the Khazars: New Perspectives. Handbuch der Orientalistik: Handbook of Uralic studies. Vol. 17. BRILL. pp. 245–268. ISBN 978-90-04-16042-2 – via Google Books.
- Petrukhin, Vladimir; Flyorov, Valeriy (2010). "Iudaizm v Khazarii po dannym arkheologii" Иудаизм в Хазарии по данным археологии [Judaism in Khazaria according to Archaeological Data]. In Bartal, Israel; Kulik, Alexander (eds.). Istoriya yevreyskogo naroda v Rossii. Ot drevnosti do rannego Novogo vremeni История еврейского народа в России. От древности до раннего Нового времени [History of Jewish People in Russia. From Antiquity to the Early Modern Period] (in Russian). Vol. 1. Moscow; Jerusalem: Bridges of Culture; Gerashim. pp. 149–161. ISBN 978-5-457-51756-1.
- Piltz, Elisabeth (2004) [First published 1997]. "Middle Byzantine Court Costume". In Maguire, Henry (ed.). Byzantine Court Culture from 829 To 1204. Dumbarton Oaks. pp. 39–52. ISBN 978-0-88402-308-1 – via Google Books.
- Poliakov, Léon (2005) [1955/1975]. The History of Anti-semitism: From the time of Christ to the court Jews. University of Pennsylvania Press. ISBN 978-0-8122-1863-3 – via Google Books.
- Polonsky, Antony; Basista, Jakub; Link-Lenczowski, Andrzej, eds. (1993). The Jews in Old Poland: 1000–1795. I. B. Tauris. ISBN 978-1-85043-342-2 – via Google Books.
- Pritsak, Omeljan (September 1978). "The Khazar Kingdom's Conversion to Judaism" (PDF). Harvard Ukrainian Studies. II (3): 261–281. Archived (PDF) from the original on 11 January 2022.
- Reuter, Timothy, ed. (1999). The New Cambridge Medieval History, Volume 3, c.900–c.1024. Cambridge University Press. doi:10.1017/CHOL9780521364478. ISBN 978-1-13905572-7.
- Rezakhani, Khodadad (2017). ReOrienting the Sasanians: East Iran in Late Antiquity. Edinburgh University Press. ISBN 978-1-474-40031-2 – via Google Books.
- Róna-Tas, András (1999). Hungarians & Europe in the Early Middle Ages: An Introduction to Early Hungarian History. Central European University Press. ISBN 978-963-9116-48-1 – via Google Books.
- Rossman, Vadim Joseph (2002). Russian Intellectual Antisemitism in the Post-Communist Era. University of Nebraska Press. ISBN 978-0-8032-3948-7 – via Google Books.
- Rossman, Vadim Joseph (2007). "Anti-Semitism in Eurasian Historiography: The Caser of Lev Gumilev". In Shlapentokh, Dmitry (ed.). Russia Between East and West: Scholarly Debates on Eurasianism. International Studies in Sociology and Social Anthropology. Vol. 102. BRILL. pp. 121–188. ISBN 978-90-04-15415-5 – via Google Books.
- Rubin, Rita (7 May 2013). "'Jews a Race' Genetic Theory Comes Under Fierce Attack by DNA Expert". The Forward. Archived from the original on 19 July 2014.
- Russell, Josiah C. (1972). "The Population in Europe". In Cipolla, Carlo M. (ed.). The Fontana Economic History of Europe: The Middle Ages. Vol. 1. Collins/Fontana. pp. 25–71. Archived from the original on 29 October 2014.
- Sand, Shlomo (2010) [First published 2009]. The Invention of the Jewish People. London: Verso Books. ISBN 978-1-84467-623-1 – via Internet Archive.
- Schama, Simon (2013). The Story of the Jews: Finding the Words (1000 BCE – 1492). Random House. ISBN 978-1-409-04004-0 – via Google Books.
- Schwartzwald, Jack L. (2015). The Collapse and Recovery of Europe, AD 476-1648. McFarland. ISBN 978-1-476-66230-5. Archived from the original on 15 April 2023 – via Google Books.
- Schweid, Eliezer (2007). "The Khazar motif in Judah Halevi's Sefer ha-Kuzari". In Golden, Peter B.; Ben-Shammai, Haggai; Róna-Tas, András (eds.). The World of the Khazars: New Perspectives. Handbuch der Orientalistik: Handbook of Uralic studies. Vol. 17. Brill. pp. 279–290. ISBN 978-90-04-16042-2 – via Google Books.
- Serrano, Miguel (2011) [First published 1984]. Adolf Hitler, the Ultimate Avatar. Editorial Solar. pp. 79, 295 – via Internet Archive.
- Shapira, Dan D. Y. (2009). "Jews in Khazaria". In Ehrlich, Mark Avrum (ed.). Encyclopedia of the Jewish Diaspora: Origins, Experiences, and Culture. Vol. 3: (Countries, Regions, and Communities). ABC-CLIO. pp. 1097–1104. ISBN 978-1-85109-873-6 – via Google Books.
- Shapira, Dan D.Y. (2006). "Remarks on Avraham Firkovicz and the Hebrew Mejelis "Document"" (PDF). Acta Orientalia Academiae Scientiarum Hungaricae. 59 (2): 131–180. doi:10.1556/AOrient.59.2006.2.1.
- Shapira, Dan D.Y. (2007a). "Iranian Sources on the Khazars". In Golden, Peter B.; Ben-Shammai, Haggai; Róna-Tas, András (eds.). The World of the Khazars: New Perspectives. Vol. 17. Brill. pp. 291–305. ISBN 978-90-04-16042-2 – via Google Books.
- Shapira, Dan D.Y. (2007b). "Armenian and Georgian Sources on the Khazars – A Re-Evaluation". In Golden, Peter B.; Ben-Shammai, Haggai; Róna-Tas, András (eds.). The World of the Khazars: New Perspectives. Handbook of Oriental Studies. Vol. 17. Brill. pp. 307–351. ISBN 978-90-04-16042-2 – via Google Books.
- Shepard, Jonathan (2006). "Closer Encounters with the Byzantine World: The Rus at the Straits of Kerch". In Reyerson, Kathryn Von; Stavrou, Theofanis George; Tracy, James Donald (eds.). Pre-modern Russia and its world: Essays in Honour of Thomas S. Noonan. Otto Harrassowitz Verlag. pp. 15–77. ISBN 978-3-447-05425-6 – via Google Books.
- Shingiray, Irina Lita (2012). "Ethos, Materiality and Paradigms of Political Action in Early Medieval Communities of the Northwestern Caspian Region". In Hartley, Charles W.; Yazicioğlu, G. Bike; Smith, Adam T. (eds.). The Archaeology of Power and Politics in Eurasia: Regimes and Revolutions. Cambridge University Press. pp. 188–216. ISBN 978-1-107-01652-1 – via Google Books.
- Shirota, Shun (城田俊) (2005). Woods, John E.; Pfeiffer, Judith; Tucker, Ernest (eds.). "The Chinese Chroniclers of the Khazars: Notes on Khazaria in Tang Period Texts". Archivum Eurasiae Medii Aevi. 14: 231–261.
- Shnirelman, Victor A (2007). "The Story of an Euphemism: The Khazars in Russian Nationalist Literature". In Golden, Peter B.; Ben-Shammai, Haggai; Róna-Tas, András (eds.). The World of the Khazars: New Perspectives. Handbuch der Orientalistik: Handbook of Uralic studies. Vol. 17. Brill. pp. 353–372. ISBN 978-90-04-16042-2 – via Google Books.
- Sima Guang; et al. vol. 196. Chinese Text Project. Archived from the original on 13 November 2020.
- Singerman, Robert (2004). "Contemporary Racist and Judeophobic Ideology Discovers the Khazars, or, Who Really Are the Jews?" (PDF). Rosaline and Myer Feinstein Lecture Series. Archived from the original (PDF) on 5 March 2014.
- Sneath, David (2007). The Headless State: Aristocratic Orders, Kinship Society, and Misrepresentations of Nomadic Inner Asia. Columbia University Press. ISBN 978-0-231-51167-4 – via Google Books.
- Somogyi, Péter (2008). "New remarks on the flow of Byzantine coins in Avaria and Walachia during the second half of the seventh century". In Curta, Florin; Kovalev, Roman (eds.). The "Other" Europe in the Middle Ages: Avars, Bulgars, Khazars and Cumans. East Central and Eastern Europe in the Middle Ages, 450–1450. Vol. 2. Brill. pp. 83–149. ISBN 978-90-04-16389-8 – via Google Books.
- Spinei, Victor (2009). The Romanians and the Turkic Nomads North of the Danube Delta from the Tenth to the Mid-Thirteenth Century. BRILL. ISBN 978-9-004-17536-5 – via Google Books.
- Spolsky, Bernard (2014). The Languages of the Jews: A Sociolinguistic History. Cambridge University Press. ISBN 978-1-107-05544-5 – via Google Books.
- Stampfer, Shaul (2013). "Did the Khazars Convert to Judaism?" (PDF). Jewish Social Studies. 19 (3): 1–72. doi:10.2979/jewisocistud.19.3.1. S2CID 161320785 – via Project MUSE.
- Stampfer, Shaul (2014). "Are We All Khazars Now?". Jewish Review of Books. pp. 1–72. Archived from the original on 1 May 2016.
- Szádeczky-Kardoss, Samuel (1994) [First published 1990]. "The Avars". In Sinor, Denis (ed.). The Cambridge History of Early Inner Asia. Handbook of Oriental Studies. Vol. 1. Cambridge University Press. pp. 206–228. ISBN 978-0-521-24304-9 – via Google Books.
- Szpiech, Ryan (2012). Conversion and Narrative: Reading and Religious Authority in Medieval Polemic. University of Pennsylvania Press. ISBN 978-0-8122-0761-3 – via Google Books.
- Szyszman, Simon [in French] (1980). Le karaïsme: ses doctrines et son histoire [Karaism: its doctrines and its history] (in French). Éditions L'Âge d'Homme. ISBN 978-2-8251-3088-9 – via Google Books.
- Taagepera, Rein (September 1997). "Expansion and Contraction Patterns of Large Polities: Context for Russia". International Studies Quarterly. 41 (3): 496. doi:10.1111/0020-8833.00053. JSTOR 2600793. Archived from the original on 19 November 2018.
- Tangshu, Jiu; Jiu Tangshu. Vol. 199b Tiele (in Chinese). Archived from the original on 16 May 2011.
- Toch, Michael (2012). The Economic History of European Jews: Late Antiquity and Early Middle Ages. Études sur le Judaïsme Médiéval. Vol. 56. Leiden: Brill Publishers. ISBN 978-90-04-23534-2 – via Google Books.
- Toynbee, Arnold (1962) [1934–1961]. A Study of History. Vol. 1–12. Oxford University Press.
- Turchin, Peter; Adams, Jonathan M.; Hall, Thomas D (December 2006). "East-West Orientation of Historical Empires". Journal of World-Systems Research. 12 (2): 222. ISSN 1076-156X. Archived from the original on 20 May 2019.
- Wachtel, Andrew (1998). Making a Nation, Breaking a Nation: Literature and Cultural Politics in Yugoslavia. Stanford University Press. pp. 210–215. ISBN 978-0-8047-3181-2 – via Google Books.
- Wang, Pu; et al. Tang Huiyao (in Chinese). Vol. 98. Archived from the original on 19 January 2021.
- Wang, Pu; et al. Tang Huiyao (in Chinese). Vol. 72. Archived from the original on 4 November 2020.
- Wasserstein, David (2007). "The Khazars and the World of Islam". In Golden, Peter B.; Ben-Shammai, Haggai; Róna-Tas, András (eds.). The World of the Khazars: New Perspectives. Handbuch der Orientalistik: Handbook of Uralic studies. Vol. 17. Brill. pp. 373–386. ISBN 978-90-04-16042-2 – via Google Books.
- Wei, Zheng; et al. "vol. 84". Book of Sui (in Chinese). Archived from the original on 11 December 2022.
- Weinryb, Bernard Dov (1973a). The Jews of Poland: A Social and Economic History of the Jewish Community in Poland from 1100 to 1800. Jewish Publication Society. pp. 21–22. ISBN 978-0-8276-0016-4 – via Google Books.
- Weinryb, Bernard Dov (1973b). The Jews of Poland: A Social and Economic History of the Jewish Community in Poland from 1100 to 1800 he non-Jewish origins of the Sephardic Jews. Jewish Publication Society. ISBN 978-0-8276-0016-4 – via Google Books.
- Wells, H. G. (1920). The Outline of History: Being a Plain History of Life and Mankind. Vol. 1. Macmillan. Archived from the original on 13 July 2020.
- Wexler, Paul (1987). Explorations in Judeo-Slavic Linguistics. Contributions to the sociology of Jewish languages. Vol. 2. Brill Archive. ISBN 978-90-04-07656-3 – via Google Books.
- Wexler, Paul (1996). The non-Jewish origins of the Sephardic Jews. SUNY. ISBN 978-1-4384-2393-7. Archived from the original on 17 November 2023 – via Google Books.
- Wexler, Paul (2002). Two-Tiered Relexification in Yiddish: Jews, Sorbs, Khazars and the Kiev-Polessian Dialect. Trends in linguistics / Studies and monographs: Studies and monographs. Vol. 136. Walter de Gruyter. ISBN 978-3-11-017258-4. Archived from the original on 17 November 2023 – via Google Books.
- Wexler, Paul (2007). "Yiddish Evidence for the Khazar Component in the Ashkenazic ethnogenesis". In Golden, Peter B.; Ben-Shammai, Haggai; Róna-Tas, András (eds.). The World of the Khazars: New Perspectives. Handbuch der Orientalistik: Handbook of Uralic studies. Vol. 17. Brill. pp. 387–398. ISBN 978-90-04-16042-2. Archived from the original on 17 November 2023 – via Google Books.
- Whittow, David (1996). The Making of Byzantium, 600–1025. University of California Press. ISBN 978-0-520-20496-6 – via Google Books.
- Xin, Tangshu. New Book of Tang (in Chinese). Vol. 217a Huihe. Archived from the original on 4 May 2019.
- Zhivkov, Boris (2015). Khazaria in the Ninth and Tenth Centuries. BRILL. ISBN 978-9-004-29448-6 – via Google Books.
- Zimonyi, István (1990). Szõnyi-Sándor, Klára (ed.). The Origins of the Volga Bulghars. Studia Uralo-Altaica, 32. ISBN 978-963-481-839-7.
- Zuckerman, Constantine (1995). "On the date of the Khazars' Conversion to Judaism and the Chronology of the Kings of the Rus' Oleg and Igor". Revue des études byzantines. 53: 237–270. doi:10.3406/rebyz.1995.1906. Archived from the original on 29 November 2022.
- Zuckerman, Constantine (2007). "The Khazars and Byzantium –The First Encounter". In Golden, Peter B.; Ben-Shammai, Haggai; Róna-Tas, András (eds.). The World of the Khazars: New Perspectives. Handbuch der Orientalistik: Handbook of Uralic studies. Vol. 17. Brill. pp. 399–431. ISBN 978-90-04-16042-2 – via Google Books.
- "КАСПИЙСКОЕ МОРЕ перевод [CASPIAN SEA translation]". Русско-крымскотатарский словарь (кириллица) [Russian-Crimean Tatar Dictionary (Cyrillic)] (in Russian). Archived from the original on 26 October 2021.
- "Ясно-понятно. Кто такие мишари?" [Clearly understood: Who are the Mishars?]. Инде (inde.io) (in Russian). 2016. Archived from the original on 8 November 2022.
