= Sorbs (tribe) =

Early Slavic tribe

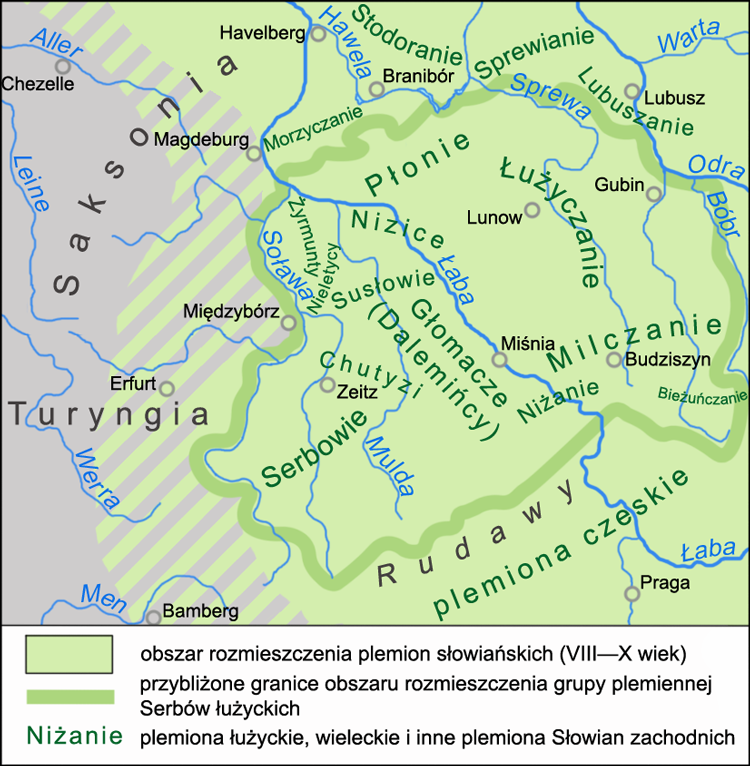
Sorbian tribes in the Early Middle Ages

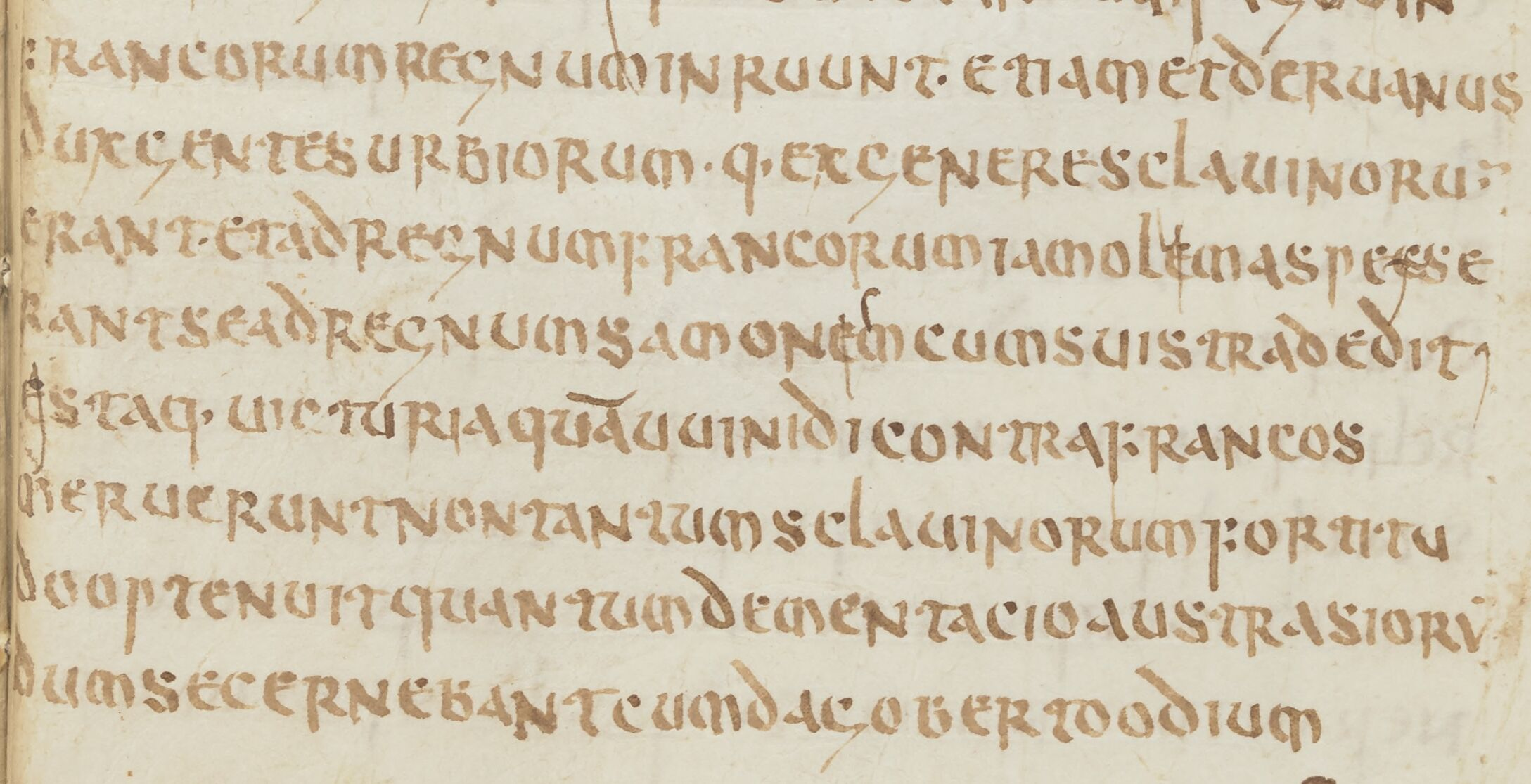
The first mention of Sorbs in the Chronicle of Fredegar, under 631

The Sorbs or Sorabi or Surbi were a medieval Early Slavic tribe, who settled between Saale and Elbe, and as a tribal confederation a region encompassing much of present-day Saxony and Thuringia. They were part of a larger group called Polabian Slavs. (Note: Some assumed subgroups of the Sorbs include the Glomatians, Milceni, and Nisans, among others.)

Their history has been transmitted mainly via Frankish medieval chronicles, beginning with the Chronicle of Fredegar. Said chronicle reports that in 631 under their first named ruler, Dervan, the Sorbs relinquished fealty to the Frankish king and joined a wider Slavic tribal polity led by Samo. It is commonly believed that they are related to the so-called White Serbs and their 7th-century migration to the Balkans, mentioned in the Constantine VII's De Administrando Imperio (10th century), being ancestors of the Serbs.

The Sorbs were consequently mentioned by 8th–10th century chroniclers mainly in relation to border conflicts with neighboring populations. (Note: Such Miliduch's war in 806 and Czimislav's war in 839 against the Carolingian Empire.) The tribe first accepted the suzerainty of the Carolingian Empire under Tunglo in 826. By the middle of the 9th century, an imperial frontier district known as the Sorbian March had been established by the Carolingians.

Despite prolonged resistance, Sorbian territories were gradually integrated into the administrative system of the Holy Roman Empire. An expansionary process which occurred through the further establishment and expansion of additional marches and which had been concluded fully by the 12th century. The region subject to this process—and much of its population—was Germanized during the Ostsiedlung. Populations which maintained their Slavic identity and use of local Slavic languages came to constitute the contemporary Sorbs of Lusatia.

== Etymology ==
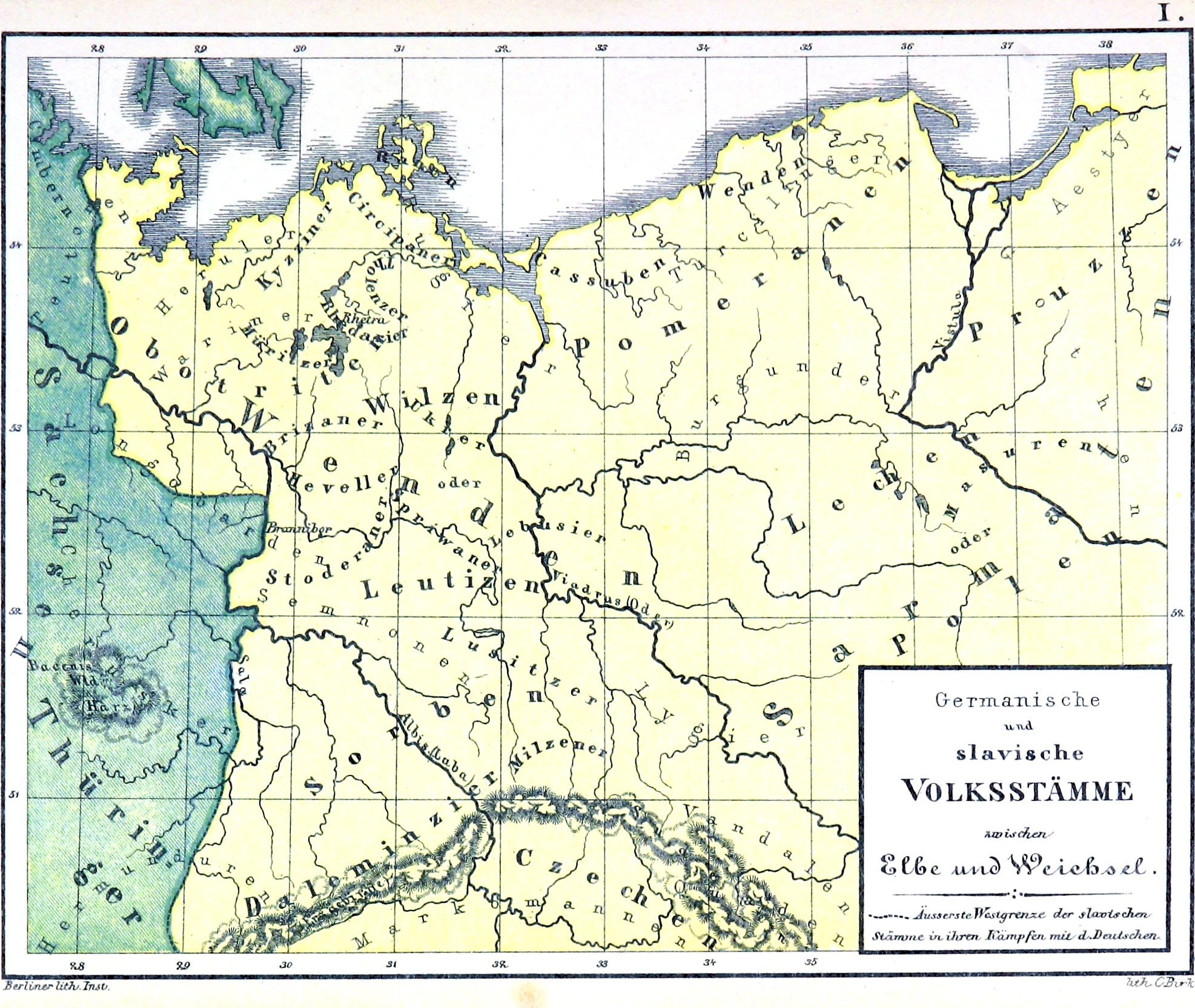
Sorbs and their sub-tribes, Luzici, Milceni and Daleminci, seen in the southwest corner of the early West Slavic tribal area, by W. Fix, 1869

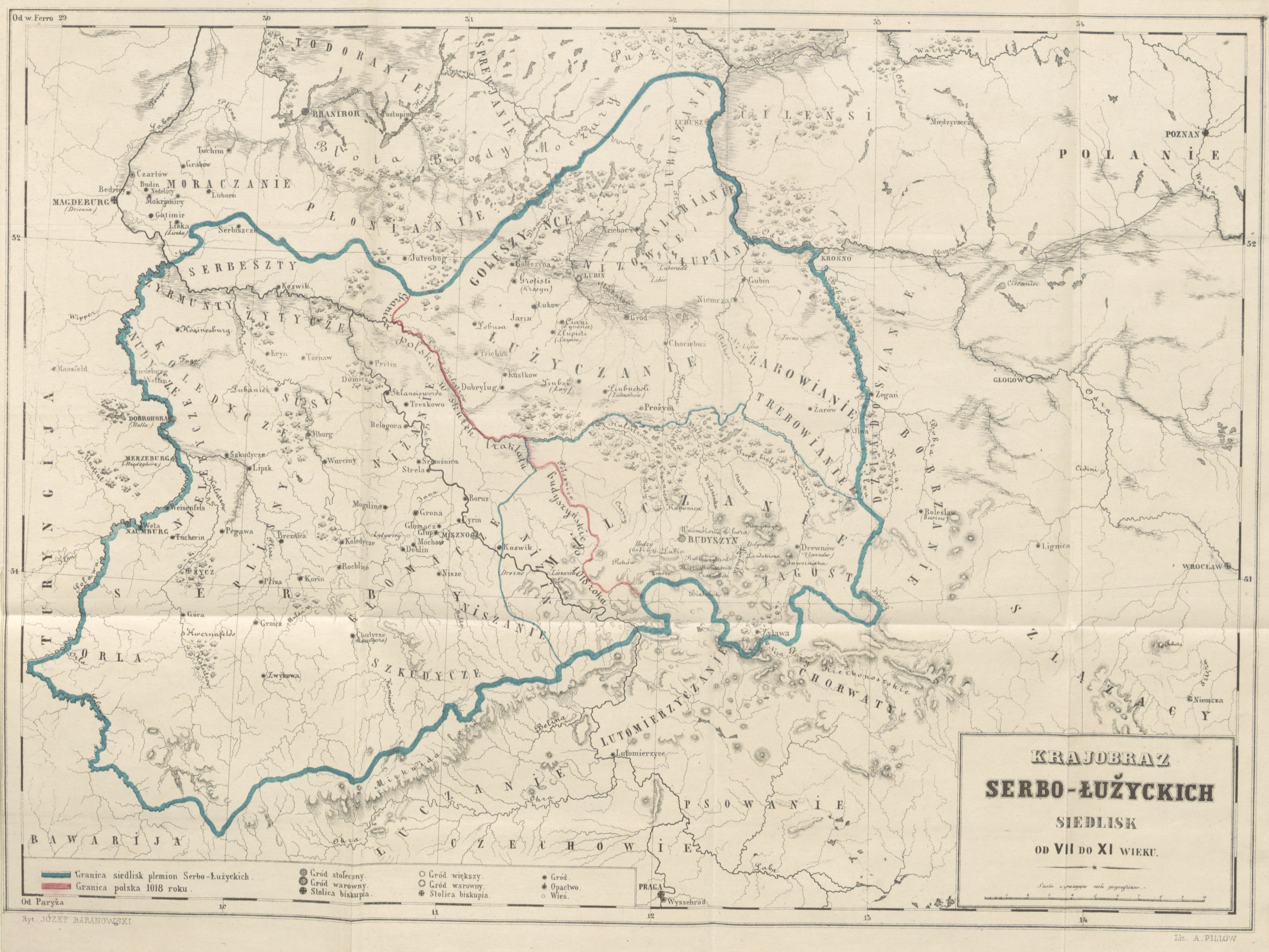
Sorbian tribes between the 7th and 11th century, by Wilhelm Bogusławski, 1861

Early Sorbs are mentioned between the 6th and 10th century as Cervetiis (Servetiis), gentis (S)urbiorum, Suurbi, Sorabi, Soraborum, Sorabos, Surpe, Sorabici, Sorabiet, Sarbin, Swrbjn, Servians, Zribia, and Suurbelant. It is generally considered that their ethnonym *Sŕbъ (plur. *Sŕby) originates from Proto-Slavic language with an appellative meaning of a "family kinship" and "alliance", while other argue a derivation from Iranian-Sarmatian language.

== History ==
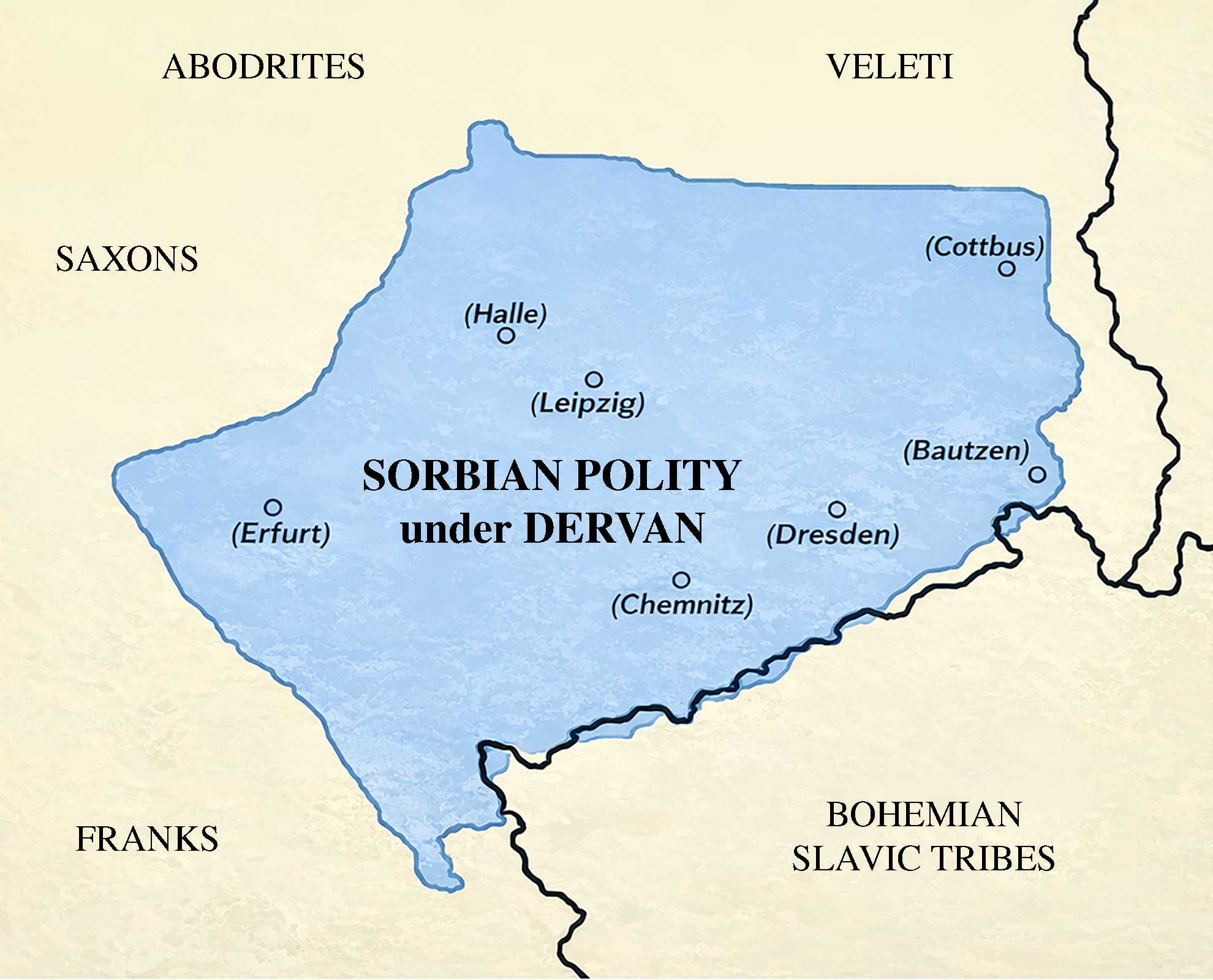
Dervan's Sorbian polity

=== Origin ===
According to the old theorization by Joachim Herrmann, the Serbian tribe characterized by Rüssen-type of Leipzig group pottery arrived from the Middle Danube in the beginning of the 7th century and settled between Saale and Elbe river, but only since the 10th century their ethnonym was transferred to the Luzici, Milceni and other tribes of Sukow-Dziedzice and Tornow group who supposedly were present from the late 5th and early 6th century (Tornow since the 7th century, as was also argued that to the West were present some Slavs with Prague-Korchak culture). Herrmann also considered that the Sorbs settled and influenced around Magdeburg, Havelland, Thuringia and northeast Bavaria, and alongside them immigrated Croats and Bulgars from Middle Danube escaping the pressure of Pannonian Avars. However, since the 1980s, Herrmann's theory about waves of several archaeological cultures carried by distinctive ethnic groups is outdated and rejected by archaeologists, historians and other scholars because it was found to be completely unfounded and based on wrong data and chronologies among others. Pottery of similar quality to the Rüssen-type in the rest of Polabia appears only since the second half of the 8th century. Dendrochronology also showed that the wooden building material was from the late 8th to the beginning of the 10th century, while the material from the 6th and 7th century is almost non-existent. This is also doubting the accuracy of the historical sources and their interpretation. Peter Heather, in conclusion, stated that it is an "old theory" with seriously erroneous dating of the ceramics and sites, which in reality date to the 8th and 9th century. The archaeological data and historical sources indicate earliest Slavic migration along the Carpathians and the Alps since the late 6th century with Korchak-type material, and "the Serbs, most likely, were already carriers of ceramics of the Prague-Korchak type". Heinz Schuster-Šewc deemd as "unfounded" the idea that the Luzici and Milceni did not ethnically belong to the same group as the Sorbs living west of the Elbe river and adopted the Sorbian ethonym since the 10-11th century.

According to some researchers the archaeological data cannot confirm the thesis about a single proto-linguistic group yet supports the claim about two separated ethno-cultural groups with different ancestries whose respective territories correspond to Tornow-type ceramics (Lower Sorbian language) and Leipzig-type ceramics (Upper Sorbian language). Upper Sorbian is more similar to Czech, Slovak and Ukrainian, while Lower Sorbian to Lechitic dialects, with Schuster-Šewc arguing a migration from northeastern Bohemia to Lusatia. However, linguistic research does see a loose connection between Sorbian languages (specifically Upper Sorbian language) and South Slavic languages, particularly the Late Common Slavic *-nū->-nq- // -ny->-ni- verb suffix which is also present in Polabian language dialect, Cieszyn Silesian dialect, and Western South Slavic languages (most of Slovenian dialects and Western part of Serbo-Croatian dialects including Kajkavian, Čakavian, Western Štokavian) which could indicate a northward migration from the south or pointing to a single common area of Slavic pre-migratory period. However, it could be also an in situ development and analogies unrelated to historical migrations. Aleksandar Loma considered that the supposed South Slavic linguistic connection actually "implies that before the 7th century the ancestors of Sorbs came from the east of the Slavic territory to their later homeland, where they subsequently mingled with the West-Slavs. Thus, if the southern Serbs stem from the west and the western from the east, we have a good reason to assume existence of a former East-Slavic tribe under the same name", and that "any further refutation of their ethnogenetic connection by the diversity of their [Sorbian and Serbian] dialects becomes pointless".

It is considered that the ancient homeland of the Sorbs probably was near other Slavs somewhere in Southeastern Poland and Western Ukraine, from where migrated westward along the Carpathians to Silesia, Bohemia and eventually Saxony. The appearance of the Slavs in Polabia is usually interpreted as a migration with or without Avar influence (either independent arrival with or without Avar pressure, or under decision by the Avars as anti-Frankish border guards, or under patronage of the Franks as anti-Avar border guards in Thuringia). However, as the Sorbs probably were present around Bohemia already by the mid-6th century, it excludes their relation with first two Frankish-Avar conflicts (562, 566), and Avars in general, and supports the initiative of the Franks.

The original settlement area of the tribe of Sorbs was between Saale and Elbe river valleys and the Ore Mountains, possibly also expanding to the Lower Havel river in the north, and from the Ilm and Saale in the southwest in Thuringia to the Gera river and city of Erfurt. Based on historical and archaeological evidence, they most probably arrived there from North(-western) Bohemia being part of same ethnocultural area alongside Bohemian tribes of Pšované, Litoměřici, Lemuzi and Děčané. According to a fringe theory their area of settlement possibly also included part of Chebsko (the northwestern edge of the Czech Republic), but it is a baseless claim without a source, and scholars, including E. Simek proved only Czechs lived there. Henryk Łowmiański concluded that there's no mention of Sorbs/Serbs living in the territory of Bohemia in Czech and German historical sources. The area of White Serbs in the Saale-Elbe valley had flat-graves with cremations in urns, while the area of Upper Lusatia and partly Lower Lusatia also had kurgan cremation burials, which was more common in neighboring area of Northeastern Bohemia and Lower Silesia (inhabited by White Croats and Polish tribes), assumed by Rostyslav Vatseba as an indication of a Lechitic-Croatian contact zone in the eastern part of Saxony.

It is often considered that the earliest mention of the Sorbs is from the 6th century or earlier by Vibius Sequester, who recorded Cervetiis (Servetiis) living on the other part of the river Elbe which divided them from the Suevi (Albis Germaniae Suevos a Cerveciis dividiit). According to one theory, the original Serbs were not of Slavic origin and such an early mention is related to possible westward migration of a Sarmatian tribe of Serboi with the Huns who later as an elite subjugated Slavic population giving it their name, and that those who remained in the Caucasus region, were mentioned by Constantine VII in De Ceremoniis as Sarban (Serbs) and Krevatades (Croats). According to Lubor Niederle, that Serbian district in Polabia was located somewhere between Magdeburg and Lusatia, and was later mentioned by the Ottonians as Ciervisti, Zerbisti, and Kirvisti.

=== 7th century ===
According to the Chronicle of Fredegar, the Surbi lived in the Saale-Elbe valley, having settled in the Thuringian part of Francia at least since the second-half of the 6th century and were vassals of Merovingian dynasty. The Saale-Elbe line marked the approximate limit of Slavic westward migration. It is described that they since long time ago were "attached" or "belonged" to the Frankish kingdom, which would be possible at the latest in the interval of Theudebert II's of Austrasia (595–612), probably helping the Franks in the conquest of Thuringia and later siding with Theudebert II during princely rebellion of Theuderic II.

Fredegar recounts that under the leadership of dux (duke) Dervan (Dervanus dux gente Surbiorum que ex genere Sclavinorum), they joined the Slavic tribal union of Samo, after Samo's decisive victory against Frankish King Dagobert I in 631. Afterwards, these Slavic tribes continuously raided Thuringia. The fate of the tribes during and Samo's death and dissolution of the union in 658 is undetermined, but it is considered that subsequently returned to Frankish vassalage, under semi-independent Radulf, King of Thuringia (632–642) until around 700 AD.

=== 8th century ===
In 782, the Sorbs, inhabiting the region between the Elbe and Saale, plundered Thuringia and Saxony. Charlemagne sent Adalgis, Worad and Geilo into Saxony, aimed at attacking the Sorbs, however, they met with rebel Saxons who destroyed them.

In 789, Charlemagne launched a campaign against the Wiltzi; after reaching the Elbe, he went further and successfully "subjected the Slavs". His army also included the Sorbs and Obotrites led by chieftain Witzan. The army reached Dragovit of the Wiltzi, who surrendered, followed by other Slavic magnates and chieftains who submitted to Charlemagne.

=== 9th century ===
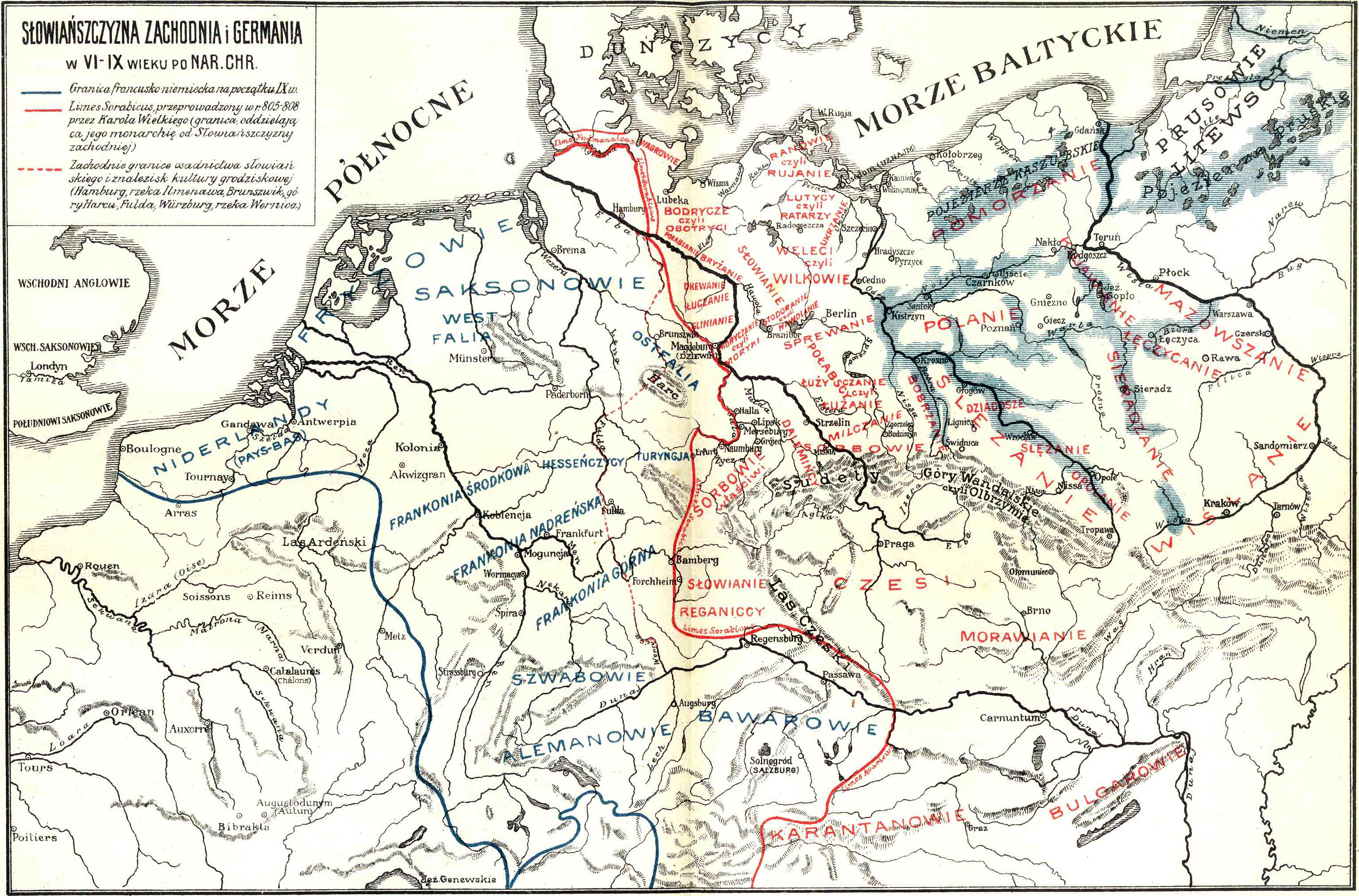
Map of the Sorbian March, by Włodzimierz Dzwonkowski, 1918

Charles the Younger launched a campaign against the Slavs in Bohemia in 805, killing their dux, Lecho, and then proceeded crossing the Saale with his army and killed rex (king) Melito (or "Miliduoch") of the Sorabi or Siurbis who "live on the River Elbe" in 806. The region was laid to waste, upon which the other Slavic chieftains submitted and gave hostages. Franks constructed two castles, one on each river. Ten years later, in 816 the Sorbs rebelled, but their disobedience was suppressed after Saxons and East Franks campaign conquering their cities, and renewing their oaths of submission. In 822, the Sorbs sent an embassy with gifts alongside other Slavs (Obodrites, Wilzi, Bohemians, Moravians, Praedenecenti as well as Pannonian Avars) to a Louis the Pious's general assembly at Frankfurt.

In May 826, at a meeting at Ingelheim, Cedrag of the Obotrites and Tunglo "one of the magnates" of the Sorbs were accused of malpractices; they were ordered to appear in October, and Tunglo surrendered his son as hostage to be allowed to return home. The Franks had, sometime before the 830s, established the Sorbian March, comprising eastern Thuringia, in easternmost East Francia.

In 839, the Saxons fought "the Sorabos, called Colodici" at Kesigesburch and won the battle, managing to kill their king Cimusclo (or "Czimislav"), with Kesigesburch and eleven forts being captured. The Sorbs were forced to pay tribute and forfeited territory to the Franks. The Sorbian tribe of Colodici was furthermore mentioned in 973 (Coledizi pagus, Cholidici), in 975 (Colidiki), and 1015 (Colidici locus). Besides Colodici other tribes which scholars consider part of the core Sorbian tribes were Glomacze-Daleminzi, Chutici-Chudzicy, Citici-Żytyce, Neletici-Nieletycy, Siusler-Susłowie among others.

According to the Annales Fuldenses, in 849 Thachulf, Duke of Thuringia held also the title "dux of the Sorbian March", In 851, the Sorbs attacked and raided Frankish border, provoking Louis the German's invasion which "oppressed them severely. He tamed them, after they had lost their harvests and so the hope of food". In August 856 the Sorbian duces joined king Louis's army in his successful attack on Daleminzi and Duchy of Bohemia. In 857, the brother of Sclavitag/Slavitach son of rebellious Wiztrach dux of Bohemians, found a refuge at the court of Zistibor of Sorbs before was made new dux of Bohemians by the Franks. For summer 858, Thachulf was ordered to attack the Sorbs, as one of three armies dealing with different Slavic frontiers. It is unclear whether by then, or later in the year, Sorbs killed their dux Zistibor. In 869, Sorbs (as a tribe, not confederation) and Siusli (another Sorbic tribe) "joined with the Bohemians and the other peoples of the region and crossed the old Thuringian border: they laid many places waste and killed some who rashly came together to attack them". In August of the same year, many Sorbs and Bohemian mercenaries recruited by the Sorbs, were killed and forced to return home or surrender by Louis the Younger, Thuringian and Saxon forces. After death of Thachulf in August 873, the Sorbs and Siusli rebelled again, but Liutbert (archbishop of Mainz) and new Sorbian March dux Radulf II in January 874 "by pillaging and burning crushed their insolence without battle and reduced them to their former servility". After the Viking raids in the Rhineland against the Saxons in 880, joint forces of the Sorbs, Daleminzi, Bohemians and other near tribes attacked the Slavs around Saale river "faithful to the Thuringians with plunder and burning. Count Poppo, dux of the Sorbian march, came against them with the Thuringians, and with God's help so defeated them that not one out of a great multitude remained". The Sorbs in Saxony probably were the Slavs who successfully repelled and killed Arn (bishop of Würzburg) in 892.

It is considered that somewhere in the second-half of the 9th century, Svatopluk I of Moravia (r. 871–894) may have incorporated the Sorbs into Great Moravia, or spread Moravian influence in the region, because Annales Fuldenses mentions an oath of fidelity mission with gifts by Sorbs in Salz and then Bohemians in Regensburg to king Arnulf in 895/897 (with Bohemians calling the Moravians as "enemies" and "oppressors"), while Thietmar of Merseburg in his Chronicon Thietmari speaking about Thuringia wrote that "in the reign of the Duke Svatopluk we were ruled by Bohemian princes. Our ancestors paid him an annual tribute and he had bishops in his country, then called Marierun [Moravia]".

The mid-9th century Bavarian Geographer mentioned the Surbi having 50 civitates (Iuxta illos est regio, que vocatur Surbi, in qua regione plures sunt, que habent civitates L). Alfred the Great in his Geography of Europe (888–893) relying on Orosius, recorded that "north of the Dalamensians are the Surpe/Servians".

=== 10th century ===
King Henry the Fowler had subjected the Stodorani in 928, and in the following year imposed overlordship on the Obotrites and Veletians, and strengthened the grip on the Sorbs and Glomacze.

Between 932 and 963 the Sorbs were gradually losing their independence, pressured by count Gero, king Otto's margrave of the East (Latin: Gero Orientalium marchio), who expanded German rule into the lands of Polabian Slavs. Since the 940s, several Burgwards were built in the territory of the Sorbs, and the Margravate of Meissen and March of Lusatia were established after 965, within the Holy Roman Empire, with Otto I founding new bishoprics in Slavic regions (including Bishopric of Merseburg). Bishop Boso of St. Emmeram (d. 970), a Slavic-speaker, had considerable success in Christianizing the Sorbs. Although by 994 some Slavic people managed to get independence, only Sorbs remained under Saxon control.

Newer scholarly analyses of primary sources have shown that copies of some charters that contain data on foundation of dioceses in Slavic regions and Gero's jurisdiction over those territories should be considered as interpolated or forged, thus leading modern researchers to question or reject various traditional views regarding the nature and effective scope of German expansion towards those Slavic lands in the middle of the 10th century.

The Arab historians and geographers Al-Masudi and Al-Bakri (10th and 11th century) writing on the Saqaliba mentioned the Sarbin or Sernin living between the Germans and the Moravians, a "Slavic people much feared for reasons that it would take too long to explain and whose deeds would need much too detailed an account. They have no particular religious affiliation". They, like other Slavs, "have the custom of burning themselves alive when a king or chieftain dies. They also immolate his horses". In the Hebrew book Josippon (10th century) are listed four Slavic ethnic names from Venice to Saxony; Mwr.wh (Moravians), Krw.tj (Croats), Swrbjn (Sorbs), Lwcnj (Lučané or Lusatians).

=== Aftermath ===
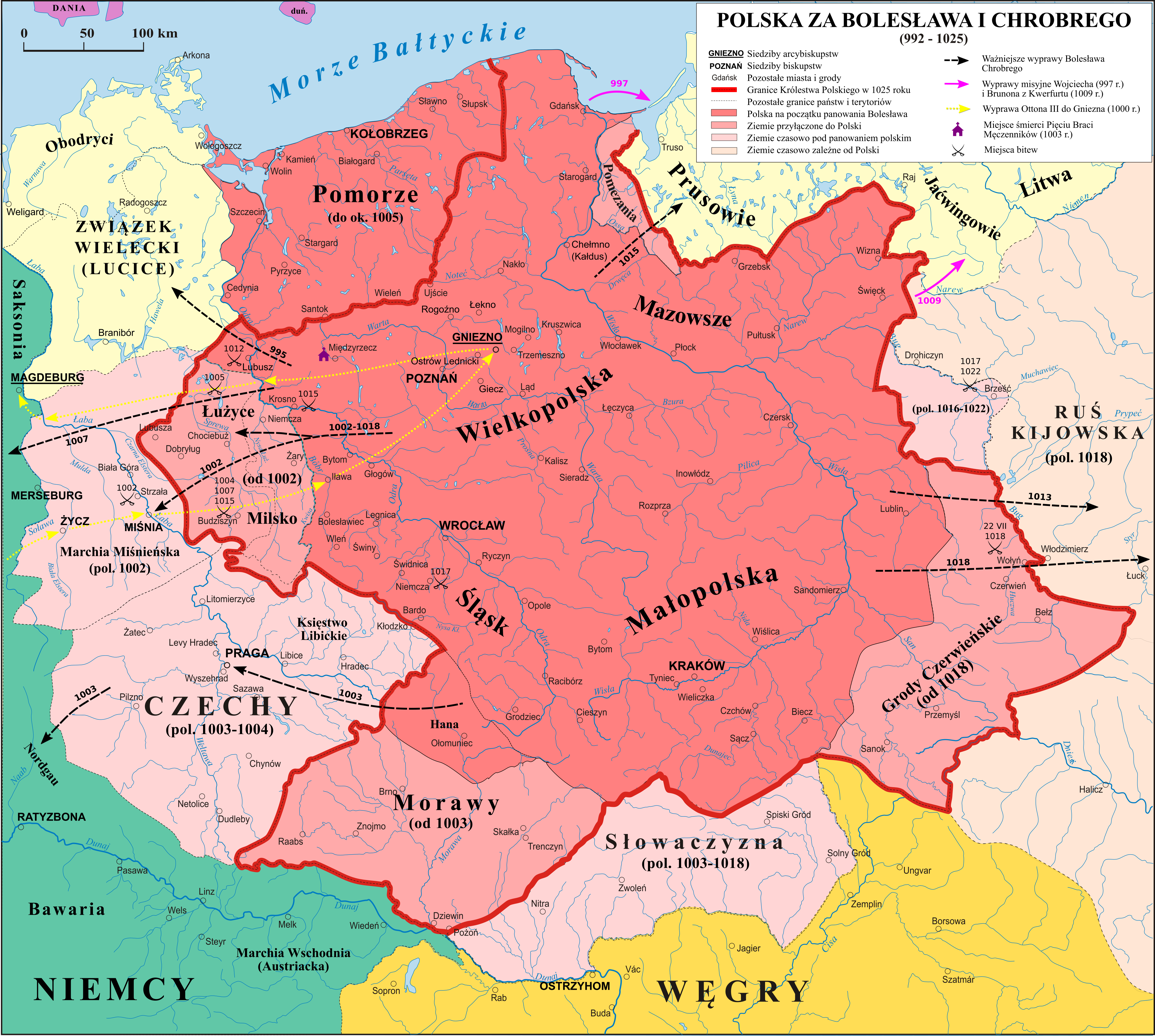
Sorbian and other neighboring Slavic regions in German-Polish conflicts at the beginning of the 11th century

In the spring of 1002, German marches in Sorbian lands were temporarily overrun by the Polish duke Bolesław I the Brave, who seized all regions up to the river Elbe, capturing the town of Bautzen (Upper Sorbian: Budyšin), and also the neighboring city of Meissen (Upper Sorbian: Mišno) with territories towards the west, up to White Elster river. Those Sorbian and other Slavic regions remained contested for several years, since German-Polish relations were marked by a series of recurring conflicts and temporary treaties, that consequently resulted in the gradual restoration of German rule over Sorbian lands.

Cosmas of Prague in his 12th century Chronica Boemorum, speaking about mythical history of Czechs, mentions certain tutor Duringo of Sribia genere and as scelestus Zribin. The chronicle, dealing with real historical events, mentions land of Serbia (Zribiam 1040, 1087, 1088, 1095, 1109, and Sribiae 1113), mainly in regard of being crossed by Saxons to attack Bohemia, or local castles being attacked by Bohemia, from there moved regional princes to Poland and back, or as a land where were banished people from Bohemia. In an 1140 royal charter to the lands east of river Saale were referred as Zurba.

Since then the Sorbian tribes mostly disappeared from the political scene. From the 11th to the 15th century, agriculture east of Elbe River developed and colonization by Frankish, Flemish and Saxon settlers intensified. The Slavs were allowed to live mainly in the periphery of the cities, and the military-administrative as well as religious authority was in the hands of the Germans. Despite the long process of Germanization, part of the Slavs living in Lusatia preserved their identity and language until now, and in the early 20th century there lived some 150 thousand Lusatian Sorbs.

== Organization ==
According to Rostyslav Vatseba, "between the Elbe and Saale rivers the heterachical dryht-type state existed during the reign of Miliduch (before 806). The local society of the White Serbs was of clan character, which indicates the beginnings of state formation. The Sorbian 'civitates' are equal to simple chiefdoms, the particular clan regions correspond with complex chiefdoms. The high king ('rex supérbus') had only hegemonic authority over the heads of the clan regions ('ceteri reges'). Later on in the 9th and early 10th century the political unity of the Sorbi region was lost, despite a presumably more hierarchical mode of government in the Colodici's principality of Czimislav (830s). The author suggests that Colodici's 'castellа' served as places of the high prince's dryht members ('witsessen') residence, providing the ability to control the neighbouring clans. Such a system presumably could have persisted to the times of Čestibor". The peasants were called smerdi, while two other classes were vitaz/vitiezi and zhupans.

== Relation to the White Serbs ==
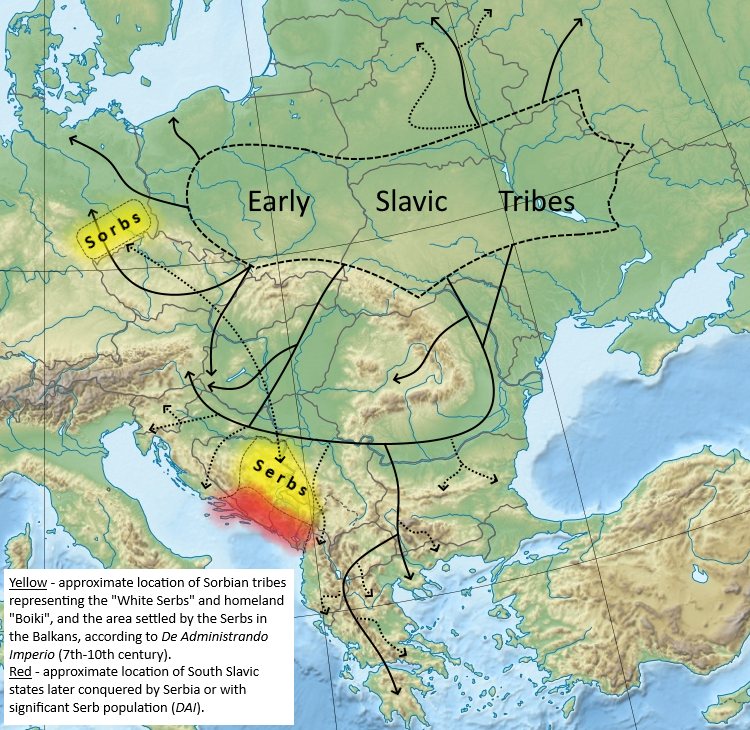
Slavic and Serbian migrations to the Balkans.

In the scholarship, the Polabian Sorbs have often been identified with the White Serbs, mentioned in the 10th-century Byzantine chronicle, known as the De Administrando Imperio, that narrates the migration of Serbs to the Balkans and states their origin from the White Serbs (Greek: ἄσπροι Σέρβλοι), that lived far to the north, in the region that is known is historiography as the White Serbia. Those accounts functions as the foundation-stone narrative of traditional Serbian historiography. This identification derives from the similarities of the Frankish exonym and the Balkan endonym, in addition to the similarities of areas inhabited by the Sorbs with the described northern location in the Byzantine account.

Since the 19th century, De Administrando Imperio, with its White Serbia and its White Croatia narrative, became the foundation-stone narrative of both modern Serbian and Croatian historiography. Based on the similarities in name and location of the lands of the Sorbs of Frankish chronicles and White Serbia of the Byzantine account, those historians who have subscribed to the historicity of De Administrando Imperio's narrative, have often held the two as identical.

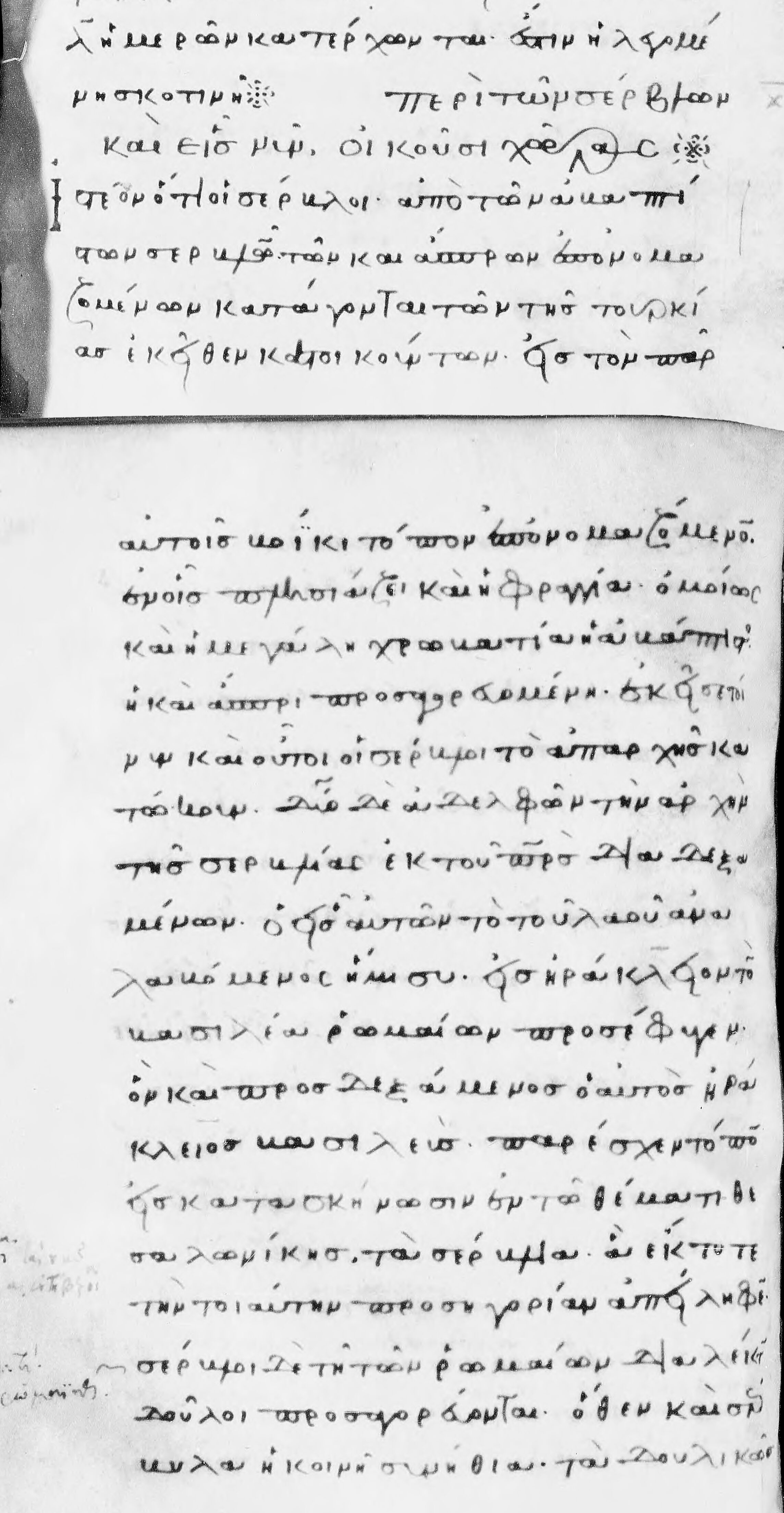
The origins of the Serbs narrated in De Administrando Imperio. From a 12th-century Byzantine manuscript.

Łowmiański argues that the Boiki region (the name used by De Administrando Imperio for the region from whence "unbaptized Serbs called white" migrated), which is commonly scholarly understood as Bohemia, accordingly, in his view the account should be read as meaning "near" as is erroneously stating "in". De Administrando Imperio describes this Boiki region's location as neighboring Francia and being north of Hungary. It also further reports that when two brothers succeeded their father, one of them migrated with half of the people from White Serbia to the Balkans during the rule of Heraclius (610–641). According to traditional historiography, in line with a more general identification of White Serbia as the lands of the Sorbs, the Unknown Archon who led the Serbians to the Balkans is commonly viewed as related to Dervan by historians following this perspective.

In the scholarship is generally considered that they might have arrived as a small military elite which managed to organize other already settled and more numerous Slavs. Francis Dvornik considered that a Sorbian elite migration might have been caused by the Frankish pressure and conquest of Thuringia, and the Byzantine alliance against the Avars. According to him the Sorbs can be viewed as a "typical foederati of the empire" and that their migration might have temporarily diminished Sorbian power on the borders of Francia. However, other scholars like John Van Antwerp Fine Jr. and Georgios Kardaras note that they did not fight the Avars, as there's no evidence or mention of it in historical sources. In Dvornik's account the Sorbs who emigrated to Southeastern Europe arrived as a military and ruling elite, that could not influence "racial and linguistic evolution" of other Southern Slavs and natives, imposing only their name rather than mass migrating an entire people group, in a similar manner to the Bulgar relationship to Bulgarians.

Despite the similarity and common ancestry mentioned in DAI, Frankish chroniclers do not mention the common ancestry of the Sorabi of the Elbe and the Sorabos of Dalmatia, but rather perceived their emissaries as of separate political groups.

== Foreign perception ==
The 10th-century Widukind of Corvey in his The Deeds of the Saxons wrote that the "heathens are bad", but their land is rich for cultivation and harvest. Thietmar of Merseburg in the early 11th century regarded them as pagans. The 12th-century Helmond described the Sorbs of having a "generally innate cruelty", that the pagan people would "tear out the entrails of captured Christians and then wrap them around a stake", while a clergyman stated that the Sorbs and Elbe Slavs are "men without mercy ... rob, murder and kill many with selected tortures".

== Rulers ==
Monarch	Reign
Dervan	c. 615 – 636
Miliduch	c. 790 – 806
Tunglo	c. 826
Czimislav	c. 830 – 840
Čestibor	c. 840 – 859
Slavibor	c. 859 – 894

Other notable people

- Ludmila of Bohemia (c. 860 – 921)
- Albrecht I of Meissen (12th century)

== See also ==
- Origin hypotheses of the Serbs
- Genetic studies on Serbs

== Sources ==
Primary sources

- Chronicle of Fredegar, 642
  - Wallace-Hadrill, John Michael, ed. (1960). The fourth book of the Chronicle of Fredegar with its Continuations. London: Thomas Nelson.
- Royal Frankish Annals, 829
  - Scholz, Bernhard W.; Rogers, Barbara, eds. (1970). Carolingian Chronicles: Royal Frankish Annals and Nithard's Histories. Ann Arbor: University of Michigan Press.
- Annales Bertiniani, 882
  - Nelson, Janet L., ed. (1991). The Annals of St-Bertin. Manchester: Manchester University Press.
- Bavarian Geographer, mid-9th-century
- Annales Fuldenses, 901
  - Reuter, Timothy, ed. (1992). The Annals of Fulda. Manchester: Manchester University Press.
- Widukind's Chronicle, 973
  - Bachrach, Bernard S.; Bachrach, David S., eds. (2014). Widukind of Corvey: Deeds of the Saxons. Washington: The Catholic University of America Press.
- Thietmar's Chronicle, 1018
  - Warner, David A., ed. (2001). Ottonian Germany: The Chronicon of Thietmar of Merseburg. Manchester and New York: Manchester University Press.
- Cosmas's Chronicle, 1125
  - Cosmas of Prague (1923). Bertold Bretholz (ed.). Die Chronik der Böhmen des Cosmas von Prague. Berlin: Weidmannsche Buchhandlung.

Secondary sources

- Andersen, Henning (2025). "The Western South Slavic Contrast Sn. sah-ni-ti I/ SC sah-nu-ti". Slovenski jezik / Slovene Linguistic Studies. 2: 47–62. doi:10.3986/SLS.2.1.03.
- Andersen, Henning (2020). "On the formation of the Common Slavic koiné". New Perspectives on the Early Slavs and the Rise of Slavic: Contact and Migrations (PDF). Heidelberg: Universitätsverlag Winter. pp. 11–42. ISBN 978-3-8253-4707-9.
- Andersen, Henning (2023). "The Slavic Expansion. Streams, Springs, and Wells". Scando-Slavica. 69 (1): 39–87. doi:10.1080/00806765.2023.2188609.
- Bachrach, David S. (2020). "The Eastern Campaigns of King Henry II of Germany, 1003–17". Journal of Medieval Military History. 18: 1–36.
- Barford, Paul M. (2001). The Early Slavs: Culture and Society in Early Medieval Eastern Europe. Cornell University Press. ISBN 9780801439773.
- Sebastian Brather (2001; 2nd ed. 2008). Archäologie der westlichen Slawen: Siedlung, Wirtschaft und Gesellschaft im früh- und hochmittelalterlichen Ostmitteleuropa. Walter de Gruyter. ISBN 9783110206098
- Brather, Sebastian (2004). "The beginnings of Slavic settlement east of the river Elbe". Antiquity. 78 (300): 314–329. doi:10.1017/S0003598X00112980.
- S. Brather (2011). "The Western Slavs of the Seventh to the Eleventh Century – An Archaeological Perspective". History Compass, 9(6), pp. 454–473
- S. Brather (2020). "Germanic or Slavic? Reconstructing the Transition from Late Antiquity to the Early Middle Ages in East Central Europe". Interrogating the “Germanic”, De Gruyter, pp. 211–224, ISBN 9783110699760
- Bury, J.B. (2011). The Cambridge Medieval History Series volumes 1-5. Plantagenet Publishing. GGKEY:G636GD76LW7.
- Dvornik, Francis (1949). The Making of Central and Eastern Europe. London: Polish Research Centre Ltd.
- Dvornik, Francis (1956). The Slavs: Their Early History and Civilization. Boston: American Academy of Arts and Sciences.
- Jenkins, Romilly, ed. (1962). Constantine Porphyrogenitus: De Administrando Imperio, II: Commentary. London: Athlone Press.
- Fine, John Van Antwerp Jr. (1991) [1983]. The Early Medieval Balkans: A Critical Survey from the Sixth to the Late Twelfth Century. Ann Arbor, Michigan: University of Michigan Press. ISBN 0472081497.
- Goetz, Hans-Werner (2015). "Die Slawen in der Wahrnehmung Thietmars von Merseburg zu Beginn des 11. Jahrhunderts" [The Slavs as Perceived by Thietmar von Merseburg at the Beginning of the 11th Century]. Lětopis (in German) (2): 103–118.
- Havlíková, Lubomíra (2016). "What was the location of Serbia mentioned in the Cosmas Chronicle of the Czechs?". In Srđan Rudić (ed.). Spomenica dr Tibora Živkovića: Homage to Tibor Živković. Institute of History Belgrade. pp. 185–191. ISBN 9788677431174.
- Heather, Peter (2010). Empires and Barbarians: The Fall of Rome and the Birth of Europe. Oxford University Press. ISBN 978-0-19-974163-2.
- Hengst, Karlheinz (2016). "Zurba – ein bisher unbeachteter Name für das frühe westliche Sorbenland" [Zurba – A Previously Unnoticed Name for the Early Western Sorbian Area]. Lětopis (in German) (2): 21–31.
- Herrmann, Joachim, ed. (1985) [1970]. Die Slawen in Deutschland: Geschichte und Kultur der slawischen Stämme westlich von Oder und Neisse vom 6. bis 12. Jahrhundert (in German). Berlin: Akademie-Verlag GmbH.
- Kostić, Zorica (2022). "Досељавање словенских племена у Полабље и на Балкан" [Settling of Slavic tribes in the Elbe valley and the Balkans]. Journal of the Serbian Archaeological Society (in Serbian). 38: 99–123. doi:10.18485/gsad.2022.38.4.
- Kostić, Zorica (2023). "Осврт на нека језичка сведочанства о досељавању словенских племена на југ" [An overview of some linguistic testimonies on the settlement of Slavic tribes in the south]. Journal of the Serbian Archaeological Society (in Serbian). 39: 113–141. doi:10.18485/gsad.2023.39.6.
- Kunstmann, Heinrich (1987). Beiträge zur Geschichte der Besiedlung Nord- und Mitteldeutschlands mit Balkanslaven. Peter Lang Gmbh, Internationaler Verlag Der Wissenschaften. ISBN 9783876903859.
- Loma, Aleksandar (1993). "Неки славистички аспекти српске етногенезе" [Some Linguistic Aspects of the Serb Ethnogenesis]. Zbornik Matice srpske za slavistiku (in Serbian). Novi Sad: 105–126.
- Pech, Edmund (2015). "Milzener, Lusizer und Glomaci-Daleminzer Kontroversen zur frühen Geschichte der Sorben" [Milceni, Luzici and Glomaci-Daleminci. Controversies concerning the early History of the Sorbs]. LĚTOPIS. Zeitschrift für sorbische Sprache, Geschichte und Kultur. Časopis za rěč, stawizny a kulturu Łužiskich Serbow (2): 119–132.
- Roslund, Mats (2007). Guests in the House: Cultural Transmission between Slavs and Scandinavians 900 to 1300 AD. BRILL. ISBN 9789047421856.
- Reuter, Timothy (2013) [1991]. Germany in the Early Middle Ages c. 800–1056. London and New York: Routledge.
- Riché, Pierre (1993). The Carolingians: A Family Who Forged Europe. Philadelphia: University of Pennsylvania Press.
- Schallert, Joseph (2024). "Dialectal Fragmentation". In Danko Šipka, Wayles Browne (ed.). The Cambridge Handbook of Slavic Linguistics. Cambridge University Press. pp. 595–65. doi:10.1017/9781108973021.029. ISBN 978-1-108-83267-0.
- Stieldorf, Andrea (2026) [2012]. Marken und Markgrafen: Studien zur Grenzsicherung durch die fränkisch-deutschen Herrscher (2nd ed.). Wiesbaden: Harrassowitz Verlag.
- Stone, Gerald (2016). Slav Outposts in Central European History: The Wends, Sorbs and Kashubs. London and New York: Bloomsbury Academic.
- Vatseba, Rostyslav (2018a). "The political system of Sorbian Principalities between the Elbe and Saale Rivers in the 9th and early 10th century". Problems of Slavonic Studies (in Ukrainian). 67: 81–103. doi:10.30970/sls.2018.67.
- Vatseba, Rostyslav (2018b). "The 7th–9th century ethnocultural structure of Slavic Polabya & the influence of borderlands on state formation processes". Zaporizhzhia Historical Review & Scholarly Works of the Faculty of History, Zaporizhzhia National University. 1 (51): 383–395. doi:10.26661/swfh-2018-51-047. ISSN 2076-8982.
- Vatseba, Rostyslav (2018c), "Розселення племен Слов'янського Полаб'я у VIII–X ст." [Geographical distribution of Polabian Slavonic tribes in the 8th-10th centuries], Записки Наукового товариства імені Шевченка (in Ukrainian), CCLXXI: 603–624
- Vatseba, Rostyslav (2018d). "Zagadnienie struktury etnicznej i politycznej południowego Połabia w końcu VI — pierwszej ćwierci X wieku" [The Issue of Ethnic & Political Structure of Southern Polabya at the End of the 6th - in the First Quarter of the 10th Century]. Średniowiecze Polskie i Powszechne (in Ukrainian). Vol. 10. pp. 13–35. ISSN 2080-492X.
- Vatseba, Rostyslav (2019). "Towards the issue of the White Croats participation in the Upper Sorbs ethnogenesis". Ukrajina i Hrvatska: povijesne paralele. Radovi Drugog međunarodnog hrvatsko-ukrajinskog znanstvenog skupa, 1–3. lipanj 2017 (in Ukrainian). Etnološko društvo Bojky & Sveučilište u Zagrebu. pp. 127–151. ISBN 978-617-7624-66-9.
- Vatseba, Rostyslav (2022). "Виникнення Білої Сербії у світлі тюринзької політики Меровінгів" [The Rise of the White Serbia in the Light of the Merovingians' Thuringia Policy]. Problems of World History (in Ukrainian). 1 (17): 42–84. doi:10.46869/2707-6776-2022-17-2.
- Vatseba, Rostyslav (2023). "Каролінзька політика стосовно білих сербів наприкінці VIII та в IX столітті" [The Carolingian Policy towards the White Serbs in the late VIIIth and the IXth Century]. Problems of World History (in Ukrainian). 1 (21): 19–63. doi:10.46869/2707-6776-2023-21-2.
- Vlasto, A. P. (1970). The Entry of the Slavs Into Christendom: An Introduction to the Medieval History of the Slavs. CUP Archive. pp. 142–147. ISBN 978-0-521-07459-9.
- Verbruggen, J. F. (1997). The Art of Warfare in Western Europe During the Middle Ages: From the Eighth Century to 1340. Boydell & Brewer. ISBN 978-0-85115-570-8.
- Živković, Tibor (2011). "The Origin of the Royal Frankish Annalist's Information about the Serbs in Dalmatia". Homage to Academician Sima Ćirković. Belgrade: The Institute for History. pp. 381–398.
- Živković, Tibor (2012a). De conversione Croatorum et Serborum: A Lost Source. Belgrade: The Institute of History.
