= Samo =

Unifier of Slavic tribes (c. 600–c. 658)

- Rex Sclavorum ("King of the Slavs")
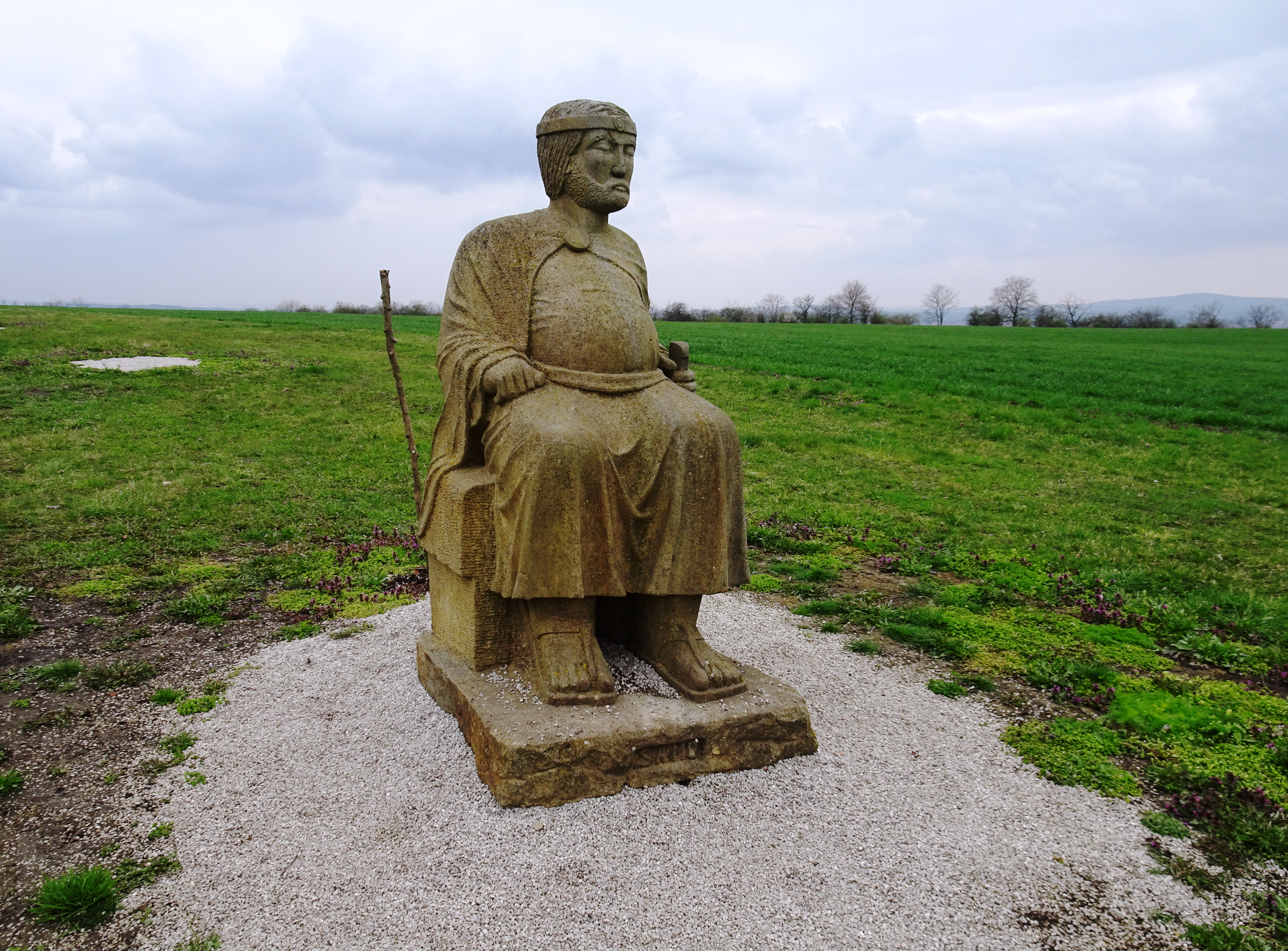
- Samo statue at Náklo hill near Dubňany
- Reign: 623–658
- Born: c. 600 "Senonian country" (Senonago), probably modern Soignies or Sens
- Died: c. 658

Samo (c. 600 – c. 658) was the founder and sole ruler of the first recorded unified tribal polity of Slavs, later known as Samo's realm, (Note: Sometimes called a "kingdom") ruling from 623 until his death in 658. According to Fredegar—the earliest source about Samo and the one from which all later ones derive—he was a Frankish merchant from Sens.

Samo initially established his rule by unifying several Slavic tribes against robber raiders from the nearby Avar polity and initiating an uprising against Avar rule. This led to him occupying a position later called "King of the Slavs" (Latin: rex Sclavorum) by the Gesta Dagoberti's reworking (Note: As well as subsequent ones) of Fredegar's account. In 631, Samo successfully led a defense of his tribal polity against the Frankish Kingdom during the three-day Battle of Wogastisburg. The Sorbian ruler Dervan changed his allegiances from the Frankish kingdom to Samo's tribal polity.

Samo has often served as central narrative figure for various forms of Slavic nationalism, (Note: Such as Czech and Slovak nationalism) which commonly disregard the only independent source for his life alleging he was of Frankish origin, (Note: Prominent scholars such as Palacký and Šafařík are notable examples of this tendency.) in favor of accounts based on the Conversio Carantanorum's reworking of Fredegar, which allege Samo was of Slavic origin. The kingly title first recorded in the 9th-century Gesta Dagoberti's reworking of Fredegar's account was not used by his sons.

== Realm ==
Samo's Realm
- 623/631–658
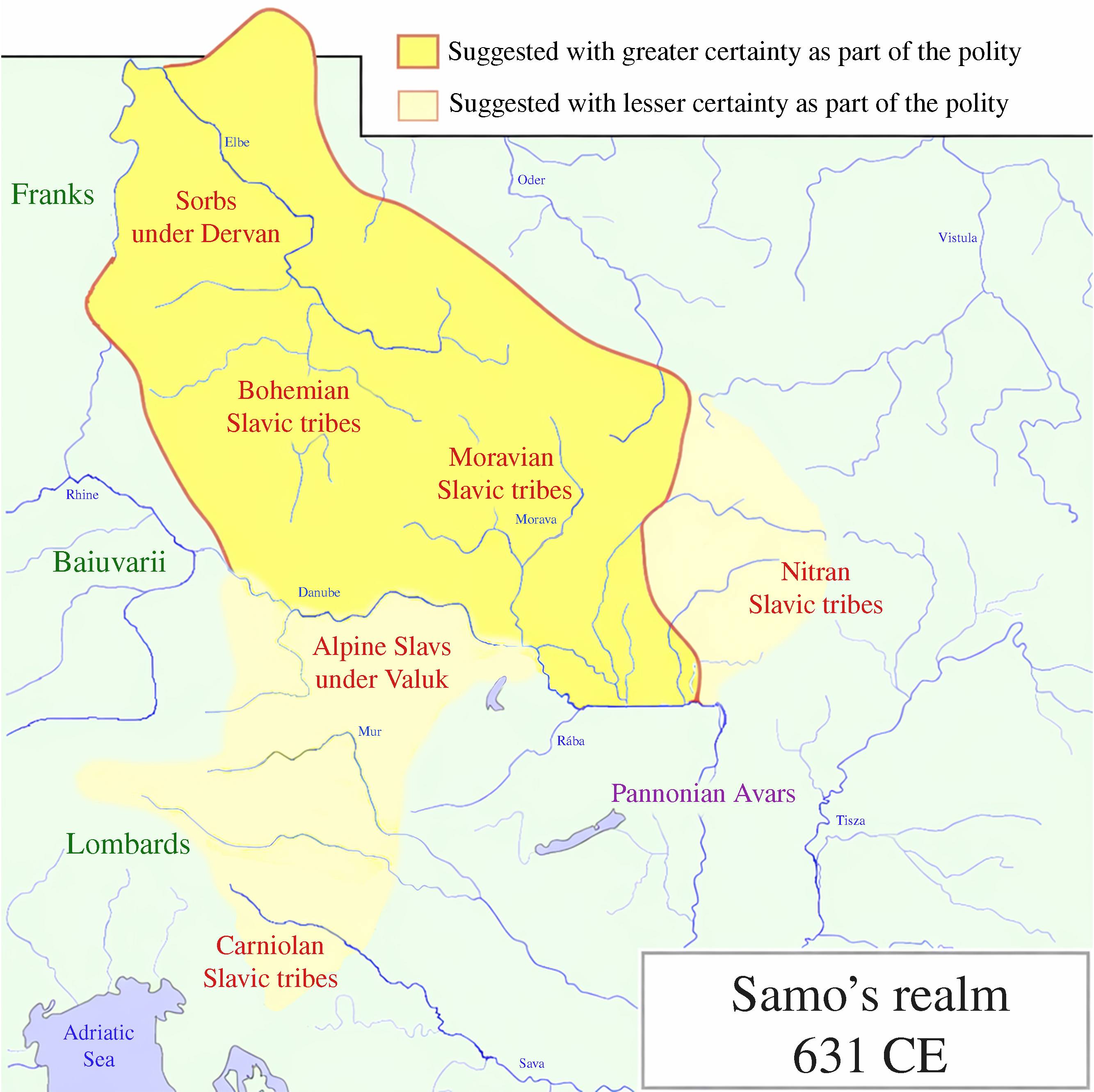
- Borders of the Slavic territories under King Samo's rule in 631
- Capital: Morava, most likely Dowina (present Devín in Slovakia)
- Common languages: Proto-Slavic
- Religion: Slavic polytheism Chalcedonian Christianity (minority, disputed)
- Government: Monarchy
- Historical era: Early Middle Ages
  - Victory against Dagobert I: 623/631
  - Death of King Samo: 658
Preceded by
Francia
Avar Khaganate
Succeeded by
Francia
Carantania
Avar Khaganate
Great Moravia
Principality of Nitra
- Today part of: Czech Republic; Slovakia; Germany; Austria; Poland; Slovenia (Possibly)

Samo's realm existed between 623/631 AD and 658 in Central Europe. The extent of Samo's power before and after 631 is disputed. The centre of the union was most likely in Moravia and Nitravia (Nitra); additionally, the union included Bohemian tribes, proto-Slovak tribes, Sorbs (under Dervan), and other West Slavic tribes along the river Danube (present Lower Austria and Hungary). The polity per se has been called the first Slavic state.

It is generally believed that the tribal union included the regions of Moravia, Nitravia (Nitra), Silesia, Bohemia and Lusatia. According to Julius Bartl, the centre of the polity lay "somewhere in the area of southern Moravia, Lower Austria, and western Slovakia (Nitravia)". It was long disputed, whether Samo's realm contained Carantania, but the unsuccessful missionary efforts of St. Amand, attack of the Lombards in 631 against the Carantanians and Ljudmil Hauptmann's finding that the connection with Samo is also confirmed by the Carantanian tradition, point that Carantania was indeed a part of the realm. On the other hand, according to J. B. Bury, "the assumption that his kingdom embraced Carantania, the country of the Alpine Slavs, rests only upon the Anonymus de conversione Bagariorum et Carantanorum". Archaeological findings indicate that the realm was situated in present-day Moravia, Lower Austria and Slovakia. According to Slovak historian Richard Marsina, it is unlikely that the center of Samo's tribal union was in the whole territory of present-day Slovakia. The settlements of the later Moravian and Nitrian principalities (see: Great Moravia) are often identical with those from the time of Samo's realm.

The core of Samo's state was located north of the Danube, and in the upper Main region. In some historical sources of the early 9th century, this region is described as "regio Sclavorum" or "terra Slavorum". Large amounts of early medieval Slavic ceramics are also found here. Many Slavic toponyms have also been found in this area, such as Winideheim ("The Hill of the Wends"), and Knetzburg ("Prince's Castle").

=== Prelude ===
According to Fredegar, Samo went to the Slavs in c. 623–624. The dating has been questioned on the basis that the Wends would have most likely rebelled after the defeat of the Avars at the First Siege of Constantinople in 626. The Avars first arrived in the Pannonian Basin and subdued the local Slavs in the 560s. Samo may have been one of the merchants who supplied arms to the Slavs for their regular revolts. Whether he became king during a revolt of 623–24 or during the one which inevitably followed the Avar defeat in 626, he definitively took strategic advantage of the latter to solidify his position. A string of victories over the Avars proved his ability to his subjects and secured his election as rex (king). Samo went on to secure his throne by marriage into the major Wendish families, wedding at least twelve women and apparently fathering twenty-two sons and fifteen daughters.

In 630–631, Valuk, the "duke of the Wends" (Wallucus dux Winedorum) was mentioned. These Wends referred to the Slavs of the Windic March, which according to some historians was the later March of Carinthia (Carantania) in present Slovenia and Austria. According to Jan Steinhubel, Valuk allowed Longobards to pass through his territory and attack Samo from south-west. Longobards were allies of Franks (Dagobert I) against Samo. If Valuk allowed Longobards to go through his territory, his principality could have not been part of Samo's realm.

=== History ===
The most famous event of Samo's career was his victory over the Frankish royal army under Dagobert I in 631 or 632. Provoked to action by a "violent quarrel in the Pannonian kingdom of the Avars or Huns", Dagobert led three armies against the Wends, the largest being his own Austrasian army. The Franks were routed near Wogastisburg; the majority of the besieging armies were slaughtered, while the rest of the troops fled, leaving weapons and other equipment lying on the ground. In the aftermath of the Wendish victory, Samo invaded Frankish Thuringia several times and undertook looting raids there. Dervan, the "duke of the Sorbs" (dux gente Surbiorum que ex genere Sclavinorum), initially subordinate to the Franks, joined the Slavic tribal union after Samo defeated Dagobert I. The Sorbs lived to the east of the Saxon Saale. Dervan participated in the subsequent wars against the Franks, successfully fighting against Frankish Thuringia (631–634), until he was finally defeated by Radulf of Thuringia in 636.

In 641, the rebellious Radulf sought an alliance with Samo against his sovereign, Sigebert III. According to Chronicle of Fredegar, the Wendish rebellion against Avars took place in 623/624. This was two years before the Siege of Constantinople by Avars which was supported by Slavs. However, modern researchers reject this version and believe the revolt took place around 626, after Avar failure under the walls of Constantinople which provoked the Slavic revolt, combined with long history of unfriendly Slav-Avar relations.

=== Rebellion ===
Samo's rebellion
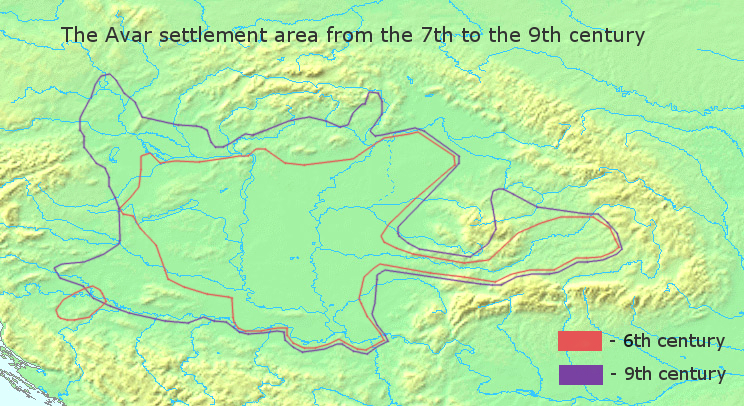
- Avar settlement area in the Carpathian Basin from the 7th to the 9th century by to Éva Garam.
Date	c. 626
Location	Bohemia, Moravia, Slovakia, eastern Austria
Result	Slavic victory
Territorial changes	Establishment of a polity of unified Slavic tribes; Decline of the Avar Khaganate

Belligerents
Slavic tribes	Avar Khaganate

Commanders and leaders
Samo	Bayan III

The revolt is believed to have begun in Moravia. The Slavic rebels were allegedly supported by Franks and Samo was supposedly sent from Francia to ensure Frankish support. The revolt allegedly also been supported by the Byzantine Empire. Samo realised that the rebels lacked a strong leadership, which he used as an opportunity to establish his authority and demonstrate his command skills. Under Samo's leadership, Slavic rebels successfully fought and defeated Avars in multiple engagements. Samo earned respect among the Slavic tribes for his skilled leadership. Samo's victory over Avars in the final engagement secured the success of the rebellion and establishment of his state on the freed Slavic lands.

According to Chronicle of Fredegar, "A great number of the Huns [Avars] were killed by Vinidian [Slavic] swords." during the rebellion. The success of the Slavic uprising caused irrecoverable damage to the Avar Khaganate and Samo was proclaimed Rex Sclavorum ("King of the Slavs") for his outstanding leadership in the uprising.

=== Rule ===
Despite the desire of Franks to establish their control over the recently freed Slavic lands and Samo's connection to the Frankish lands, Samo refused to bring these lands under Frankish control and retained independence of his newly-established state from both the Avar Khaganate and Francia. Samo signed a peace agreement with King Dagobert I to ensure stability for his state. It was believed to have encompassed Bohemia, Moravia, Slovakia, eastern Austria and later White Serbia. However, in 630, the Franks invaded Slavic lands after Samo's refusal to turn in Slavs who engaged in rampant banditry against the Frankish merchants. The conflict cumulated at the Battle of Wogastisburg in 631, which ended in Frankish defeat.

Samo also maintained long-distance trade relationships. On his death, however, his title was not inherited by his sons. Ultimately, Samo can be credited with forging a Wendish identity by speaking on behalf of the community which recognised his authority.

=== Aftermath ===
The history of the tribal union after Samo's death in 658 or 659 is largely unclear, though it is generally assumed that it ended. Archaeological findings show that the Avars returned to their previous territories (at least to southernmost modern Slovakia) and entered into a symbiosis with the Slavs, whereas territories to the north of the Avar Khaganate were purely Slav territories. The first specific thing that is known about the fate of these Slavs and Avars is the existence of Moravian and Nitravian principalities in the late 8th century, which attacked the Avars, and the defeat of the Avars by the Franks under Charlemagne in 799 or 802–03, after which the Avars soon ceased to exist. Great Moravia is viewed as a continuation or successor state to Samo's realm. The polity has been called the first Slavic state.

== Main sources ==
The main source of written information on Samo and his realm is the Fredegarii Chronicon, a Frankish chronicle written in the mid-7th century (c. 660). Though theories of multiple authorship once abounded, the notion of a single Fredegar is now common scholarly fare. The last or only Fredegar was the author of a brief account of the Wends including the best, and only contemporary, information on Samo. According to Fredegar, "Samo [was] a Frank by birth [or nation] from the pago Senonago", which could be present-day Soignies in Belgium or present-day Sens in France. Although he was of Frankish origin, Samo demanded that an ambassador (Sicharius) of Dagobert I (King of the Franks) put on Slavic clothes before entering his castle.

All other sources for Samo are derived from Fredegar and are much more recent. The Gesta Dagoberti I regis Francorum ("Deeds of King Dagobert I of the Franks") was written in the first third of the 9th century. The Conversio Bagoariorum et Carantanorum ("Conversion of the Bavarians and Karantanians") from Salzburg (the Bavarian ecclesiastic centre), written in 871–72, is a very biased source, as its name suggests. According mainly to the Conversio, Samo was a Karantanian merchant.

The sources Fredegar used to compile his Wendish account are unknown. A few scholars have attacked the entire account as fictitious, but Fredegar displays a critical attitude and a knowledge of detail that suggest otherwise. It is possible that he had an eyewitness in the person of Sicharius, the ambassador of Dagobert I to the Slavs. According to Fredegar, the "Wends" had long been subjects and befulci of the Avars. Befulci is a term, cognate with the word fulcfree found in the Edict of Rothari, signifying "entrusted [to guard]", from the Old German root felhan, falh, fulgum and Middle German bevelhen. Fredegar appears to have envisaged the Wends as a military unit of the Avar host. He probably based his account on "native" Wendish accounts. Fredegar records the story of the origo gentis (origin of the people) of the Wends. The Wends were Slavic speakers, but Samo was the only king of the Wends, at least according to Fredegar.

It has also been suggested that Fredegar's sources may have been the reports of Christian missionaries, especially disciples of Columbanus and the Abbey of Luxeuil. If this is correct, it may explain why he is remarkably free of typical stereotypes of heathen Slavs, and why he was familiar with the Wends as a specifically pagan nation.

=== Reign ===
The dates for Samo's rule are based on Fredegar, who states that he "went to the Slavs in the fortieth year of Chlothar II" (i.e., 623–24) and reigned for thirty five years. The interpretation that places the start of Samo's reign in the year of Fredegar's arrival has been questioned on the basis that the Slavs (known also as the Wends) would have most likely rebelled after the defeat of the Avar khagan at the First Siege of Constantinople in 626. The Avars first arrived in the Pannonian Basin and subdued the local Slavs in the 560s. Samo may have been one of the merchants who supplied arms to the Slavs for their frequent revolts. Whether he became king during a revolt of 623–24 or during one that inevitably followed the Avar defeat in 626, he definitely took advantage of the latter to solidify his position. A string of victories over the Avars proved his utilitas (usefulness) to his subjects and secured his election as rex (king). Samo went on to secure his throne by marriage into the major Wendish families, wedding at least twelve women and fathering twenty-two sons and fifteen daughters.

Each year, the Huns [Avars] came to the Slavs, to spend the winter with them; then they took the wives and daughters of the Slavs and slept with them, and among the other mistreatments [already mentioned] the Slavs were also forced to pay levies to the Huns. But the sons of the Huns, who were [then] raised with the wives and daughters of these Wends [Slavs] could not finally endure this oppression anymore and refused obedience to the Huns and began, as already mentioned, a rebellion. When now the Wendish army went against the Huns, the [aforementioned] merchant Samo accompanied the same. And so the Samo's bravery proved itself in wonderful ways and a huge mass of Huns fell to the sword of the Wends.

— Chronicle of Fredegar, Book IV, Section 48, written circa 642

== See also ==
- Early Slavs
- History of Sorbs
- History of Slovenia
- History of the Czech lands
- History of Slovakia
- Outline of Slavic history and culture
- King of the Wends
