= Tunglo =

- Duke of the Sorbs
- Reign: ca. 826
- Predecessor: Miliduch
- Successor: Czimislav
- Religion: Old Slavic religion

Tunglo (c. 826) was an Early Slavic ruler (duke) of the Sorbs, a Polabian Slavic ancestral tribe of modern Sorbs. He is mentioned in the Royal Frankish Annals, as one of Sorbian leaders (Latin: unus de Soraborum primoribus) who was suspected of disobedience towards the Carolingian emperor Louis the Pius, as also recorded in the Vita Hludowici Imperatoris. In May 826, at a meeting at Ingelheim, dukes Čedrag of the Obotrites and Tunglo of the Sorbs (Latin: duos duces, Ceadragum Abotritorum et Tunglonem Soraborum) were accused in absence, and required to appear before the emperor. In October of the same year, both Čedrag and Tunglo came to Ingelheim, where the imperial assembly was held, thus trying to justify themselves to the emperor. In order to prove his loyalty, Tunglo surrendered his son as hostage and was allowed to return to his homeland.

== See also ==
- Dervan (duke)

== Sources ==
- Barkowski, Robert F. (2015). Słowianie połabscy: Dzieje zagłady. Warszawa: Bellona.
- Pertz, Georg Heinrich, ed. (1826). "Annales Laurissenses et Einhardi". Monumenta Germaniae Historica: Scriptores. Vol. 1. Hannoverae: Impensis Bibliopolii Aulici Hahniani. pp. 124–218.
- Pertz, Georg Heinrich, ed. (1829). "Vita Hludowici Imperatoris". Monumenta Germaniae Historica: Scriptores. Vol. 2. Hannoverae: Impensis Bibliopolii Aulici Hahniani. pp. 604–648.
- Pertz, Georg Heinrich, ed. (1845). Einhardi Annales. Hannoverae: Impensis Bibliopolii Hahniani.
- Scholz, Bernhard Walter, ed. (1970). Carolingian Chronicles: Royal Frankish Annals and Nithard's Histories. Ann Arbor: University of Michigan Press.
- Stone, Gerald (2016). Slav Outposts in Central European History: The Wends, Sorbs and Kashubs. London and New York: Bloomsbury Academic.

Preceded by last held by Miliduch Frankish rule	Duke of Sorbs fl. 826	Succeeded by Czimislav
