= Nisans =

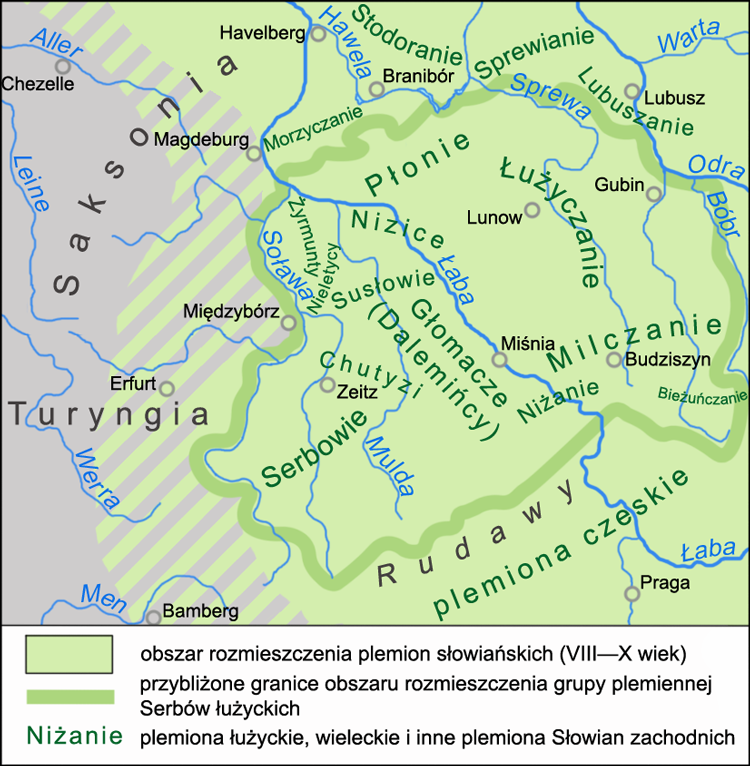
Nisans (Niżanie) and other Sorbian tribes in the Early Middle Ages

The Nisans (Latin: Niseni; Polish: Niżanie, Niszanie) were a Sorbian tribe that inhabited the basin of Elbe river, near the city of Dresden in modern Germany. Together with the neighboring Glomatians, Milceni, and other Sorbian tribes, they belonged to a wider Slavic group, known as the Polabian Slavs. Initially, Sorbian tribes were independent, but later fell under the supreme authority of Carolingian rulers and their successors. From 928 to 934, the East Frankish king Henry the Fowler conducted successful campaigns towards the Elbe regions, establishing outposts (March of Meissen) and imposing his rule over local Slavic tribes. In 984, according to the Thietmar's Chronicle, through the lands of Nisans and Glomatians, a pretender to the German throne Henry II, Duke of Bavaria was escorted by the army of Boleslaus II, Duke of Bohemia. In the following centuries, within boundaries of the March of Meissen, the region of Nisans (Latin: provincia Nisan; territorio Niseni) was still mentioned as a distinctive choronym (regional designation).

== See also ==
- Polabian Slavs
- Limes Sorabicus
- Battle of Lenzen
- Slavic uprising of 983

== Sources ==
- Althoff, Gerd (1999). "Saxony and the Elbe Slavs in the Tenth Century". The New Cambridge Medieval History. Vol. 3. Cambridge: Cambridge University Press. pp. 267–292.
- Bachrach, David S. (2020). "The Eastern Campaigns of King Henry II of Germany, 1003–17". Journal of Medieval Military History. 18: 1–36.
- Hardt, Matthias (2001). "Hesse, Elbe, Saale and the Frontiers of the Carolingian empire". The Transformation of Frontiers: From Late Antiquity to the Carolingians. Leiden: Brill. pp. 219–232.
- Stieldorf, Andrea (2026) [2012]. Marken und Markgrafen: Studien zur Grenzsicherung durch die fränkisch-deutschen Herrscher (2nd ed.). Wiesbaden: Harrassowitz Verlag.
- Trillmich, Werner, ed. (1957). Thietmar von Merseburg: Chronik. Darmstadt: Wissenschaftliche Buchgesellschaf.
- Warner, David A., ed. (2001). Ottonian Germany: The Chronicon of Thietmar of Merseburg. Manchester and New York: Manchester University Press.
- Wolfram, Herwig (2001). "The Creation of the Carolingian Frontier-System c. 800". The Transformation of Frontiers: From Late Antiquity to the Carolingians. Leiden: Brill. pp. 233–245.
- Leciejewicz, Lech (red.), Mały słownik kultury dawnych Słowian. Warsaw. Wiedza Powszechna. 1998. ISBN 83-214-0499-5.
