= Miliduch =

- Duke of the Sorbs
- Reign: ca. 790 to 806
- Predecessor: Dervan
- Successor: Tunglo
- Died: 806; Weißenfels
- Religion: Slavic

Miliduch or Miliduh (Latin: Miliduoch, Polish: Miłyduch, Serbian: Милидух; d. 806) was an Early Slavic ruler (duke) of the Sorbs, a Polabian Slavic ancestral tribe of modern Sorbs.

Formerly allied to Charlemagne, the Sorbs ended their vassalage to the Franks and rebelled, invading Austrasia. King Charles the Younger launched a campaign against the Slavs in Bohemia in 805, and after killing Duke Lecho of the Bohemians, Charles himself crossed the Saale with his army in 806 and clashed with Polabian Slavs near modern-day Weißenfels, gaining victory, while Slavic duke Miliduch fell in the battle. The region was laid to waste, upon which the other Slavic chieftains submitted and gave hostages.

In the Royal Frankish Annals, he is mentioned as a Slavic duke Miliduoch (Latin: Sclavorum dux) in relation to events that took place in the land of the Slavs, who are called Sorbs (Latin: in terram Sclavorum qui dicuntur Sorabi), while in the Annales Maximiniani he is similarly recorded as Milidoch, a duke (Latin: dux) in the land of the Slavs, who are called Sorbs (Latin: in terra Sclavanorum qui Suurbi dicuntur). Also, in the Chronicle of Moissac (Latin: Chronicon Moissiacense), he is mentioned as „Milito” or „Melito”, a king who ruled over Sorbs (Latin: rex superbus qui regnabat in Siurbis).

== See also ==
- Polabian Slavs

== Sources ==
- Barkowski, Robert F. (2015). Słowianie połabscy: Dzieje zagłady. Warszawa: Bellona.
- Pertz, Georg Heinrich, ed. (1826). "Chronicon Moissiacense". Monumenta Germaniae Historica: Scriptores. Vol. 1. Hannoverae: Impensis Bibliopolii Aulici Hahniani. pp. 280–313.
- Pertz, Georg Heinrich, ed. (1829). "Ex Chronico Moissiacensi". Monumenta Germaniae Historica: Scriptores. Vol. 2. Hannoverae: Impensis Bibliopolii Aulici Hahniani. pp. 257–259.
- Pertz, Georg Heinrich, ed. (1845). Einhardi Annales. Hannoverae: Impensis Bibliopolii Hahniani.
- Scholz, Bernhard Walter, ed. (1970). Carolingian Chronicles: Royal Frankish Annals and Nithard's Histories. Ann Arbor: University of Michigan Press.
- Waitz, Georg, ed. (1881). "Chronicon universale - 741, cum continuatione (Annalibus Maximinianis)". Monumenta Germaniae Historica: Scriptores. Vol. 13. Hannoverae: Impensis Bibliopolii Hahniani. pp. 1–25.

Preceded by last held by Dervan Frankish rule	Duke of the Sorbs fl. 790 – 806	Succeeded by Tunglo
