= Slavic Union =

Slavic Union may refer to:

- Slavic Union (Poland), an ethnic nationalist Russophile Polish political party founded in 2006
- Slavic Union (Russia), a Russian neo-Nazi organization banned in 2010

== See also ==
- Slavic nationalism (disambiguation)
- Pan-Slavism
