= Radulf, King of Thuringia =

7th century Thuringian ruler

Radulf (Latin: Radulfus) was the Duke of Thuringia (Latin: dux Toringiae) from before 632/633, until 641/642 when he proclaimed himself the King of Thuringia.

== Biography ==
According to the Chronicle of Fredegar, he was a son of one Chamar, a Frankish aristocrat, and rose to power under the Merovingian king Dagobert I, who appointed him as dux in the former Thuringian kingdom which Francia had conquered in 531.

His installation was meant to protect the eastern border of the Frankish realm against the threatening Wends under Samo, who had defeated the king at the 631 Battle of Wogastisburg and formed an alliance with Dervan, prince of the Sorbian tribes settling in the adjacent region east of the Saale river. Radulf fought successfully against the Slavs, but subsequently refused the incorporation of the secured territories into the Austrasian kingdom. To retain his independence he allied with Fara, a descendant of the powerful Agilolfing dynasty in Bavaria who ruled over large estates along the Main river, as well as forming treaties of alliance with the Wends, still under Samo.

About 641 King Sigebert III of Austrasia with his Mayors of the Palace, Adalgisel and Grimoald the Elder, marched against the insurgents and at first easily routed Fara's troops, while the Agilolfing himself was killed in battle. Reaching Thuringia however, Duke Radulf, entrenched in his fortress at the Unstrut river, was not overcome, partially because he had gained the support of significant numbers of the king's forces. In 642, he rebelled against Sigebert and defeated his army, taking the title of rex or king of Thuringia. His success is usually considered an indicator of the roi fainéant phenomenon and of undoing of the Merovingians' accomplishments. His sons, Theotbald and Heden I, succeeded him.

== Sources ==
- Hardt, Matthias (2020). "The Merovingians, the Avars, and the Slavs". The Oxford Handbook of the Merovingian World. New York: Oxford University Press. pp. 424–441.
- Krusch, Bruno, ed. (1888). Fredegarii et aliorum Chronica: Vitae sanctorum. Monumenta Germaniae Historica: Scriptores Rerum Merovingicarum. Vol. 2. Hannover: Impensis bibliopolii Hahniani.
- Reuter, Timothy (2013) [1991]. Germany in the Early Middle Ages c. 800–1056. London and New York: Routledge.
- Wallace-Hadrill, John Michael, ed. (1960). The Fourth Book of the Chronicle of Fredegar with its Continuations. London: Thomas Nelson.
