= Poppo =

Poppo can mean:

- Bubo, Duke of the Frisians, also spelled Poppo (674–734), a king of Friesland
- Poppo of Grapfeld (died 839/41), an early ninth-century ancestor of the Babenbergs
- Poppo, Duke of Thuringia (died after 906), a margrave
- Poppo I, Bishop of Würzburg (941–961)
- Poppo II, Bishop of Würzburg (961–983)
- Poppo (bishop of Kraków) (died 1008?)
- Poppo of Treffen, Patriarch of Aquileia from 1019 to 1045
- Poppo (archbishop of Trier) (986–1047)
- Pope Damasus II (died 1048), whose birthname was Poppo
- Poppo of Stavelot (Saint Poppo of Deinze, 977–1048), an abbot
- Poppo von Paderborn (died 1083), Bishop of Paderborn from 1076
- Poppo II, Margrave of Carniola and Istria (died 1098)
- Poppo I of Blankenburg (ca. 1095–1161 or 1164), Count of Blankenburg
- Poppo von Osterna (died 1257), a Grandmaster of the Teutonic Knights
- Poppo III von Trimberg, Bishop of Würzburg (1267–1271)
- Ernst Friedrich Poppo (1794–1866), a German scholar
- Ronald Edward Poppo (born 1947), American victim of the 2012 Miami cannibal attack

== See also ==
- Pidgey, the English name for Poppo in the Pokémon series
