= Čestibor =

- King of the Sorbs
- Reign: ca. 840 - 859
- Predecessor: Czimislav
- Successor: Slavibor
- Born: Čestibor
- Died: 859

Čestibor (Latin: Zistibor) was a 9th-century King of the Sorbs. He was a vassal of Louis the German. In 856 he led the Sorbs into battle alongside King Louis against the Glomacze tribe, defeating them and putting them under German rule. Shortly after in 859, the Sorbs had risen against Čestibor and killed him, causing a rebellion against King Louis.

Preceded by last held by Czimislav	King of the Sorbs fl. 840–859	Succeeded by Slavibor
