= Dervan (duke) =

7th-century duke and first recorded tribal ruler of the Sorbs

- Duke of the Sorbs
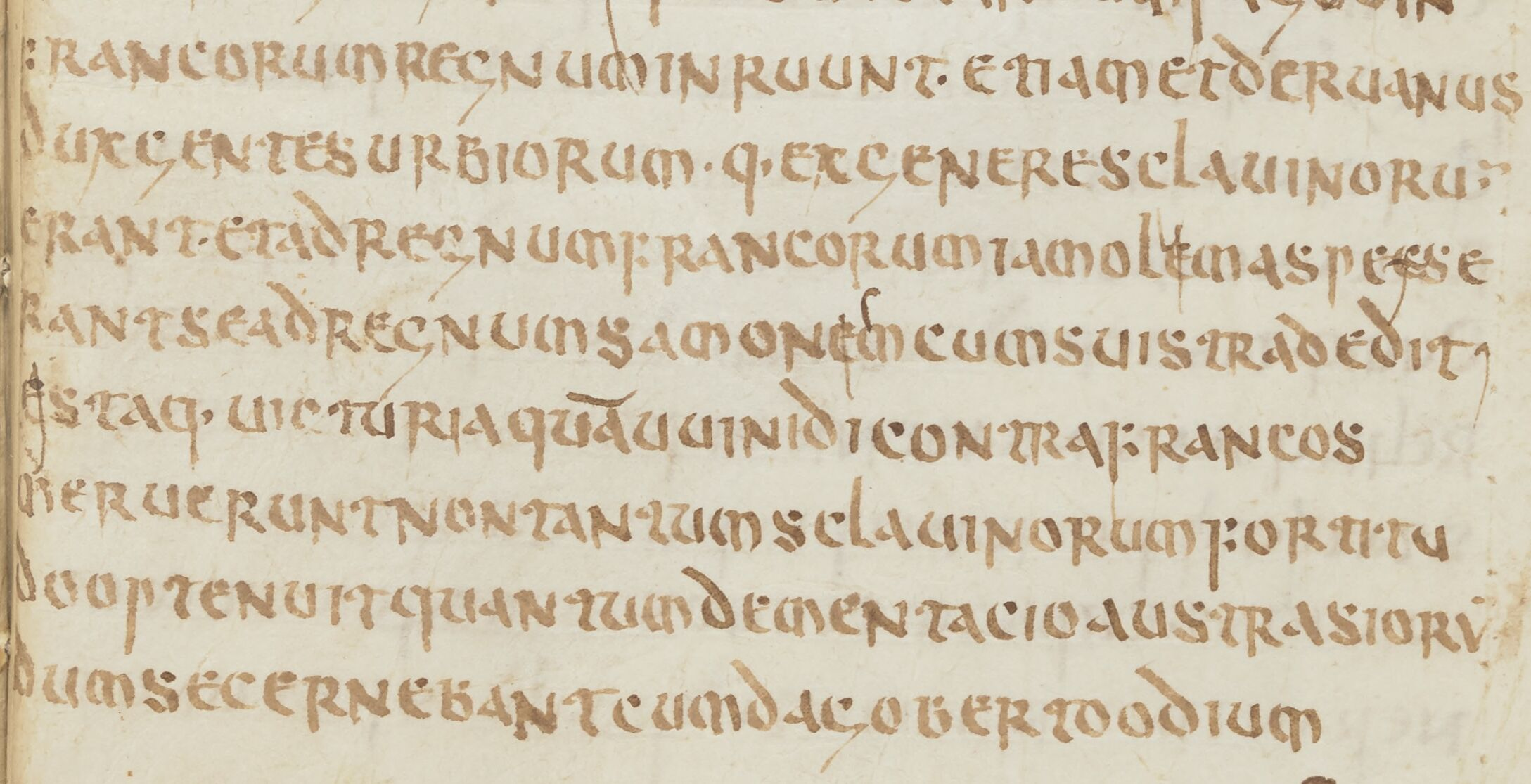
- The Chronicle of Fredegar mentions a "Dervanus dux gente Surbiorum" and is the only independent historical source containing details about his life
- Reign: c. 631/632
- Successor: Miliduch

Dervan or Derwan (Latin: Deruanus, fl. 615–636) was an Early Slavic ruler of the Sorbs, a Polabian Slavic ancestral tribe of modern Sorbs. He was the first Sorbian ruler mentioned by name in historical sources.

In the 7th-century Frankish Chronicle of Fredegar, he is mentioned as: Latin: Dervanus dux gente Surbiorum, que ex genere Sclavinorum erant, that was translated into English by John Michael Wallace-Hadrill as: Dervan, the duke of the Sorbes, a people of Slav origin.

The Chronicle records him being initially subordinate to the Frankish kings for a long time, prior to joining the Slavic tribal polity led by Samo. After the defeat of the Frankish king Dagobert I (623-634) by Samo's coalition near Wogastisburg in 631 or 632, Dervan declared independence from the Franks and "placed himself and his people under the rule of Samo".

Dervan joined Samo in his subsequent wars against the Franks. Further reports of the Chronicle of Fredegar imply that Dervan and his tribe lived to the east of the Saale. The reference to Dervan in 631/632 constitutes the first written confirmation of the presence of Slavs north of the Ore Mountains.

In 631–634, Slavs were fighting against the neighboring Thuringians, who were ruled by duke Radulf.

According to historians following the traditional identification of White Serbia as the lands of the Sorbs, Dervan was a relative of De Administrando Imperio's unnamed 7th-century Serbian ruler, narrated to have led the migration of the Serbs to the Balkans. According to Tibor Živković, the migration of the Serbs to the Balkans might have occurred between 629 and 632, prior to Dervan joining Samo. Others have argued that those migrations might have wakened the Sorbian polity, leading to Dervan's alliance with Samo against the Franks.

== Maps ==
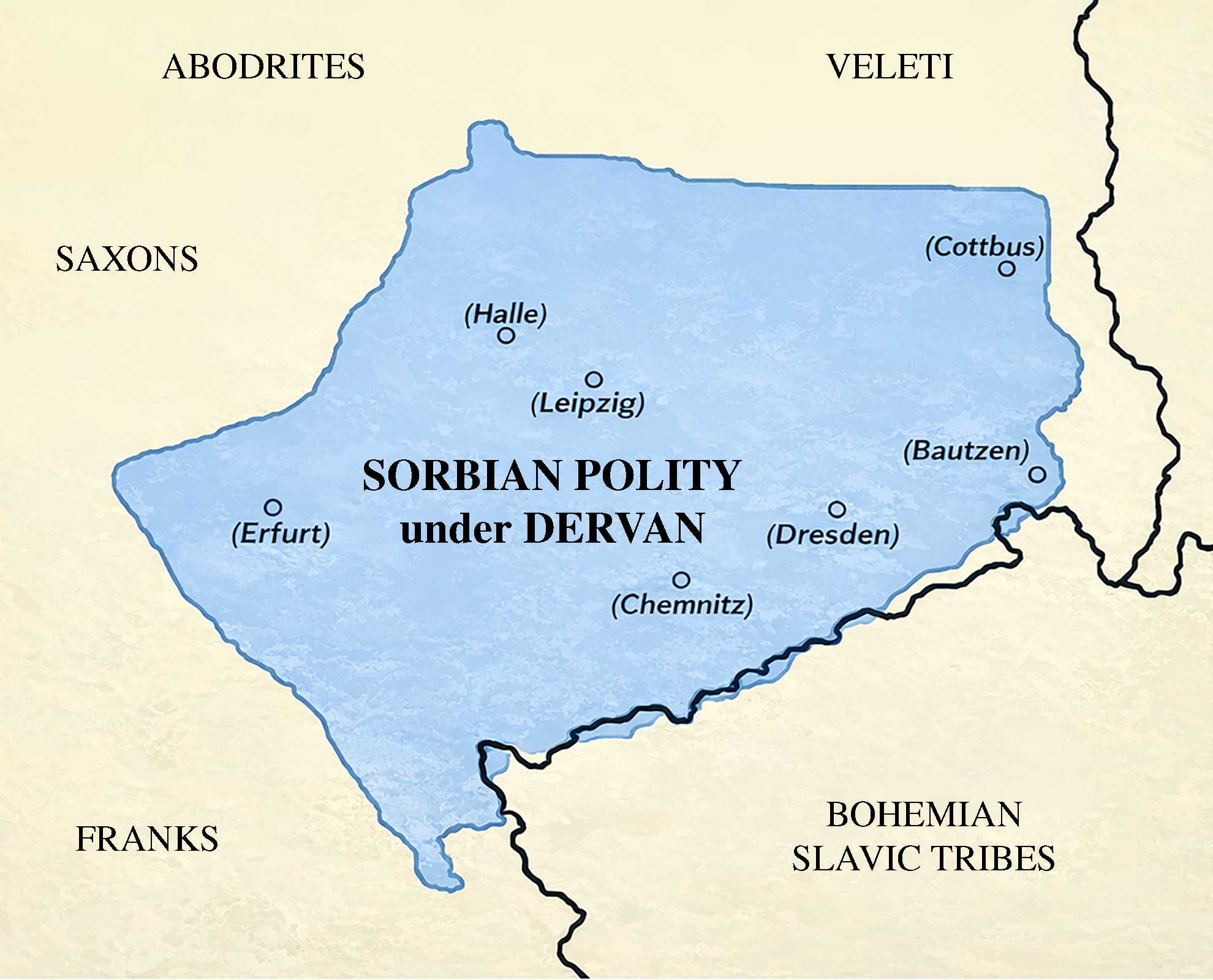
Approximate location of the areas in which Sorbian tribesmen were ruled over by Dervan in the 7th-century.

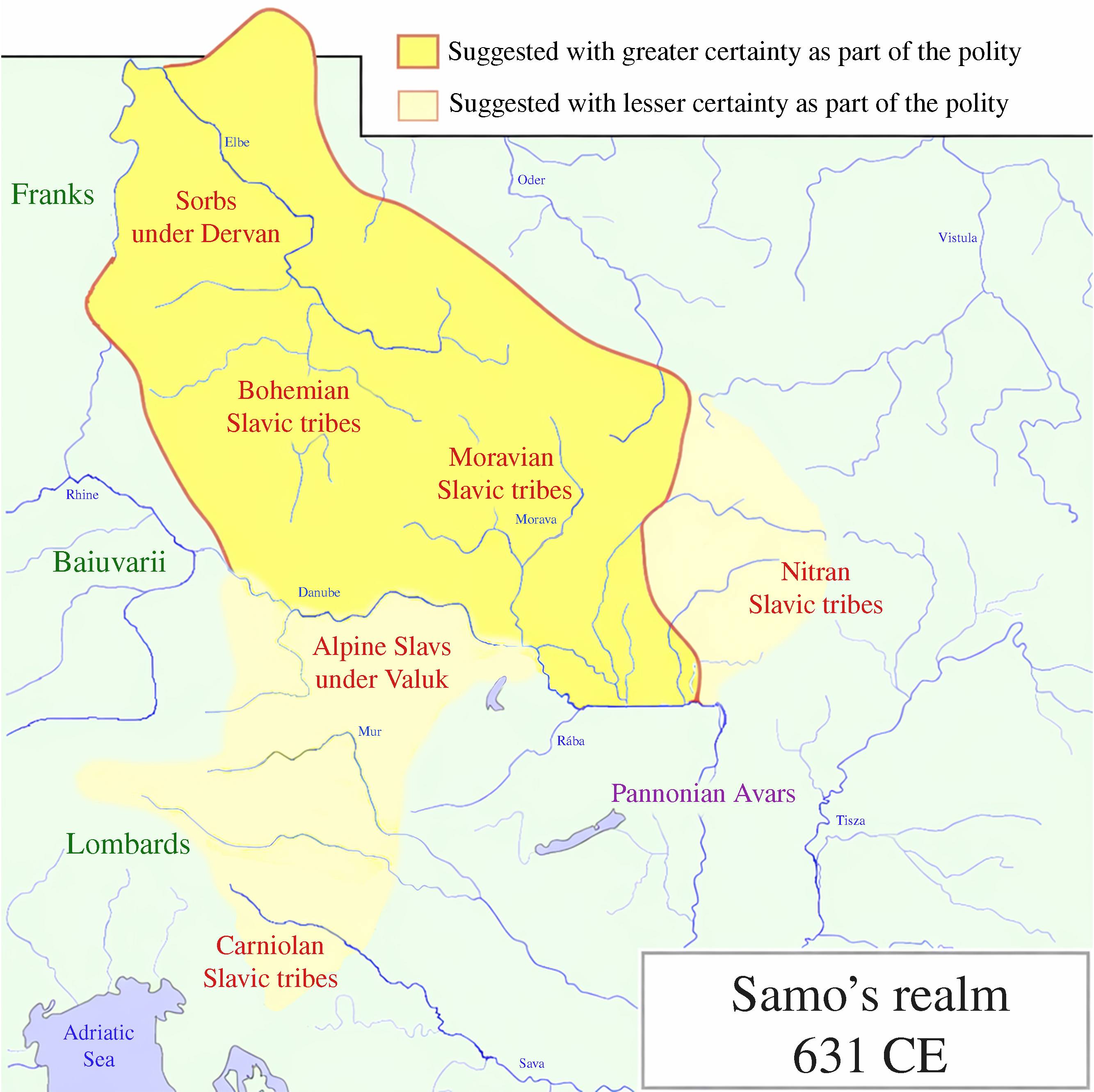
The tribe of the Sorbs under Dervan, as part of speculative reconstruction of the territories in which various Slavic tribes had pledged allegiance to Samo's tribal polity in 631

== Sources ==
- Curta, Florin (1997). "Slavs in Fredegar and Paul the Deacon: Medieval gens or scourge of God?" (PDF). Early Medieval Europe. 6 (2): 141–167. Archived from the original on 2025-07-20.
- Curta, Florin (2001). The Making of the Slavs: History and Archaeology of the Lower Danube Region, c. 500–700. Cambridge: Cambridge University Press.
- Curta, Florin (2019). Eastern Europe in the Middle Ages (500-1300). Leiden and Boston: Brill.
- Hardt, Matthias (2020). "The Merovingians, the Avars, and the Slavs". The Oxford Handbook of the Merovingian World. New York: Oxford University Press. pp. 424–441.
- Jenkins, Romilly, ed. (1962). Constantine Porphyrogenitus: De Administrando Imperio: A Commentary. London: Athlone Press.
- Kardaras, Georgios (2018). Byzantium and the Avars, 6th-9th Century AD: Political, Diplomatic and Cultural Relations. Leiden-Boston: Brill.
- Krusch, Bruno, ed. (1888). Fredegarii et Aliorum Chronica: Vitae Sanctorum. Monumenta Germaniae Historica: Scriptores Rerum Merovingicarum. Vol. 2. Hannover: Impensis bibliopolii Hahniani.
- Monod, Gabriel, ed. (1885). Études critiques sur les sources de l'histoire mérovingienne, II: La Compilation dite de Frédégaire. Paris: Vieweg.
- Wallace-Hadrill, John Michael, ed. (1960). The Fourth Book of the Chronicle of Fredegar with its Continuations. London: Thomas Nelson.

Preceded by Unknown	Duke (Dux) of the Surbiorum (Sorbs) c. 631/632	Succeeded by Miliduch
