= Slavibor =

- Prince of the Sorbs
- Reign: c. 859 - 894
- Predecessor: Čestibor
- Successor: Dragomir
- Born: Slavibor
- Died: 894

Slavibor was a Sorbian prince, and father of the Czech saint Ludmila.

Preceded by last held by Čestibor	King of the Sorbs fl. 859–894	Succeeded by Dragomir
