= George Burges =

English classical scholar

- Born: 1786; Bengal, British India
- Died: 11 January 1864 (aged 77–78); Ramsgate, Kent, England
- Education: Charterhouse; Trinity College, Cambridge (MA)
- Occupation: Classical scholar
- Spouse: Jane Burges
- Children: 6

George Burges (/ˈbɜːrdʒɪs/; 1786 – 11 January 1864) was an English classical scholar who published translations of the works of Euripides, Aeschylus, Sophocles, and Plato.

== Biography ==
Burges was born in Bengal, India, and was probably the son of Thomas Burges (d.1799) of Calcutta. He was educated at Charterhouse School and Trinity College, Cambridge, taking his B.A. degree in 1807 and obtaining one of the members' prizes both in 1808 and 1809 before becoming an M.A. in 1810. He stayed up at Cambridge and became a most successful coach and tutor. He had a great reputation as a Greek scholar, and was a somewhat acrimonious critic of rival scholars, especially Bishop Blomfield.

Subsequently, he fell into embarrassed circumstances through injudicious speculation, and in 1841 a civil list pension of £100 per annum was bestowed upon him. He died at Ramsgate, on 11 January 1864. Burges was a man of great learning and industry, but too fond of introducing arbitrary emendations into the text of classical authors.

== Works ==
His chief works are:

- Euripides' Troades (1807) and Phoenissae (1809).
- Aeschylus' Supplices (1821), Eumenides (1822), and Prometheus (1831).
- Sophocles' Philoctetes (1833).
- EF Poppo's Prolegomena to Thucydides (1837), an abridged translation with critical remarks.
- Hermesianactis Fragmenta (1839).

He also edited some of the dialogues of Plato with English notes including Meno, Parmenides, Statesman, and The Laws, and translated nearly the whole of that author and the Greek anthology for Bohn's Classical library.

He was a frequent contributor to the Classical Journal and other periodicals, and also dedicated to Byron a play called The Son of Erin, or, The Cause of the Greeks (1823).

== Personal ==
Burges married Jane (1801–83) with whom he had six children (3 sons and 3 daughters).
