= Sorbian March =

District of East Francia

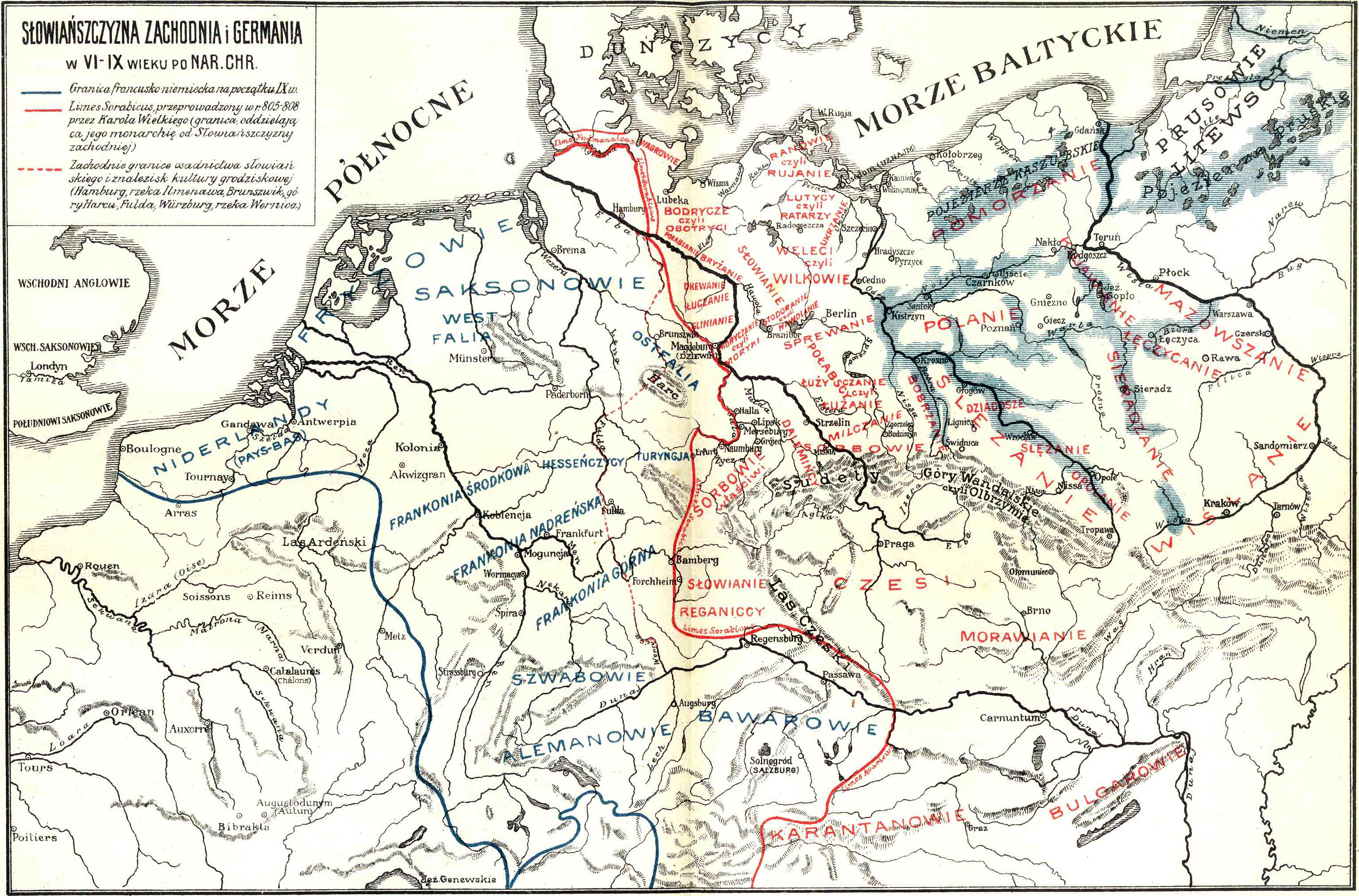
Limes Sorabicus and Slavic tribes on Carolingian borders

The Sorbian March (Latin: Limes Sorabicus, German: Sorbenmark, Upper Sorbian: Serbska marka, Lower Sorbian: Serbska marka) was a march (frontier district) on the eastern borders of the Carolingian Empire and the later Eastern Frankish Kingdom, during the 9th and 10th centuries. It encompassed frontier regions along the Saale river, bordering the Sorbs and other Polabian Slavic tribes. The term "Sorbian March" appears four times in the Annales Fuldenses. Since it was situated at the eastern borders of Thuringia, the Sorbian March is sometimes also referred to as the Thuringian March.

== History ==
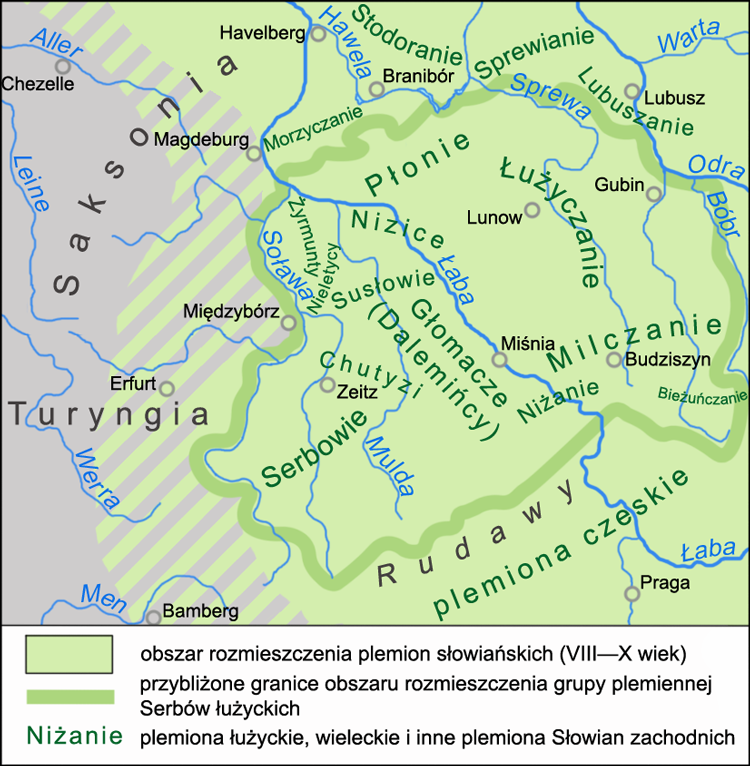
Sorbian tribes in the Early Middle Ages

Several commanders of the Sorbian March are recorded: Thachulf, Radulf, Poppo, and Burchard (probably). They bore the title dux Sorabici (limitis) in the Annales, but are also referred to elsewhere as counts (comites), margraves (marchiones), and dukes of Thuringia (duces Thuringorum). The march was probably ruled primarily by counts from the Babenberg family.

The boundary between Thuringia and the Sorbs was defined as the Saale river by Einhard, mentioning in the 830s "the river Saale, which divides the Thuringii and the Sorbs" (Latin: Salam fluvium, qui Turingos et Sorabos dividit). The Sorbian March probably (loosely) included the land east of the Saale as far as the Elster and the Pleisse, which might have been controlled by castles. The Sorbian March may have been only the area west of the Saale, east of it, or on both sides. Erfurt was then the chief economic centre of eastern Thuringia.

The Sorbian March was frequently troubled in the 9th century by uprisings of Slavic tribes, that were tributaries of East Frankish (German) kings. In the middle of the 10th century, much of those regions formed part of the March of Gero I, and were later included into the March of Meissen. At the beginning of the 11th century, German rule was temporarily challenged by the Duchy of Poland, that captured much of the region in 1002 and kept it upon the Treaty of Bautzen (1018), but those areas were later returned to German rule (1032).

== See also ==
- Slavic uprising of 983
- History of Thuringia
- History of Saxony
- History of Saxony-Anhalt

== Sources ==
- Althoff, Gerd (1999). "Saxony and the Elbe Slavs in the Tenth Century". The New Cambridge Medieval History. Vol. 3. Cambridge: Cambridge University Press. pp. 267–292. ISBN 978-0-521-36447-8.
- Bachrach, David S. (2012). Warfare in Tenth-Century Germany. Woodbridge: The Boydell Press. ISBN 978-1-84383-927-9.
- Bachrach, David S. (2013). "Henry I of Germany's 929 military campaign in archaeological perspective". Early Medieval Europe. 21 (3): 307–337. doi:10.1111/emed.12020.
- Bachrach, David S. (2020). "The Eastern Campaigns of King Henry II of Germany, 1003–17". Journal of Medieval Military History. 18: 1–36. JSTOR j.ctvxhrkx0.
- Hardt, Matthias (2001). "Hesse, Elbe, Saale and the Frontiers of the Carolingian Empire". The Transformation of Frontiers: From Late Antiquity to the Carolingians. Leiden: Brill. pp. 219–232. ISBN 978-90-04-47639-4.
- Leyser, Karl (1968). "Henry I and the Beginnings of the Saxon Empire". The English Historical Review. 83 (326): 1–32. doi:10.1093/ehr/LXXXIII.CCCXXVI.1. JSTOR 561761.
- Pech, Edmund (2015). "Milzener, Lusizer und Glomaci-Daleminzer: Kontroversen zur frühen Geschichte der Sorben". Lětopis: Zeitschrift für sorbische Sprache, Geschichte und Kultur: Časopis za rěč, stawizny a kulturu Łužiskich Serbow. 62 (2): 119–132.
- Pertz, Georgius Heinricus, ed. (1829). "Einhardi Vita Karoli Imperatoris". Monumenta Germaniae Historica: Scriptores. Vol. 2. Hannoverae: Impensis Bibliopolii Aulici Hahniani. pp. 426–463.
- Reuter, Timothy (1992). The Annals of Fulda. Manchester and New York: Manchester University Press. ISBN 978-0-7190-3458-9.
- Reuter, Timothy (2013) [1991]. Germany in the Early Middle Ages c. 800–1056. London and New York: Routledge. ISBN 978-1-317-87239-9.
- Stieldorf, Andrea (2026) [2012]. Marken und Markgrafen: Studien zur Grenzsicherung durch die fränkisch-deutschen Herrscher (2nd ed.). Wiesbaden: Harrassowitz Verlag. ISBN 978-3-447-17237-0.
- Stone, Gerald (2016). Slav Outposts in Central European History: The Wends, Sorbs and Kashubs. London and New York: Bloomsbury Academic. ISBN 978-1-4725-9210-1.
