= Czimislav =

- King of the Colodici
- Reign: ca. 839 - 840
- Predecessor: Tunglo
- Successor: Čestibor
- Born: Czimislav
- Died: 840

Czimislav (Latin: Cimusclus) was a 9th-century King of the Sorbs. The Saxons won a battle at Kesigesburg and Czimislav was killed in 840. He was part of the Colodici, a Sorbian sub-tribe.

Preceded by last held by Tunglo	King of the Sorbs fl. 830–840	Succeeded by Čestibor
