= Radulf II of Thuringia =

9th century Thuringian ruler

Radulf or Ratolf (died before 880) was the Duke of Thuringia (or the Sorbian March) from 874 until his death. Radulf was the successor and possibly son of Thachulf.

On Thachulf's death in August 873, the Sorbs, Siusli, and their neighbours revolted. Radulf and Liutbert, Archbishop of Mainz, crossed the Saale in January 874 and through a campaign of pillage and fire brought the Slavs into submission without a battle.

== Sources ==
- The Annals of Fulda. (Manchester Medieval series, Ninth-Century Histories, Volume II.) Reuter, Timothy (trans.) Manchester: Manchester University Press, 1992.
