= Thachulf, Duke of Thuringia =

9th century Thuringian ruler (died 873)

Thacholf, Thachulf, Thaculf, or Thakulf (died 1 September 873) was the Duke of Thuringia from 849 until his death. He held the titles of comes (count) and dux (duke) and he ruled over a marca (march). He may have been the son of Hadulf, son of Thankulf.

Thachulf was placed in charge of the Sorbian March in 849 with the title of dux Sorabici limitis, giving him military command over the counts with lands bordering the Sorbs. On account of his knowledge of Slavic customs, he was petitioned by the Sorbs with the offer of hostages for peace to protect them from the warmaking of Ernest, Duke of Bavaria, but he had been wounded in battle the day before the arrival of the Slav embassy and so could not be of assistance. Hiding his injury from the Slav delegates, he sent men to the other leaders of the Frankish host proposing terms with the Slavs, but the other generals suspected him of a coup to assume supreme command of the army and so ignored his representatives and made war anyway, being badly defeated in the process.

According to the Annales Fuldenses, in 858, a Reichstag held at Frankfurt under Louis the German sent three armies to the eastern frontiers to reinforce the submission of the Slavic tribes. Carloman was sent against Great Moravia, Louis the Younger against the Obodrites and Linonen, and Thachulf against the Sorbs, who were refusing to obey him. The armies of Carloman and Louis set out in July, but it is uncertain if Thachulf ever undertook a campaign, as the Sorbs rose in rebellion late in that year and do not appear to have been restless beforehand. The Annales Fuldenses may be incorrect about the timing of Thachulf's command to send an army against them.

Thachulf died on 1 September 873. His death was immediately followed by the revolt of the Sorbs, Siusli, and their neighbours. The revolt was not put down until Liutbert and Radulf, Thachulf's successor, campaigned in January 874.

== Sources ==
- The Annals of Fulda. (Manchester Medieval Series, Ninth-Century Histories, Volume II.) Reuter, Timothy (trans.) Manchester: Manchester University Press, 1992.
