= Lech (Bohemian prince) =

Early Czech leader

Lech ([lex]; died 805) was a Bohemian tribal ruler, one of the earliest named rulers in early Slavic Bohemia. The first reference to him is in the 805 entry of Annales Regni Francorum when Charles, son of Charlemagne, was sent to Bohemia to pacify the Slavs and according to the chronicle "laid waste to the country and killed their leader named Lecho". It is doubtful that Lecho ruled the whole territory now known as Bohemia. It probably consisted of more or less independent tribes, perhaps with some vassalage relationships with the emerging Great Moravia. The creation of early medieval Bohemian state probably occurred no sooner than at the end of the 9th century under Bořivoj, Spytihněv or perhaps even later dukes of the Přemyslid dynasty.

The name Lech is also attributed in some early Slavic foundation myths to the legendary founder of Poland.

== See also ==
- Lech, Čech, and Rus
- Lechitic languages

== Annotations ==
It is sometimes disputed that lech is rather a title, equivalent to voivoda, rather than a name. His name is sometimes written as Lecho or Becho.

Preceded by ?	Ruler of Bohemia ? – ca.805	Succeeded by Charles the Younger
