= Ernst Friedrich Poppo =

German classical scholar

- Born: 13 August 1794; Guben
- Died: 6 November 1866 (aged 72)
- Occupation: classical scholar

Ernst Friedrich Poppo (13 August 1794 – 6 November 1866), German classical scholar and schoolmaster, was born at Guben in Brandenburg. He studied at Leipzig.

In 1818 he was appointed director of the gymnasium at Frankfurt an der Oder, where he died on 6 November 1866, having resigned his post three years before.

Poppo was an extremely successful teacher and organizer, and in a few years doubled the number of pupils at the gymnasium. He is chiefly known, however, for his exhaustive and complete edition of Thucydides in four parts (11 vols., 1821-1840), containing:

1. A prolegomenon on Thucydides as an historian and on his language and style (English translation by George Burges, 1837), accompanied by historical and geographical essays
2. The text with scholia and critical notes
3. A commentary on the text and scholia
4. Indices and appendices.

For the ordinary student a smaller edition (1843–1851) was prepared; this edition was revised after the author's death by Johann Matthias Stahl (1875–1889).
