= Slavic nationalism =

Below is a list of the forms of Slavic nationalism.

- Pan-Slavism
  - Slavophile
  - Neo-Slavism
  - Austro-Slavism
- East Slavic
  - Russian nationalism/ Greater Russia
    - Russophilia
    - Russia for Russians
  - Ukrainian nationalism/ Greater Ukraine/ Little Russian identity
  - Belarusian nationalism
- West Slavic
  - Czech nationalism
  - Czechoslovakism
  - Slovak nationalism
  - Polish nationalism
- South Slavic, see rise of nationalism under the Ottoman Empire
  - Bosniak nationalism
  - Croatian nationalism/ Greater Croatia/ Illyrianism
  - Macedonian nationalism/ United Macedonia
  - Montenegrin nationalism
  - Serbian nationalism/ Greater Serbia
  - Serbian–Montenegrin unionism
  - Slovenian nationalism/ United Slovenia
  - Bulgarian nationalism/ Greater Bulgaria
  - Yugoslavism/ Yugoslav irredentism/ Balkan Federation
