= Gerald Stone (literary scholar) =

British linguist (1932–2021)

Gerald Charles Stone FBA (22 August 1932 – 11 September 2021) was a British linguist. From 1972 to 1999, he was a fellow of Hertford College, Oxford, and a lecturer in non-Russian Slavonic languages at the University of Oxford. He had previously taught at the universities of Nottingham and Cambridge. He instituted the teaching of Polish to undergraduates at Oxford, was a consultant to the Oxford English Dictionary and was general editor of the Oxford Slavonic Papers. He was elected a fellow of the British Academy in 1992.

== Publications ==
- The Smallest Slavonic Nation: The Sorbs of Lusatia (London: The Athlone Press, 1972)
- (with Bernard Comrie) The Russian language since the Revolution (Oxford: Clarendon Press, 1978)
- An Introduction to Polish (Oxford: Oxford University Press, 1980; 2nd edn, 1992)
- (with Bernard Comrie and Maria Polinsky) The Russian Language in the Twentieth Century (Oxford: Clarendon Press, 1995)
- Hornjoserbsko-jendźelski Słownik: Upper Sorbian–English Dictionary (Bautzen: Domowina Verlag, 2002)
- The Göda Manuscript 1701: A Source for the History of the Sorbian Language; with an Introduction and Glossary (Bautzen: Domowina-Verlag, 2009)
- Slav Outposts in Central European History: the Wends, Sorbs and Kashubs (London: Bloomsbury Academic, 2016)
