= List of Khazar rulers =

The following is a list of Khazar rulers.

== Khazar Khagans (Ashina dynasty) ==
The Khagans were supreme chiefs of the people, holding positions of much influence and spiritual authority, but with little day-to-day command. However, their lack of power is only mentioned after the khaganate's conversion to Judaism. No source mentions Khagans being inactive prior to this; instead, it is known that several Khagans played an active role in affairs and even personally led troops into battle (such as during the Arab-Khazar wars).

Name	Reign	Comments
Ziebel	618–630	Tong Yabghu Qaghan of the West Göktürks ?
Böri Shad?	630–650	Nephew of Tong Yabghu Qaghan. Might have ruled independently after Tong Yabgu's murder.
Irbis?	650	Irbis Seguy?
Khalga?	mid 660s?	During the period between 650 and 680, one will sometimes see references to a Khalga, mid 660s, and Kaban, late 660s. Researchers should be aware that these names are derived from a single document, the Cäğfär Taríxı, and that a great many scholars have severely attacked this document as a mixture of factual data and outright fabrication. The Cäğfär Taríxı purports to be a compilation of early Bulgar historical material, assembled (or at least written in its present form) in the late 17th century. It has been used by Volga Tatars to document that their antecedents in their region extend back in time by many centuries. Critics claim the Cäğfär Taríxı to be a forgery, created by or at the behest of the Soviet Secret Police (then the NKVD) in the 1930s for the purpose of creating divisiveness and factionalism within the ethnic Tatars of that era. The Soviet government did create spurious historical documents on several occasions. The historicity of the people that it refers to is therefore questionable, so until additional documentation comes to light, Khalga and Kaban should be regarded warily at best.
Kaban?	late 660s?	
Busir	c. 690–715	Busir Glavan took in the exiled Byzantine Emperor, Justinian II, and gave him his own sister (baptismal name Theodora). He later tried to kill Justinian to placate Tiberius III, causing Justinian's flight to Bulgaria and his ultimate restoration to the throne.
Barjik	715–731/732	Barjik was the commander during the Arab-Khazar War. Barjik is sometimes associated with the figure 'Barsbek'.
Prisbit	Early 730s	Female. Possible a Regent. Sometimes associated with the figure called 'Barsbek'.
Bihar	c. 732	Bihar is the name given in some sources to the Khazar Khagan whose daughter Tzitzak married the future Byzantine Emperor Constantine V. The son of Constantine and Tzitzak was Leo IV the Khazar.
Under the Umayyad Caliphate	737–c. 740	
Baghatur	c. 760	Ras Tarkhan is also mentioned in this period.
Khan-Tuvan (a.k.a. Dyggvi)	c. 825– 830 (died?)	hypothesized by scholar Omeljan Pritsak, based on norse sagas.
Tarkhan	840s	Arab sources speak of "Tarkhan, King of the Khazars" during this period. "Tarkhan" can be both a proper name and a military rank. It is unclear whether the sources refer to a Khagan named Tarkhan or make a confusing reference to a general.
Zachariah	c. 861	

== Khazar Beks ==
The Khagan Beks were war chiefs, military commanders who exercised considerable day-to-day authority, and were sometimes regarded by outsiders as the supreme lords of the Khazar nation.

Name	Reign	Comments
Yazir Bulash		It is not entirely clear that these individuals were or were not Bulanids. They may have been simply warlords. Nevertheless, their activity parallels that of the later Beks, and so are included.
Chorpan Tarkhan	c. 630	It is not entirely clear that these individuals were or were not Bulanids. They may have been simply warlords. Nevertheless, their activity parallels that of the later Beks, and so are included.
Alp Tarkhan	early 8th century	It is not entirely clear that these individuals were or were not Bulanids. They may have been simply warlords. Nevertheless, their activity parallels that of the later Beks, and so are included.
Tar'mach	c. 730	It is not entirely clear that these individuals were or were not Bulanids. They may have been simply warlords. Nevertheless, their activity parallels that of the later Beks, and so are included.
Hazer Tarkhan	?–737	It is not entirely clear that these individuals were or were not Bulanids. They may have been simply warlords. Nevertheless, their activity parallels that of the later Beks, and so are included.
Under the Caliphate	737–c. 740	It is not entirely clear that these individuals were or were not Bulanids. They may have been simply warlords. Nevertheless, their activity parallels that of the later Beks, and so are included.

== Conversion to Judaism ==
Hazer Tarkhan's army was annihilated at Itil in 737 AD, and the Umayyad Caliphate imposed Islam upon the Khazars. Nevertheless, the Caliphs could not adequately garrison Khazaria, and within a few years the Khazars were once again independent. The famous conversion to Judaism seems to have occurred about this time. The date of the actual conversion to Judaism is a matter of some controversy. According to Yehuda Halevi in Kuzari, it occurred around 740 AD, though some Arab sources point to a date closer to the end of the 8th century or early 9th century, and more recent scholars have postulated that 861 AD, the date of St. Cyril's visit to Khazaria, was the year of the conversion to Judaism.

The 2002 discovery of a coin hoard in Sweden further complicates the issue, as some of the coins bear dates from the early 9th century and the legends "Ard al-Khazar" (Land of the Khazars) and "Moses is the Prophet of God". Since the coins date from 837 AD or 838 AD, some scholars think the conversion occurred in 838 AD. Bulan/Sabriel was the Khazar ruler at the time of the conversion (however it is unknown whether he was Khagan or Bek, though the latter is more possible) but in the list below all the dates up to Aaron I are based on a presumed 740 AD conversion date.

== Bulanid dynasty ==
Name	Reign	Comments
Bulan Sabriel	c. 740	Joseph corresponded with Hasdai ibn Shaprut, a Jewish vizier to Abd al-Rahman III, Caliph of Córdoba. It is from that correspondence that this list is taken. It is not entirely ruled out that the Bulanids were in fact Khagans rather than Beks, though their power certainly appears to be that of the Beks. Moreover, it is possible that the positions merged in the 10th century, as Joseph makes no reference to a colleague, instead referring to himself as "king of the Khazars."
Obadiah	c. 786–809	Joseph corresponded with Hasdai ibn Shaprut, a Jewish vizier to Abd al-Rahman III, Caliph of Córdoba. It is from that correspondence that this list is taken. It is not entirely ruled out that the Bulanids were in fact Khagans rather than Beks, though their power certainly appears to be that of the Beks. Moreover, it is possible that the positions merged in the 10th century, as Joseph makes no reference to a colleague, instead referring to himself as "king of the Khazars."
Hezekiah		Joseph corresponded with Hasdai ibn Shaprut, a Jewish vizier to Abd al-Rahman III, Caliph of Córdoba. It is from that correspondence that this list is taken. It is not entirely ruled out that the Bulanids were in fact Khagans rather than Beks, though their power certainly appears to be that of the Beks. Moreover, it is possible that the positions merged in the 10th century, as Joseph makes no reference to a colleague, instead referring to himself as "king of the Khazars."
Manasseh I		Joseph corresponded with Hasdai ibn Shaprut, a Jewish vizier to Abd al-Rahman III, Caliph of Córdoba. It is from that correspondence that this list is taken. It is not entirely ruled out that the Bulanids were in fact Khagans rather than Beks, though their power certainly appears to be that of the Beks. Moreover, it is possible that the positions merged in the 10th century, as Joseph makes no reference to a colleague, instead referring to himself as "king of the Khazars."
Chanukkah		Joseph corresponded with Hasdai ibn Shaprut, a Jewish vizier to Abd al-Rahman III, Caliph of Córdoba. It is from that correspondence that this list is taken. It is not entirely ruled out that the Bulanids were in fact Khagans rather than Beks, though their power certainly appears to be that of the Beks. Moreover, it is possible that the positions merged in the 10th century, as Joseph makes no reference to a colleague, instead referring to himself as "king of the Khazars."
Isaac		Joseph corresponded with Hasdai ibn Shaprut, a Jewish vizier to Abd al-Rahman III, Caliph of Córdoba. It is from that correspondence that this list is taken. It is not entirely ruled out that the Bulanids were in fact Khagans rather than Beks, though their power certainly appears to be that of the Beks. Moreover, it is possible that the positions merged in the 10th century, as Joseph makes no reference to a colleague, instead referring to himself as "king of the Khazars."
Zebulun		Joseph corresponded with Hasdai ibn Shaprut, a Jewish vizier to Abd al-Rahman III, Caliph of Córdoba. It is from that correspondence that this list is taken. It is not entirely ruled out that the Bulanids were in fact Khagans rather than Beks, though their power certainly appears to be that of the Beks. Moreover, it is possible that the positions merged in the 10th century, as Joseph makes no reference to a colleague, instead referring to himself as "king of the Khazars."
Manasseh II		Joseph corresponded with Hasdai ibn Shaprut, a Jewish vizier to Abd al-Rahman III, Caliph of Córdoba. It is from that correspondence that this list is taken. It is not entirely ruled out that the Bulanids were in fact Khagans rather than Beks, though their power certainly appears to be that of the Beks. Moreover, it is possible that the positions merged in the 10th century, as Joseph makes no reference to a colleague, instead referring to himself as "king of the Khazars."
Nisi ben Menasseh		Joseph corresponded with Hasdai ibn Shaprut, a Jewish vizier to Abd al-Rahman III, Caliph of Córdoba. It is from that correspondence that this list is taken. It is not entirely ruled out that the Bulanids were in fact Khagans rather than Beks, though their power certainly appears to be that of the Beks. Moreover, it is possible that the positions merged in the 10th century, as Joseph makes no reference to a colleague, instead referring to himself as "king of the Khazars."
Aaron I	c. 900	Joseph corresponded with Hasdai ibn Shaprut, a Jewish vizier to Abd al-Rahman III, Caliph of Córdoba. It is from that correspondence that this list is taken. It is not entirely ruled out that the Bulanids were in fact Khagans rather than Beks, though their power certainly appears to be that of the Beks. Moreover, it is possible that the positions merged in the 10th century, as Joseph makes no reference to a colleague, instead referring to himself as "king of the Khazars."
Menahem		Joseph corresponded with Hasdai ibn Shaprut, a Jewish vizier to Abd al-Rahman III, Caliph of Córdoba. It is from that correspondence that this list is taken. It is not entirely ruled out that the Bulanids were in fact Khagans rather than Beks, though their power certainly appears to be that of the Beks. Moreover, it is possible that the positions merged in the 10th century, as Joseph makes no reference to a colleague, instead referring to himself as "king of the Khazars."
Benjamin	c. 920	Joseph corresponded with Hasdai ibn Shaprut, a Jewish vizier to Abd al-Rahman III, Caliph of Córdoba. It is from that correspondence that this list is taken. It is not entirely ruled out that the Bulanids were in fact Khagans rather than Beks, though their power certainly appears to be that of the Beks. Moreover, it is possible that the positions merged in the 10th century, as Joseph makes no reference to a colleague, instead referring to himself as "king of the Khazars."
Aaron II	c. late 920s –940	Joseph corresponded with Hasdai ibn Shaprut, a Jewish vizier to Abd al-Rahman III, Caliph of Córdoba. It is from that correspondence that this list is taken. It is not entirely ruled out that the Bulanids were in fact Khagans rather than Beks, though their power certainly appears to be that of the Beks. Moreover, it is possible that the positions merged in the 10th century, as Joseph makes no reference to a colleague, instead referring to himself as "king of the Khazars."
Joseph	940–965	Joseph corresponded with Hasdai ibn Shaprut, a Jewish vizier to Abd al-Rahman III, Caliph of Córdoba. It is from that correspondence that this list is taken. It is not entirely ruled out that the Bulanids were in fact Khagans rather than Beks, though their power certainly appears to be that of the Beks. Moreover, it is possible that the positions merged in the 10th century, as Joseph makes no reference to a colleague, instead referring to himself as "king of the Khazars."

== Late Khazar Rulers ==
In 969 AD, Sviatoslav I of Kiev sacked Itil, the capital of the Khazar Khaganate. Khazar successor states appear to have survived in the Caucasus and around the Black Sea. We know of two later Khazar rulers:

Name	Reign	Comments
David	c. 986–988	The authenticity of the only document that mentions him has been disputed.
Georgius Tzul (of Kerch)	?–1016	

== Collapse of Khazar power ==
Georgius Tzul was captured by a joint Rus'-Byzantine expedition and his state was destroyed. Shortly thereafter, the Kipchaks became masters of the Pontic steppe (see Cumans). However, there continue to be tantalizing references, in Muslim sources, of battles against "Khazars" in the Caucasus well into the late 11th century. Whether Khazar states continued to survive or their name was used generically to describe Caucasian highlanders is unclear.

The fate of the Jewish Khazars is unclear. Jewish travelers of the 12th century continue to refer to them in passing. Khazar Jews are known to have lived in Kiev and even to have emigrated to the Byzantine Empire and studied Judaism in Spain. According to some sources the majority may have gone to Hungary, Poland and the Crimea, mingling with Jews in those areas and with later waves of Jewish immigrants from the west.

== Sources ==
- Artamonov, Mikhail. Istoriya Khazar. Leningrad, 1962.
- Brook, Kevin A. The Jews of Khazaria. 3rd ed. Rowman & Littlefield Publishers, 2018.
- Christian, David. A History of Russia, Mongolia and Central Asia. Vol. 1. Blackwell, 1999.
- Dunlop, D. M. The History Of The Jewish Khazars. Princeton, NJ: Princeton University Press, 1954.
- Feldman, Alex M. The Monotheisation of Pontic-Caspian Eurasia: From the Eighth to the Thirteenth Century. Edinburgh University Press, 2022.
- Golb, Norman & Pritsak, Omeljan. Khazarian Hebrew Documents of the Tenth Century. Ithaca, N.Y.: Cornell University Press, 1992.
- Golden, Peter B. Introduction to the History of the Turkic Peoples. Wiesbaden: Harrasowitz, 1992.
- Golden, Peter B. Nomads and Sedentary Societies in Medieval Eurasia. Washington, D.C.: American Historical Society, 1998.
- Klyashtorny, S.G. and T.I. Sultanov. Kazakhstan. Alma-Ata, 1992.
- Mango, C. & R. Scott (trans.). The Chronicle of Theophanes Confessor. Oxford University Press, 1997.
