= List of state leaders in the 9th century =

This is a list of state leaders in the 9th century (801–900) AD.

== Africa ==
=== Africa: Northeast ===
- Makuria (complete list) –

- Mikhael, King (c.785/794–804/813)
- Ioannes, King (early–mid 9th century)
- Zakharias III, King (mid 9th century)
- Georgios I, King (late 9th–early 10th century)

=== Africa: Northcentral ===
- Rustamid dynasty (complete list) –

- ʿAbdu l-Wahhab ibn Abd ar-Rahman, Imam (788–824)
- Aflah ibn ʿAbdi l-Wahhab, Imam (824–872)
- Abu Bakr ibn Aflah, Imam (872–874)
- Muhammad Abu l-Yaqzan ibn Aflah, Imam (874–894)
- Yusuf Abu Hatim ibn Muhammad Abi l-Yaqzan, Imam (894–895, 899–906)
- Yaʿqub ibn Aflah, Imam (895–899)

- Aghlabid Emirs

- Ibrahim I ibn al-Aghlab ibn Salim (800–812)
- Abdallah I ibn Ibrahim (812–817)
- Ziyadat Allah I ibn Ibrahim(817–838)
- al-Aghlab Abu Iqal ibn Ibrahim (838–841)
- Muhammad I ibn al-Aghlab Abi Affan (841–856)
- Ahmad ibn Muhammad (856–863)
- Ziyadat Allah II ibn Muhammad (863)
- Abu 'l-Gharaniq Muhammad II ibn Ahmad (863–875)
- Abu Ishaq Ibrahim II ibn Ahmad (875–902)

=== Africa: Northwest ===
- Barghawata (complete list) –

- Ilyâs ibn Sâlih, King (792–842)
- Yunus ibn Ilyas, King (c.842–888)
- Abu Ghafir Muhammad, King (c.888–917)

- Idrisid dynasty of Morocco (complete list) –

- Idris II, Emir (791–828)
- Muhammad ibn Idris, Emir (828–836)
- Ali ibn Idris, Emir (836–849)
- Yahya ibn Muhammad, Emir (849–863)
- Yahya ibn Yahya, Emir (863–866)
- Ali ibn Umar, Emir (866–unknown)
- Yahya ibn al-Qasim, Emir (unknown–905)

- Emirate of Nekor (complete list) –

- Sa'id I ibn Idris, Emir (760–803)
- Salih II ibn Sa'id, Emir (803–864)
- Sa'id II ibn Salih, Emir (864–916)

== Americas ==
=== Americas: Mesoamerica ===
Maya civilization

- Calakmul (complete list) –

- Chan Pet, King (c. 849)

- Copán (complete list) –

- Yax Pasaj Chan Yopaat, King (763–post-810)
- Ukit Took, King (822–?)

- Palenque (complete list) –

- Janaab Pakal III, Ajaw (799–?)

- Tikal (complete list) –

- Nuun Ujol K'inich, Ajaw (c.800)
- Dark Sun, Ajaw (c.810)
- Jewel K'awiil, Ajaw (c.849)
- Jasaw Chan K'awiil II, Ajaw (c.869)

== Asia ==
=== Asia: Central ===
Tibet

- Tibetan Empire (complete list) –

- Sadnalegs, Emperor (c.800/04–c.815)
- Ralpacan, Emperor (815–836)
- Langdarma, Emperor (836–842)

Uzbekistan

- Samanid Empire (complete list) –

- Nuh ibn Asad, Amir (819–841)
- Yahya ibn Asad, Amir (819–855)
- Ahmad ibn Asad, Amir (819–864)
- Ilyas ibn Asad, Amir (819–856)
- Ibrahim ibn Ilyas, Amir (856–867)
- Nasr I, Amir (864–892)
- Isma'il ibn Ahmad, Amir (892–907)

=== Asia: East ===
Turks

- Uyghur Khaganate (complete list) –

- Ai tengride ülüg bulmïsh alp qutlugh ulugh bilge, Khagan (795–808)
- Ai tengride qut bulmïsh külüg bilge, Khagan (808–821)
- Kün tengride ülüg bulmïsh alp küchlüg bilge, Khagan (821–824)
- Ai tengride qut bulmïsh alp bilge, Khagan (824–832)
- Ai tengride qut bulmïsh alp külüg bilge, Khagan (832–839)
- Kürebir, Khagan (839–840)
- Öge, Khagan (841–847)

China

- Tang dynasty (complete list) –

- Dezong, Emperor (780–805)
- Shunzong, Emperor (805)
- Xianzong, Emperor (806–820)
- Muzong, Emperor (821–824)
- Jingzong, Emperor (824–826)
- Wenzong, Emperor (826–840)
- Wuzong, Emperor (840–846)
- Xuānzong, Emperor (846–859)
- Yizong, Emperor (859–873)
- Xizong, Emperor (873–888)
- Zhaozong, Emperor (888–904)

Japan

- Heian period Japan (complete list) –

- Kanmu, Emperor (781–806)
- Heizei, Emperor (806–809)
- Saga, Emperor (809–823)
- Junna, Emperor (823–833)
- Ninmyō, Emperor (833–850)
- Montoku, Emperor (850–858)
- Seiwa, Emperor (858–876)
- Yōzei, Emperor (876–884)
- Kōkō, Emperor (884–887)
- Uda, Emperor (887–897)
- Daigo, Emperor (897–930)

Korea: North–South States Period

- Balhae (complete list) –

- Gang, King (794–809)
- Jeong, King (809–812)
- Hui, King (812–817)
- Gan, King (817–818)
- Seon, King (818–830)
- Dae Ijin, King (830–857)
- Dae Geonhwang, King (857–871)
- Dae Hyeonseok, King (871–894)
- Dae Wihae, King (894–906)

- Later Silla (complete list) –

- Aejang, King (800–809)
- Heondeok, King (809–826)
- Heungdeok, King (826–836)
- Huigang, King (836–838)
- Minae, King (838–839)
- Sinmu, King (839)
- Munseong, King (839–857)
- Heonan, King (857–861)
- Gyeongmun, King (861–875)
- Heongang, King (875–886)
- Jeonggang, King (886–887)
- Jinseong, King (887–897)
- Hyogong, King (897–912)

=== Asia: Southeast ===
Indonesia: Java

- Mataram kingdom: Shailendra dynasty/Sanjaya dynasty (complete list) –

- Samaragrawira, King (800—819)
- Samaratungga, King (812—833)
- Pramodhawardhani, Queen (833—856)
- Rakai Pikatan, King (838—850)
- Balaputra, King (835–860)
- Balitung, King (899–911)

- Sunda Kingdom (complete list) –

- Pucukbumi Darmeswara, Maharaja (795–819)
- Prabu Gajah Kulon Rakeyan Wuwus, Maharaja (819–891)
- Prabu Darmaraksa, Maharaja (891–895)
- Windusakti Prabu Dewageng, Maharaja (895–913)

Malaysia: Peninsular

- Kedah Sultanate (complete list) –

- Maha Jiwa, Maharaja (c.788–832)
- Karma II, Maharaja (c.832–880)
- Darma Raja II, Maharaja (c.880–956)

Thailand

- Ngoenyang (complete list) –

- Lao Gab, King (8th–9th century)

Vietnam

- Champa (complete list) –

- Indravarman I, King (c.787–c.803)

=== Asia: South ===
Afghanistan

- Ghurid dynasty (complete list) –

- Amir Suri, Malik (9th–10th century)

- Turk Shahi (complete list) –

- Pati Dumi, King (?–815)
- Lagaturman, King (815–c.850)

Bengal and Northeast India

- Chavda dynasty (complete list) –

- Vanaraja Chavda, King (c.765–780)
- Yogaraja, King (c.806–841)
- Ratnaditya, King (c.842–845)
- Vairisimha, King (c.845–856)
- Kshemaraja, King (c.856–880)
- Chamunda or Bhuyada, King (c.881–908)

- Kamarupa: Mlechchha dynasty (complete list) –

- Salambha, King (795–815)
- Harjjaravarman, King (815–832)
- Vanamalavarman, King (832–855)
- Jayamala, King (855–860)
- Balavarman III, King (860–880)
- Tyagasimha, King (890–900)

- Mallabhum (complete list) –

- Kharga Malla, King (841–862)

- Pala Empire (complete list) –

- Dharmapala, King (8th–9th century)
- Devapala, King (9th century)
- Mahendrapala, King (9th century)
- Shurapala I, King (9th century)
- Vigrahapala I, King (9th century)
- Narayanapala, King (9th–10th century)

India

- Chahamanas of Shakambhari (complete list) –

- Govindaraja I, King (c.809–836)
- Chandraraja II, King (c.836–863)
- Govindaraja II, King (c.863–890)
- Chandanaraja, King (c.890–917)

- Chandelas of Jejakabhukti (complete list) –

- Nannuka, King (c.831–845)
- Vakpati, King (c.845–865)
- Jayashakti (Jayaśakti) and Vijayashakti, King (c.865–885)
- Rahila, King (c.885–905)

- Eastern Chalukyas (complete list) –

- Vishnuvardhana IV, King (772–808)
- Vijayaditya II, King (808–847)
- Kali Vishnuvardhana V, King (847–849)
- Vijayaditya III, King (849–892)
- Chalukya Bhima I, King (892–921)

- Chera Perumals of Makotai (complete list) –

- Rama Rajasekhara, King (c.800–844)
- Sthanu Ravi Varma, King (c.844–883)
- Goda Ravi, King (c.883–913)

- Chola dynasty (complete list) –

- Vijayalaya Chola, King (c.850–870)
- Aditya I, King (870–907)

- Eastern Ganga dynasty (complete list) –

- Anantavarman III, King (c.808–812)
- Rajendravarman II, King (c.812–840)
- Devendravarman IV, King (893–?)
- Devendravarman V, King (c.885–895)
- Gunamaharnava I, King (c.895–939)
- Vajrahasta II (or Anangabhimadeva I), King (c.895–939)

- Western Ganga dynasty (complete list) –

- Shivamara II, King (788–816)
- Rachamalla I, King (816–843)
- Ereganga Neetimarga, King (843–870)
- Rachamalla II, King (870–907)

- Gurjara-Pratihara dynasty (complete list) –

- Nagabhata II, King (800–833)
- Ramabhadra, King (833–836)
- Mihira Bhoja, King (836–885)
- Mahendrapala I, King (885–910)

- Kalachuris of Tripuri (complete list) –

- Lakshmana-raja I , King (825–850)
- Kokalla I, King (850–890)
- Shankaragana II, King (890–910)

- Kumaon Kingdom: Katyuri (complete list) –

- Basantana Dev, King (850–870)
- Kharpar Dev, King (870–880)
- Abhiraj Dev, King (880–890)
- Tribhuvanraj Dev, King (890–900)
- Nimbarta Dev, King (900–915)

- Pandyan dynasty (complete list) –

- Parantaka Nedunjadaiyan, King (765–815)
- Varagunan I, King (800–830)
- Srimara Srivallabha, King (815–862)
- Varagunavarman II, King (862–880)
- Parantaka Viranarayana, King (880–900)
- Maravarman Rajasimha II, King (900–920)

- Paramara dynasty of Malwa (complete list) –

- The Pallava dynasty has two chronologies of rulers.
- Dantivarman, King (late 8th–early 9th century)

- Nandivarman III, King (mid 9th century)
- Nirupathungan, King (late 9th century, only in Aiyangar chronology)
- Aparajitavarman, King (882/879–897)
- The Pallava dynasty has two chronologies of rulers.
- Upendra, King (c.800–c.818)
- Vairisimha I, King (9th century)
- Siyaka I, King (9th century)
- Vakpati I, King (9th–10th century)

- Rashtrakuta dynasty –

- Govinda III, King (793–814)
- Amoghavarsha, King (814–878)
- Krishna II, King (878–914)

- Sisodia (complete list) –

- Bhathabhatt, Rajput (790–813)
- Rawal singh, Rajput (813–820)
- Khumman II, Rajput (820–853)
- Mahayak, Rajput (853–878)

Sri Lanka

- Anuradhapura Kingdom, Sri Lanka (complete list) –

- Mahinda II, King (787–807)
- Dappula II, King (807–812)
- Mahinda III, King (812–816)
- Aggabodhi VIII, King (816–827)
- Dappula III, King (827–843)
- Aggabodhi IX, King (843–846)
- Sena I, King (846–866)
- Sena II, King (866–901)

=== Asia: West ===
Mesopotamia

- Abbasid Caliphate, Baghdad (complete list) –

- Harun al-Rashid, Caliph (786–809)
- al-Amin, Caliph (809–813)
- al-Ma'mun, Caliph (813–833)
- al-Mu'tasim, Caliph (833–842)
- al-Wathiq, Caliph (842–847)
- al-Mutawakkil, Caliph (847–861)
- al-Muntasir, Caliph (861–862)
- al-Musta'in, Caliph (862–866)
- al-Mu'tazz, Caliph (866–869)
- al-Muhtadi, Caliph (869–870)
- al-Mu'tamid, Caliph (870–892)
- al-Mu'tadid, Caliph (892–902)

Persia

- Saffarid dynasty (complete list) –

- Ya'qub ibn al-Layth al-Saffar, Amir (861–879)
- Amr ibn al-Layth, Amir (879–901)

- Samanid Empire (complete list) –

- Nuh ibn Asad, Amir (819–841)
- Yahya ibn Asad, Amir (819–855)
- Ahmad ibn Asad, Amir (819–864)
- Ilyas ibn Asad, Amir (819–856)
- Ibrahim ibn Ilyas, Amir (856–867)
- Nasr I, Amir (864–892)
- Isma'il ibn Ahmad, Amir (892–907)

Yemen

- Yemeni Zaidi State (complete list) –

- Muhammad ibn Ja'far al-Sadiq, Imam (783–818)
- Muhammad ibn Ja'far al-Sadiq, Caliph (815-818)
- al-Hadi ila'l-Haqq Yahya, Imam (897–911)

== Europe ==
=== Europe: Balkans ===
- First Bulgarian Empire (complete list) –

- Kardam, Khan (777–803)
- Krum, Khan (803–814)
- Omurtag, Khan (814–831)
- Malamir, Khan (831–836)
- Presian I, Khan (836–852)
- Boris I, Knyaz (852–889)
- Vladimir, Knyaz (889–893)
- Simeon I, Emperor (893–927)

- Byzantine Empire (complete list) –

- Irene, Regent (780–790, 792–797), Empress (797–802)
- Nikephoros I, Emperor (802–811)
- Staurakios, Co-Emperor (802–811), Emperor (811)
- Michael I Rangabe, Emperor (811–813)
- Theophylact, Co-Emperor (811–813)
- Leo V the Armenian, Emperor (813–820)
- Constantine (Symbatios), Junior Emperor (813–820)
- Michael II the Amorian, Emperor (820–829)
- Theophilos, Emperor (829–842)
- Michael III, Emperor (842–867)
- Basil I the Macedonian, Emperor (867–886)
- Leo VI the Wise, Co-Emperor (870–886), Emperor (886–912)

- Emirate of Crete (complete list) –

- Abu Hafs Umar al-Iqritishi, Emir (827/828–c.855)
- Shu'ayb ibn Umar, Emir (c.855–880)
- Abu Abdallah Umar ibn Shu'ayb, Emir (c.880–895)
- Muhammad ibn Shu'ayb al-Zarkun, Emir (c.895–910)

- Duchy of Croatia (complete list) –

- Višeslav, Duke (c.785–c.802)
- Borna, Duke (c.810–821)
- Vladislav, Duke (821–c.823)
- Ljudemisl, Duke (c.823–c.835)
- Mislav, Duke (c.835–c.845)
- Trpimir I, Duke (845–864)
- Domagoj, Duke (864–876)
- Iljko, Duke (876–878)
- Zdeslav, Duke (878–879)
- Muncimir, Duke (892–910)

- Principality of Serbia (complete list) –

- Višeslav, King (814–822)
- Radoslav, Prince (814–822)
- Prosigoj, Prince (?–c.830)
- Vlastimir, Prince (c.830–851)
- Mutimir, Prince (c.850–891)
- Pribislav, Prince (891–892)
- Petar, Prince (892–917)

=== Europe: British Isles ===
Great Britain: Scotland

- Dál Riata (complete list) –

- Caustantín mac Fergusa, King (unknown)
- Conall mac Taidg, King (c.805–807)
- Conall mac Áedáin, King (c.807–811)
- Domnall mac Caustantín, King (c.811–835)
- Óengus II, King (unknown)
- Eóganán mac Óengusa, King (unknown)
- Áed mac Boanta, King (c.835–839)
- Alpín mac Echdach, King (unknown)
- Cináed mac Ailpín, King (unknown)

- Picts (complete list) –

- Constantine (I), King (789–820)
- Óengus II, King (820–834)
- Drest IX, King (834–837)
- Eóganan, King (837–839)
- Uurad, competitor King (839–842)
- Bridei VI, competitor King (842–843)
- Ciniod II, competitor King (843)
- Bridei VII, competitor King (843–845)
- Drest X, competitor King (845–848)

- The Picts, traditionally The Scots (complete list) –

- Kenneth MacAlpin, King (843–858)
- Domnall mac Ailpí, or Donald I, King (858–862)
- Causantín mac Cináeda, or Constantine I (II), King (862–877)
- Áed mac Cináeda, King (877–878)
- Giric, King (878–889)
- Eochaid, disputed King (c.878–889)
- Donald II, King (889–900)
- Constantine II (III), King (900–943)

- Kingdom of Strathclyde / Alt Clut (complete list) –

- Cynan, King (798–816)
- Dumnagual IV, King (816–?)
- Constantine, King (? 859)
- Neithon, King (859–?)
- Artgal, King (?–872)
- Run, King (872–878)
- Eochaid, King (uncertain)
- Donald I, King (889–900)
- Donald II, King (889–900)
- Constantine II (III), King (900–943)

- Lochlann –

- Gofraid of Lochlann, King (pre-872–873)

- Isle of Man (complete list) –

- Gwriad, King (?–825)
- Merfyn Frych, King (825–836)

- Kingdom of the Isles (complete list) –

- Ketill Flatnose, King (9th century)

Great Britain: Northumbria

- Kingdom of Northumbria (complete list) –

- Eardwulf, King (796–806/808)
- Ælfwald II, King (806/808–808/810)
- Eanred, King (810–841)
- Æthelred II, King (840/841–844, 858–862)
- Redwulf, King (844)
- Osberht, King (844–848/849, 867)
- Ælla II, King (862/863–867)

- Norse era Northumbria / Scandinavian York (complete list) –

- Ecgberht, King (867–872)
- Ricsige, King (872–876)
- Halfdan Ragnarsson, King (876–877)
- Interregnum
- Guthfrith I, King (c.883–895)
- Siefredus, King (c.895–900)
- Cnut, King (c.900–905)

Great Britain: England

- The Britons (complete list) –

- Cynan Dindaethwy, King (798–816)
- Merfyn Frych, King (825–844)
- Rhodri ap Merfyn, King (844–878)
- Anarawd ap Rhodri, King (878–916)

- Kingdom of East Anglia (complete list) –

- Cœnwulf, King (?–821), also King of Kent and of Mercia
- Ceolwulf, King (821–823), also King of Kent and of Mercia
- Beornwulf, King (823–826), also King of Mercia
- Æthelstan, King post-827–840s)
- Æthelweard, King (840s–854)
- Edmund the Martyr, King (855–869)
- Oswald, Sub-King (870s)
- Æthelred II, Sub-King (870s)
- Guthrum, King (879–890)
- Eohric, King (890–902)

- Kingdom of Essex (complete list) –

- Sigered

- King (798–812)
- Duke (812–825)

- Kingdom of Kent (complete list) –

- Cuthred, King (797/798–807)
- Coenwulf, King (fl. 809)
- Ceolwulf I, King (fl. 822–823)
- Baldred, King (?–825)
- Egbert, King (825–839)
- Æthelwulf, King (825–858)
- Æthelstan, King (fl. 839–851)
- Æthelberht, King (fl. 855–866)
- Æthelred, King (866–871)

- Mercia (complete list –

- Coenwulf, King (796–821), also King of Kent and of East Anglia
- Ceolwulf I, King (821–823), also King of Kent and of East Anglia
- Beornwulf, King (823–826), also King of East Anglia
- Ludeca, King (826–827)
- Wiglaf, King (827–829, 830–839)
- Ecgberht, King (829–830)
- Wigmund, King (c.840)
- Ælfflæd, Regent (c.840)
- Beorhtwulf, King (840–852)
- Burgred, King (852–874)
- Ceolwulf II, King (874–c.879)
- Æthelred II, Lord (c.881–911)

- Kingdom of Wessex (complete list) –

- Beorhtric, King (786–802)
- Egbert, King (802–839)
- Æthelwulf, King (839–858)
- Æthelbald, King (858–860)
- Æthelberht, King (860–865)
- Æthelred, King (865–871)
- Alfred the Great, King (871–899)
- Edward the Elder, King (899–924)

Great Britain: Wales

- Glywysing (complete list) –

- Arthfael Hen ap Rhys, King (785–c.825)
- Rhys ap Arthfael, King (c.830–c.840)
- Hywel ap Rhys, King (c.840–886)
- Owain ap Hywel, King (886–c.930)

- Gwent (complete list) –

- Athrwys ap Ffernfael, King (774–810)
- Idwallon ap Gwrgant, King (810–842)
- Ithel ap Hywel, King (842–848)
- Meurig ap Hywel, King (848–849)
- Meurig ap Arthfael Hen, King (849–874)
- Ffernfael ap Meurig, King (fl. 880s)
- Brochfael ap Meurig, King (c.872-910)

- Kingdom of Gwynedd (complete list) –

- Cynan Dindaethwy ap Rhodri, King (c.798–816)
- Hywel ap Rhodri Molwynog, King (814–825)
- Merfyn Frych, King (825–844)
- Rhodri the Great, King (844–878)
- Anarawd ap Rhodri, King (878–916)

- Seisyllwg –

- Meurig ap Dyfnwal, King (770–807)
- Gwgon ap Meurig, King (808–872)
- Cadell ap Rhodri, King (872–909)

- Kingdom of Powys (complete list) –

- Cadell ap Brochfael, King (773–808)
- Cyngen ap Cadell, King (808–854)
- Rhodri Mawr, King (854–878)
- Merfyn ap Rhodri, King (878–900)
- Llywelyn ap Merfyn, King (900–942)

Ireland

- Ireland (complete list) –

- Áed Oirdnide, High King (793–817)
- Conchobar mac Donnchada, High King (819–833)
- Fedelmid mac Crimthainn, High King (836–841)
- Niall Caille, High King (832–846)
- Máel Sechnaill mac Máele Ruanaid, High King (846–860)
- Áed Findliath, High King (861–876)
- Flann Sinna, High King (877–914)

- Kingdom of Ailech (complete list) –

- Áed Oirdnide mac Néill, King (788–819)
- Murchad mac Máele Dúin, King (819–823)
- Niall Caille mac Áeda, King (823–846)
- Máel Dúin mac Áeda, King (846–?)
- Áed Findliath mac Néill, King (c.855–879)
- Murchad mac Máele Dúin, King (879–887)
- Flaithbertach mac Murchado, King (887–896)
- Domnall mac Áeda, King (887–915)
- Niall Glúndub mac Áeda, King (896–919)

- Airgíalla (complete list) –

- Cu Masach mac Cathal, King (?–825)
- Gofraidh mac Fearghus, King (fl.835)
- Foghartaigh mac Mael Breasal, King (?–850/852)
- Congalach mac Finnachta, King (?–874)
- Mael Padraig mac Mael Curarada, King (?–882)
- Maol Craoibh ua Duibh Sionach, King (?–917)

- Kingdom of Breifne (complete list) –

- Muircheartach mac Donnghal, King (c.800–806)
- Mael Dúin mac Échtgal, King (?–822)
- Ceallach son of Cearnach, King (?)
- Tighearnán mac Seallachan, King (c.888)
- Ruarc mac Tighearnáin, Lord (c.893)

- Connachta (complete list) –

- Muirgius mac Tommaltaig, King (796–815)
- Diarmait mac Tommaltaig, King (815–833)
- Cathal mac Muirgiussa, King (833–839)
- Murchad mac Áedo, King (839–840)
- Fergus mac Fothaid, King (840–843)
- Conchobar mac Taidg Mór, King (872–882)
- Áed mac Conchobair, King (882–888)
- Tadg mac Conchobair, King (888–900)
- Cathal mac Conchobair, King (900–925)

- Kingdom of Dublin (complete list) –

- Amlaíb Conung, King (c.853–871)
- Ímar, King (c.857–873)
- Auisle, King (c.863–867)
- Oistin mac Amlaíb, possibly king (873–875)
- Halfdan Ragnarsson, disputed king (875–877)
- Bárid mac Ímair, King (873–881)
- Sichfrith mac Ímair, King (?–888)
- Sitriuc mac Ímair, King (?–896)
- Sichfrith Jarl, disputed king (893–?)
- Glúniarann, King (c.895)
- Ímar ua Ímair, King (?–904)

- Leinster (complete list) –

- Fínsnechta Cethardec, King (795–808)
- Muiredach mac Brain (died 818), King (808–818)
- Muiredach mac Ruadrach, King (818–829)
- Cellach mac Brain, King (829–834)
- Bran mac Fáeláin, King (834–838)
- Túathal mac Máele-Brigte, King (851–854)
- Ruarc mac Brain, King (854–862)
- Muirecán mac Diarmata, King (862–863)
- Dúnlaing mac Muiredaig, King (863–869)
- Ailill mac Dúnlainge (died 871), King (869–871)
- Domnall mac Muirecáin, King (871–884)
- Muiredach mac Brain, King (884–885)
- Cerball mac Muirecáin, King (885–909)

- Kingdom of Meath (complete list) –

- Muiredach mac Domnaill Midi, King (799–802)
- Diarmait mac Donnchado, King (802–803)
- Conchobar mac Donnchado, King (803–833)
- Niall mac Diarmato, King (?–826)
- Máel Ruanaid mac Donnchada Midi, King (833–843)
- Fland mac Maele Ruanaid, King (843–845)
- Máel Sechnaill mac Maíl Ruanaid, King (845–862)
- Lorcán mac Cathail, King (862–864)
- Conchobar mac Donnchado, King (?–864)
- Donnchad mac Aedacain, King (864–877)
- Flann Sinna mac Maíl Sechnaill, King (877–916)

- Uí Maine (complete list) –

- Dub Dá Leithe mac Tomaltach, King (?–816)
- Cathal mac Murchadh, King (794–816)
- Cathal mac Ailell, King (834–844)
- Mughroin mac Sochlachan, King (?–904)

- Ulaid / Ulster (complete list) –

- Eochaid mac Fiachnai, King (790–810)
- Cairell mac Fiachnai, King (810–819)
- Máel Bressail mac Ailillo, King (819–825)
- Muiredach mac Eochada, King (825–839)
- Matudán mac Muiredaig, King (839–857)
- Lethlobar mac Loingsig, King (857–873)
- Cathalán mac Indrechtaig, King (857–871)
- Ainbíth mac Áedo, King (873–882)
- Eochocán mac Áedo, King (882–883)
- Airemón mac Áedo, King (882–886)
- Fiachnae mac Ainbítha, King (886–886)
- Bécc mac Airemóin, King (886–893)
- Muiredach mac Eochocáin, King (893–895)
- Máel Mocheirge mac Indrechtaig, King (893–896)
- Aitíth mac Laigni, King (896–898)
- Cenn Etig mac Lethlobair, King (896–900)
- Áed mac Eochocáin, King (898–919)

=== Europe: Central ===
- East Francia, later Kingdom of Germany (complete list) –

- Louis the German, King (843–876)
- Louis the Younger, King (880–882)
- Charles the Fat, King (882–887)
- Arnulf, King (887–899)
- Louis the Child, King (899–911)

- Duchy of Alsace (see also) –

- Charles, Duke (829–831)
- Hugh, Duke (867–885)

- Prince-Bishopric of Augsburg (complete list) –

- Adalbero, Prince-bishop (887–909)

- Duchy of Bavaria (complete list) –

- Louis II the German, King (817–843)
- Carloman, King (876–880)
- Louis III the Younger, King (880–882)
- Charles the Fat, King (882–887)
- Engeldeo, Margrave (890–895)
- Luitpold, Margrave (895–907)

- Bohemians –

- Lech, Prince (?–805)

- Duchy of Bohemia (complete list) –

- Bořivoj I (c.867–c.889)
- Spytihněv I (c.894–915)

- March of Carinthia –

- Gundachar, Margrave (858–863), Prefect (863–869)

- Duchy of Franconia (complete list) –

- Henry, Margrave (882–892)

- County of Hainaut (complete list) –

- Reginar I, Count (870–898, 908–915)
- Sigard, Count (898–908)

- County of Frisia / County of Holland (complete list) –

- Gerolf, Count (880–896)
- Dirk I, Count (896–931)

- Lotharingia (complete list) –

- Lothair II, King (855–869)
- Charles the Bald, King (869–870)
- Louis the Younger, King (880–882)
- Charles the Fat, King (882–887)
- Arnulf of Carinthia, King (887–895)
- Zwentibold, King (895–900)
- Louis the Child, King (900–911)

- Magyar tribes (complete list) –

- Álmos, Grand Prince (c.850–c.895)
- Árpád, Grand Prince (c.895–c.907)

- Prince-Bishopric of Mainz (complete list) –

- Richholf, Prince-archbishop (787–813)
- Adolf, Prince-archbishop (813–826)
- Odgar, Prince-archbishop (826–847)
- Rabanus Maurus, Prince-archbishop (848–856)
- Karl, Prince-archbishop (856–863)
- Ludbert, Prince-archbishop (863–889)
- Sunderhold, Prince-archbishop (889–891)
- Hatto I, Prince-archbishop (891–913)

- Great Moravia (complete list) –

- Mojmir I, Duke (c.830–846)
- Rastislav, Duke (846–870)
- Slavomir, Duke (871)
- Svatopluk I, Duke (870–871, (871–pre-885), King (pre-885–894)
- Mojmír II, Duke (894–906)

- Margraviate of the Nordgau –

- Ernest, Margrave (?–861)
- Rodold, Margrave (861–c.880)
- Engeldeo, Margrave (c.880–895)
- Luitpold, Margrave (895–903)

- Obotrites (complete list) –

- Thrasco, Prince (?–c.800)
- Slavomir, Prince (pre-810–819)
- Ceadrag, Prince (819–post-826)
- Selibur, Prince (9th century?)

- Duchy of Saxony (complete list) –

- Abo, Duke (fl.c.785–811)
- Widukind, Duke (fl.c.777–810)
- Liudolf I, Duke (850–864/866)
- Bruno, Duke (864/866–880)
- Otto I, Duke (880–912)

- March of Pannonia (complete list) –

- Radbod, Margrave/Prefect (833–854)
- Carloman of Bavaria, Margrave/Prefect (856–?)
- William, co-Margrave (?–871)
- Engelschalk I, co-Margrave (?–871)
- Aribo, Margrave (871–909)
- Engelschalk II, Margrave in opposition (c.871–893)
- Luitpold, Margrave (893–907)

- Sorbs –

- Miliduch, Duke (fl.790–806)
- Tunglo, Duke (?–826)
- Czimislav, King (fl.830–840)
- Čestibor, King (c.840–859)
- Slavibor, Prince (c.859–894)
- Dragomir, Prince (894–?)

- Prince-Bishopric of Speyer (complete list) –

- Goddank, Prince-bishop (881–895/898)
- Einhard, Prince-bishop (895/898–913)

- Landgraviate of Sundgau –

- Hugo, Graf, Count (866–869)
- Liutfrid, Count (876–902)

- Duchy of Thuringia (complete list) –

- Thachulf, Duke (849–873)
- Radulf II, Duke (874–880)
- Poppo, Duke (880–892)
- Egino, Duke (882–886)
- Conrad, Duke (892–906)

- Elector-Bishopric of Trier (complete list) –

- Radbod, Prince-bishop (898–915)

- Prince-Bishopric of Worms (complete list) –

- Gunzo, Prince-bishop (859–872)
- Adelhelm, Prince-bishop (873–890)
- Dietlach, Prince-bishop (890–914)

=== Europe: East ===
- Volga Bulgaria (complete list) –

- Tuqyi, ruler (765–815)
- Aidar, ruler (815–865)
- Şilki, Iltäbär (865–882)
- Batyr Mö'min, ruler (882–895)
- Almış, Emir (895–925)

- Khazar Khaganate (complete list) –

Ashina dynasty: Khazar Khagans
- Khan-Tuvan, Khagan (c.825–830)
- Tarkhan, Khagan (840s)
- Zachariah, Khagan (c.861)
Bulanid dynasty
- Obadiah, ruler (c.786–809)
- Hezekiah, ruler (mid 9th-century)
- Manasseh I, ruler (mid 9th-century)
- Chanukkah, ruler (mid 9th-century)
- Isaac, ruler (late 9th-century)
- Zebulun, ruler (late 9th-century)
- Manasseh II, ruler (late 9th-century)
- Nisi ben Menasseh, ruler (late 9th-century)
- Aaron I, ruler (c.900)

- Slavs of Lower Pannonia –

- Vojnomir, Duke (c.790–810)
- Ljudevit (Lower Pannonia), Duke (c.810–823)
- Ratimir, Duke (c.829–838)
- Pribina, Prince (c.846–861)
- Kocel, Prince (c.861–c.876)
- Braslav, Duke (c.882–896)

=== Europe: Nordic ===
- Kingdom of Norway (872–1397) (complete list) –

- Harald Fairhair, King (c.872–930)

- Kingdom of Sweden (complete list) –

- Björn Ironside, King (early 9th century)
- Erik Björnsson, King (early 9th century)
- Erik Refilsson, King (early 9th century)
- Anund Uppsale, King (early 9th century)
- Björn at Hauge, King (c.829–831)
- Olof I of Sweden, King (mid 9th century)
- Erik Anundsson, King (mid 9th century)

=== Europe: Southcentral ===
Holy Roman Empire in Italy

- Kingdom of Italy (complete list) –

- Pepin, King (781–810)
- Bernard, King (810–818)
- Louis I, King (818–822)
- Lothair I, King (822–855)
- Louis II, King (844–875)
- Charles II the Bald, King (875–877)
- Carloman, King (877–879)
- Charles III the Fat, King (879–887)
Integrum: Simultaneous claimants

- Berengar I, King (888–896)
- Guy of Spoleto, King (889–894)
- Lambert of Spoleto, King (891–896)
- Arnulf of Carinthia, King (894–899)

- Ratold, sub-King (896)

- Berengar I, King (896–924)
- Lambert of Spoleto, King (896–898)
- Louis III of Provence, King (900–905)

- Principality of Benevento (complete list) –

- Grimoald III, Prince (787–806)
- Grimoald IV, Prince (806–817)
- Sico I, Prince (817–832)
- Sicard, Prince (832–839)
- Radelchis I, Prince (839–851)
- Radelgar, Prince (851–854)
- Adelchis, Prince (854–878)
- Waifer, Prince (878–881)
- Radelchis II, Prince (881–884, 897–900)
- Aiulf II, Prince (884–890)
- Orso, Prince (890–891)
- Guy, Prince (895–897)
- Peter of Benevento, Regent (897)
- Radelchis II, Prince (881–884, 897–900)
- Atenulf I, Prince (900–910)

- March of Istria –

- John, Duke (c.804)

- Papal States (complete list) –

- Leo III, Pope (795–816)
- Stephen IV, Pope (816–817)
- Paschal I, Pope (817–824)
- Eugene II, Pope (824–827)
- Valentine, Pope (827)
- Gregory IV, Pope (827–844)
- Sergius II, Pope (844–847)
- Leo IV, Pope (847–855)
- Benedict III, Pope (855–858)
- Nicholas I, Pope (858–867)
- Adrian II, Pope (867–872)
- John VIII, Pope (872–882)
- Marinus I, Pope (882–884)
- Adrian III, Pope (884–885)
- Stephen V, Pope (885–891)
- Formosus, Pope (891–896)
- Boniface VI, Pope (896)
- Stephen VI, Pope (896–897)
- Romanus, Pope (897)
- Theodore II, Pope (897)
- John IX, Pope (898–900)
- Benedict IV, Pope (900–903)

- Duchy of Spoleto (complete list) –

- Winiges, Duke (789–822)
- Suppo I, Duke (822–824)
- Adelard, Duke (824)
- Mauring, Duke (824)
- Adelchis I, Duke (824–834)
- Lambert of Nantes, Duke (834–836)
- Berengar, Duke (836–841)
- Guy I, Duke (842–859)
- Lambert I, Duke (859–871)
- Suppo II, Duke (871–876)
- Lambert I, Duke (876–880)
- Guy II, Duke (880–883)
- Guy III, Duke (883–894)
- Lambert II, Duke (894–898)
- Guy IV, Duke (895–898)
- Alberic I, Duke (898–922)
- Pietro I Candiano, Doge (887–888)
- Pietro Tribuno, Doge (888–912)

- March of Tuscany (complete list) –

- Boniface I, Margrave (812–813)
- Boniface II, Margrave (828–834)
- Aganus, Margrave (835–845)
- Adalbert I, Margrave (847–886)
- Adalbert II the Rich, Margrave (886–915)

- Republic of Venice (complete list) –

- Giovanni Galbaio, Doge (787–804)
- Obelerio Antenoreo, Doge (804–811)
- Agnello Participazio, Doge (811–827)
- Giustiniano Participazio, Doge (827–829)
- Giovanni I Participazio, Doge (829–837)
- Pietro Tradonico, Doge (837–864)
- Orso I Participazio, Doge (864–881)
- Giovanni II Participazio, Doge (881–887)
- Pietro I Candiano, Doge (887–888)
- Pietro Tribuno, Doge (888–912)

=== Europe: Southwest ===
Iberian Peninsula

- Kingdom of Asturias (complete list) –

- Alfonso II, King (791–842)
- Nepotian, King (842)
- Ramiro I, King (842–850)
- Ordoño I, King (850–866)
- Alfonso III, King (866–910)

- Emirate of Córdoba (complete list) –

- al-Hakam I, Emir (796–822)
- Abd ar-Rahman II, Emir (822–852)
- Muhammad I, Emir (852–886)
- Al-Mundhir, Emir (886–888)
- Abdallah ibn Muhammad, Emir (888–912)

Marca Hispanica

- County of Osona (complete list) –

- Borrell, Count (798–820)
- Rampon, Count (820–825)
- Bernard, Count (825–826)
- Aisso, Count (826–827)
- Guillemó, Count (826–827)

- County of Cerdanya (complete list) –

- Borrell, Count (798–820)
- Aznar Galíndez, Count (820–824)
- Galindo Aznárez, Count (824–834)
- Sunifred I, Count (834–848)
- Solomon, Count (848–869)
- Wilfred I the Hairy, Count (869–897)
- Miró II, Count (897–927)

- County of Urgell (complete list) –

- Borrell, Count (798–820)
- Aznar I Galíndez, Count (820–824)
- Galindo I Aznárez, Count (824–834)
- Sunifred I, Count (834–848)
- Solomon (or Miró), Count (848–870)
- Wilfred the Hairy, Count (870–897)
- Sunifred II, Count (898–948)

=== Europe: West ===
Franks

- Frankish Empire (complete list) –

- Charlemagne, King (768–814), Holy Roman Emperor (800–814)
- Louis I the Pious, King and Holy Roman Emperor (813–840)

Middle Francia

- Middle Francia –

- Lothair I, King (843–855)

- Upper Burgundy (complete list) –

- Lothar II, King (855–869)
- Rudolph I, King (888–912)

- Lotharingia (complete list) –

- Lothair II, King (855–869)
- Charles the Bald, King (869–870)
- Louis the Younger, King (880–882)
- Charles the Fat, King (882–887)
- Arnulf of Carinthia, King (887–895)
- Zwentibold, King (895–900)
- Louis the Child, King (900–911)

West Francia

- West Francia (complete list) –

- Charles II, called the Bald, 843–877

- Aquitaine: Charles the Child, 855–866; Louis the Stammerer, 866–877
- Neustria: Louis the Stammerer, 856–877

- Louis II, called the Stammerer, 877–879
- Louis III, 879–882, jointly with
- Carloman II, 879–884
- Charles the Fat, 884–888, Emperor 881
- Odo,* 888–898

- Aquitaine: Ranulf II, 888–889 (Ramnulfid, not Carolingian)

- Charles the Simple, King (898–922)

- Duchy of Aquitaine (complete list) –

- William I (893–918)

- County of Artois (complete list) –

- Odalric, Count (c.850s)
- Altmar, Count (c.890s)
- Adelelm, Count (?–932)

- Auvergne (complete list) –

- Guerin of Provence, Count (819–839)
- Gerard, Count of Auvergne, Count (839–841)
- William I, Count (841–846)
- Bernard I, Count (846–858)

- County of Boulogne (complete list) –

- Baldwin I, Count (896–918)

- Duchy of Brittany (complete list) –

- Alan I (876–907)

- Duchy of Burgundy (complete list) –

- Richard the Justiciar (898–921)

- Duchy of Gascony (complete list) –

- Gassia II (893–c.930)

- County of Paris (complete list) –

- Stephen, Count (778–811)
- Beggo, Count (815–816)
- Leuthard I of Paris, Count (816)
- Gerard II, Count (816)
- Leuthard II of Paris, Count (816–?)
- Conrad, Count (858–859)
- Adalard, Count (877)

- County of Poitou (complete list) –

- Renaud, Count (795–843)
- Bernard I, Count (814–828)
- Bernard II, Count (840–844)
- Emenon, Count (828–839)
- Ranulph I, Count (839–866)
- Ranulph II, Count (866–890)
- Robert I, Count (866–923)
- Aymar, Count (892–902)
- Ebalus, Count (890–893, 902–935)

- Kingdom of Provence (complete list) –

- Louis the Blind, King (887–928)

- County of Toulouse (complete list) –

- William of Gellone, Count (790–806)
- Beggo, Count (806–816)
- Berengar, Count (816–835)
- Bernard of Septimania, Count (835–842)
- Acfred, Count (842–843)
- William of Septimania, Count (844–849)
- Fredelon, Count (844–852)
- Raymond I, Count (852–863)
- Humfrid, Count (863–865)
- Sunyer, Count (863–865)
- Bernard II, Count (865–877)
- Bernard III Plantapilosa, Count (877–886)
- Odo, Count (886–918)
- William II of Aquitaine, Count (858–862, 918–926)
- Stephen, Count (862–863)
- Bernard Plantapilosa, Count (864–886)
- William I of Aquitaine, Count (886–918)

=== Eurasia: Caucasus ===
- Kingdom of Abkhazia (complete list) –

- Leon II, King (c.767–811)
- Theodosius II, King (c.811–837)
- Demetrius II, King (c.837–872)
- George I, King (c.872–878)
- Bagrat I, King (c.887–898)
- Constantine III, King (c.898–916)

- Arminiya (complete list) –

- Yazid ibn Mazyad al-Shaybani, Emir (799–801)
- Asad ibn Yazid al-Shaybani, Emir (801–802)
- Muhammad ibn Yazid al-Shaybani, Emir (802–803)
- Khuzayma ibn Khazim, Emir (803–?)
- Asad ibn Yazid al-Shaybani, Emir (c. 810)
- Ishaq ibn Sulayman, Emir (c. 813)
- Khalid ibn Yazid ibn Mazyad, Emir (813–?)
- Khalid ibn Yazid ibn Mazyad, Emir (828–832)
- Khalid ibn Yazid ibn Mazyad, Emir (841)
- Khalid ibn Yazid ibn Mazyad, Emir (c. 842–844)
- Muhammad ibn Khalid al-Shaybani, Emir (c. 842/844–?)
- Abu Sa'id Muhammad al-Marwazi, Emir (849–851)
- Yusuf ibn Abi Sa'id al-Marwazi, Emir (851–852)
- Muhammad ibn Khalid al-Shaybani, Emir (857–862)
- Ali ibn Yahya al-Armani, Emir (862–863)
- Isa ibn al-Shaykh al-Shaybani, Emir (870–878)

- Bagratid Armenia (complete list) –

- Ashot I, King (884–890)
- Smbat I, King (890–912)

- Kingdom of Hereti (complete list) –

- Sahl Smbatean, Prince (815–840)
- Adarnase I, Prince (840–865)
- Hama I, Prince (865–893)
- Adarnase II, King (897–943)

- Principality of Iberia (complete list) –

- Ashot I, Prince (813–830)
- Bagrat I, Prince (842/843–876)
- David I, Prince (876–881)
- Gurgen I, Prince (881–891)

- Kingdom of the Iberians (complete list) –

- Adarnase IV, King (888–923)

- First Kingdom of Kakheti (complete list) –

- Juansher, Prince (786–807)
- Grigol, Prince (786–827)
- Vache Kvabulidze, Prince (827–839)
- Samuel, Donauri, Prince (839–861)
- Gabriel, Donauri, Prince (861–881)
- Padla I Arevmaneli, Prince (881–893)
- Kvirike I, Prince (893–918)

- Klarjeti (complete list) –

- Sumbat I Mampali, King (870–889)
- Bagrat I, King (889–900)
- David I, King (900–943)

== Oceania ==
Easter Island

- Easter Island (complete list) –

- Ouaraa, King (c.800)
- Koroharua, King (?)
- Mahuta Ariiki, King (?)
- Atua Ure Rangi, King (?)
- Atuamata, King (?)
- Uremata, King (?)

== See also ==
- List of political entities in the 9th century
