= Bulanids =

Early ruling dynasty of the Khazar

The Bulanids were the ruling dynasty of the Khazar Khaganate during the 9th century and 10th century CE.

The dynasty is named after Bulan, who may or may not have been its founder. In other sources (see Schechter Letter), the founder of the dynasty is named Sabriel.

Whether the Bulanid rulers were Beks or Khagans is a matter of some debate. Several kings, such as Bulan, Obadiah, Benjamin, Aaron II, and Joseph are described as leading armies, passing legislation, treating with foreign dignitaries, and exercising other powers normally associated with the Bek. The Schechter Letter refers to Sabriel as a non Khagan, however to further muddle the issue, no co-ruler is ascribed to any of the rulers of the late 9th century or early 10th century.

Some scholars, such as Mikhail Artamonov and Omeljan Pritsak, have envisioned the rise of the Bulanids as a gradual or sudden coup against the ruling Ashina dynasty by a related, Judaized clan. Others have connected this hypothetical coup with the revolt of the Kabars. Alternatively, it has been suggested that the Khazars abandoned the dual monarchy some time after their conversion to Judaism and that the later kings ruled alone.

== King Joseph's account ==
The Khazar king Joseph gave the following account of the genealogy of the Bulanids.

Since [the time of the conversion to Judaism], when my fathers entered into this religion, the God of Israel has humbled all of their enemies, subjecting every folk and tongue round about them, whether Christian, Muslim, or pagan. No one has been able to stand before them to this day [about 960]. All of them are tributary. [But only about ten years later Joseph was defeated by the Russians, 969.] After the days of Bulan there arose one of his descendants, a king Obadiah by name, who reorganized the kingdom and established the Jewish religion properly and correctly. He built synagogues and yeshivot, brought in Jewish scholars, and rewarded them with gold and silver. [The Jewish scholars could have come from Baghdad and Constantinople.] They explained to him the Bible, Mishnah, Talmud and the order of divine services. The King was a man who revered and loved the Torah. He was one of the true servants of God. May the Divine Spirit give him rest! He was succeeded by Hezekiah, his son; next to him was Menasseh, his son; next to him was Hanukkah, the brother of Obadiah; next Isaac, his son; afterwards, his son Zebulun; then his son Moses [in some editions, Menasseh II]; then his son Nisi; then his son Aaron I; then his son Menahem; then his son Benjamin; then his son Aaron; and I, Joseph, the son of Aaron the King, am King, the son of a King, and the descendant of kings. No stranger can occupy the throne of my ancestors: the son succeeds the father. This has been our custom and the custom of our forefathers since they have come into existence. May it be the gracious will of Him who appoints all kings that the throne of my kingdom shall endure to all eternity.

The relationship between the Bulanids and earlier Khazar khagans is unknown, as is the issue of whether late Khazar rulers such as David of Taman and Georgius Tzul can be connected with this clan.

== Resources ==
- Kevin Alan Brook. The Jews of Khazaria. 2nd ed. Rowman & Littlefield Publishers, Inc, 2006.
- Douglas M. Dunlop, The History of the Jewish Khazars, Princeton, N.J.: Princeton University Press, 1954.
- Norman Golb and Omeljan Pritsak, Khazarian Hebrew Documents of the Tenth century. Ithaca: Cornell Univ. Press, 1982.
