= Manasses =

Origin
- Origin: Hebrew

Other names
- Related names: Manasseh

Manasses or Manasseh (/məˈnæsə/; Hebrew: מְנַשֶּׁה, Mənaše) is a biblical Hebrew name for men. It is the given name of seven individuals of the Bible, the name of a tribe of Israel, and the name of one of the apocryphal writings. The name is also used in the modern world.

== Biblical individuals ==
=== Son of Joseph ===
Manasses (Note: Hebrew: מנשה; Septuagint: Manassê; c. 2nd millennium BC) was the eldest son of Joseph and the Egyptian Asenath (Genesis 41:50-51; 46:20). The name means "he that causes to forget". Joseph gave the reason for this name: "God hath made me to forget all my toils, and my father's house" (Genesis 41:51). Jacob later blessed Manasses (Genesis 48), but gave preference to the younger son Ephraim, despite Joseph's protest in favour of Manasses. Through this blessing, Jacob placed Manasses and Ephraim in the same class with Ruben and Simeon (verses 3-5), providing the foundation for the admission of the tribes of Manasses and Ephraim.

=== Husband of Judith ===
Manasses, Judith's husband, died of sunstroke in Bethulia (Judith 8:2-3).

=== Story of Ahikar ===
Manasses appears as a character in the Story of Ahikar (not in Vulgata, but in the Septuagint) told by Tobit on the point of death. The Vatican Manuscript mentions Manasses (Manassês) as one "who gave alms and escaped the snare of death". The Sinaitic Manuscript, however, does not name anyone, but clearly attributes the almsgiving and escape to Achiacharus (Ahikar). The reading in the Vatican Manuscript may be an error.

=== Sons of Ezra's companions ===
Manasses was a son of Bani, one of the companions of Esdras who married foreign wives (Ezra 10:30).

Another Manasses was the son of Hasom, also one of the companions of Esdras (Ezra 10:33).

=== Ancestor of Jonathan ===
Manasses (according to k’thibh of Massoretic Text and Septuagint) was ancestor of Jonathan, a priest of the tribe of Dan (Judges 18:30). The Vulgate and k’ri of the Massoretic Text give Moses as the correct reading.

=== King of Judah ===
Manasseh was the thirteenth King of Judah, and son and successor to Hezekiah (2 Kings 20:21 sq.).

== Other notable people ==
Notable people bearing the regnal, religious, or given name Manasses, Manasseh or Menashe include:

- Manasseh (High Priest), Jewish High Priest, c. 245–240 BC
- Manasseh was the regnal name of two Khazar rulers of the Bulanids:
  - Manasseh I, mid to late 9th century
  - Manasseh II, late 9th century
- Manasses de Ramerupt (died after 1031), French noble
- Manasses II, Count of Rethel (died 1032), French noble
- Manasses, Count of Dammartin (died 1037), French noble
- Manasses III, Count of Rethel (1022–1065), French noble
- Manasses I (archbishop of Reims) (fl. 1069–1080), French archbishop
- Manasses II (archbishop of Reims) (died 1106), French archbishop, 1096–1106
- Manasses of Hierges (fl. 1140–1152), French crusader and constable of the Kingdom of Jerusalem
- Constantine Manasses (c.1130–c.1187), Byzantine historian
- Manassès II de Pougy (c.1130–1190), French bishop of Troyes, 1181–1190
- Manasses IV, Count of Rethel (died 1199), French noble
- Manasses V, Count of Rethel (died 1272), French noble
- Isaac Manasses de Pas, Marquis de Feuquieres (1590–1640), French soldier
- Menasseh Ben Israel (1604–1657), Portuguese Rabbi and publisher
- Manasseh Cutler (representative) (1742–1823), American clergyman and politician
- Manasseh Dawes (died 1829), English barrister and writer
- Manasseh Masseh Lopes (1755–1831), British politician
- Manasse ǃNoreseb (1840–1905), tribal chief in Namibia
- Manasseh Meyer (1843–1930), British businessman and philanthropist
- Menashe Skulnik (1890–1970), Jewish American actor
- Aaron Manasses McMillan (1895–1980), American doctor and politician
- Menassa Youhanna (1899–1930), Egyptian Coptic priest and historian
- Menashe Oppenheim (1905–73), Polish Jewish singer, composer, and songwriter
- Manasse Herbst (1913–1997), Hungarian German-speaking actor and singer
- Menashe Klein (1924–2011), Czech-American Hasidic Rebbe and posek
- Manasses Kuria (1929–2005), Kenyan Anglican Archbishop
- Menashe Kadishman (1932–2015), Israeli sculptor and painter
- Menashe Amir (born 1940), Iranian broadcaster and Israel expert
- Manasseh Sogavare (born 1955), Prime Minister of the Solomon Islands
- Manassé Nzobonimpa (born 1957), Burundian politician
- Manasseh Maelanga (born 1970), Solomon Islander politician
- Menashe Mashiah (born 1973), Israeli football referee
- Manasseh Ishiaku (born 1983), Nigerian footballer
- Manassé Enza-Yamissi (born 1989), Central African football player
- Menasheh Idafar (born 1991), British and Bahraini racing driver
- Manasseh Garner (born 1992), American football player
- Manasseh Lomole Waya, South Sudanese politician
- Manasse Mbonye, Rwandan astrophysicist

== See also ==
- Manasse (surname)
- Menashe (surname)
- Manassas (disambiguation)
