= Khan-Tuvan =

Khazar Khagan (9th century AD)

Tuğan Khagan
- Khagan of Khazars

Khagan of Khazaria
- Reign: 825 - 830 AD (In Opposition to Hanukkah ben Obadiah)
- Predecessor: Menasseh I
- Successor: Hanukkah ben Obadiah
- Born: Unknown (8th century)
- Died: After 830 AD
- House: Ashina? /Bulanids ?
- Religion: Tengriism

Khan-Tuvan Dyggvi also known as Tuğan Khagan,was the name of a Khazar Khagan of the 825 AD, hypothesized by scholar Omeljan Pritsak, .

Per Pritsak, Dyggvi led a rebellion of the Kabars against the Khagan Bek. As this rebellion took place roughly contemporaneously with the conversion of the Khazars to Judaism, Pritsak have speculated that the rebellion had a religious aspect. Omeljan Pritsak speculated that a Khazar khagan named Khan-Tuvan Dyggvi, escaped after losing a civil war, settled with his followers in the Norse-Slavic settlement of Rostov, married into the local Scandinavian nobility, and fathered the dynasty of the Rus' khagans. Constantine Zuckerman dismisses Pritsak's theory as untenable speculation, and no record of any Khazar khagan fleeing to find refuge among the Rus' exists in contemporaneous sources.

Duczko points out that the reconstruction by Pritsak is entirely speculative: Rostov did not exist that early in the 9th century, nothing is known about the presence of Rus at this time in this area, there are no records of Uppsala royal family being involved (per Pritsak, the bride of Dyggvi's son was from Ynglingar).

Nevertheless, the possible Khazar connection to early Rus' monarchs is supported by the use of a stylized trident tamga, or seal, by later Rus' rulers such as Sviatoslav I of Kiev; similar tamgas are found in ruins that are definitively Khazar in origin.

== See also ==
- Rus' Khaganate
- Dyggvi
