= Isaac (Khazar) =

King of Khazaria

Isaac was a Jewish ruler of the Khazars mentioned in the Khazar Correspondence. He probably reigned in the mid to late ninth century CE. Little is known about his reign. As with other Bulanid rulers, it is unclear whether Isaac was Khagan or Khagan Bek of the Khazars, although the latter is more likely. The short and long versions of King Joseph's Reply stated that he was preceded by his father Hanukkah and succeeded by his son Zebulun whereas Sefer ha-Ittim by Judah ben Barzillai stated that he was preceded by Manasseh I and succeeded by Manasseh II.

== Sources ==
- Brook, Kevin Alan (2018). The Jews of Khazaria (3rd ed.). Lanham: Rowman & Littlefield. ISBN 978-1538103425.
- Dunlop, Douglas M. (1954). The History of the Jewish Khazars. Princeton, NJ: Princeton University Press.
- Golb, Norman; Pritsak, Omeljan (1982). Khazarian Hebrew Documents of the Tenth Century. Cornell University Press. ISBN 978-0-8014-1221-9.
- Zuckerman, Constantine (1995). "On the Date of the Khazar's Conversion to Judaism and the Chronology of the Kings of the Rus Oleg and Igor". Revue des études byzantines. 53: 237–270. doi:10.3406/rebyz.1995.1906.
