= Nisi =

Nisi may refer to:

== Languages ==
- Nisi language (India) (or Nishi), a subject–object–verb and Sino-Tibetan language of the Tani branch
- Nisi language (China), a Sino-Tibetan language, still unclassified within branches of Southeastern Loloish (or Ngwi) languages
- Nisi Kham language, a dialect of a complex of Sino-Tibetan Magaric languages

== People ==
=== Given name ===
- Nisi Shawl (born 1955), African-American writer and journalist
- Nisi Mac Niata (6th century), Irish Gael whose death is described in the Book of Fenagh
- Nisi ben Menasseh, 9th-century Khazar ruler

=== Surname ===
- Aaron ben Nisi, Turkic Jewish ruler of the Khazars mentioned in the Khazar Correspondence
- Ana Nisi Goyco (1950–2019), Puerto Rican politician and pharmacist
- Nisi ben Menasseh (or Nisi ben Moses), Jewish Turkic ruler of the Khazars mentioned in the Khazar Correspondence
- Nisi Yosiyuki (born 1976), Japanese manga artist
- Nisio Isin (born 1981), stylized NisiOisin, Japanese novelist and manga writer

== Places ==
=== Greece ===
- Nisi, Elis, a village and a community in the municipal unit of Vouprasia
- Nisi, Grevena, a village part of the community of Kentro
- Nisi, Imathia, a settlement in Imathia
- Nisi, Pella, a settlement in the Pella regional unit

=== Other places ===
- Albu Nisi, a village in Elhayi Rural District, Khuzestan Province, Iran
- Hajj Hasan Nisi Pumping Station, a village and company town in Hoveyzeh Rural District, Khuzestan Province, Iran
- Nishitokyo, a city in Tokyo Metropolis, Japan
- Nisi, Nepal, a village development committee in Baglung District in the Dhaulagiri Zone

== Other uses ==
- Asa Nisi Masa, iconic phrase used during a key scene in Federico Fellini's 1963 film 8½
- Decree nisi, a ruling by a court that does not have any force until such time that a particular condition is met
- "Nisi sam" (Your Light), a 2014 song by Slovenian preteen singer Ula Ložar
