= Hezekiah (Khazar) =

King of Khazaria

Hezekiah was a ruler of the Khazars, probably in the mid ninth century CE.

According to the two surviving versions of King Joseph's Reply, he was the son of Obadiah, the descendant of Bulan who brought rabbinical scholars to and built yeshivot in Khazaria, but Obadiah's name was not attested in the possibly more authentic version of the Khazar king list quoted by Judah ben Barzillai in Sefer ha-Ittim, whereas Hezekiah's name was included in all three documents.

Nothing is known about Hezekiah's reign. As with other Bulanid rulers, it is unclear whether Hezekiah was Khagan or Khagan Bek of the Khazars, although the latter is more likely.

Hezekiah was succeeded by his son Menasseh I.

== Sources ==
- Kevin Alan Brook. The Jews of Khazaria. 3rd ed. Rowman & Littlefield Publishers, Inc, 2018. ISBN 1538103427, 978-1538103425
- Douglas M. Dunlop, The History of the Jewish Khazars, Princeton, N.J.: Princeton University Press, 1954.
- Norman Golb and Omeljan Pritsak, Khazarian Hebrew Documents of the Tenth Century. Ithaca: Cornell University Press, 1982. ISBN 0801412218, 978-0801412219
- Zuckerman, Constantine (1995). "On the Date of the Khazar's Conversion to Judaism and the Chronology of the Kings of the Rus Oleg and Igor". Revue des études byzantines. 53: 237–270. doi:10.3406/rebyz.1995.1906.
