= Aaron II =

King of Khazaria

A Khazar ruler during the early 10th century CE, Aaron ben Benjamin was the son of the Khazar king Benjamin. Whether Aaron, like the rest of the Bulanids, was a Khagan or a Bek is an unresolved issue.

According to the anonymous author of the Schechter Letter, during Aaron's reign a war was launched against Khazaria by a Byzantine-inspired coalition led by the Alans, who had been allies of Aaron's father Benjamin. Aaron defeated his enemies with the help of Oghuz mercenaries and captured the king of the Alans. Rather than execute his captive, he demanded an oath of fealty and spared his life. The Alan king's daughter married Aaron's son Joseph. In Khazarian Hebrew Documents of the Tenth Century, Omeljan Pritsak dated this war to the early reign of Romanos I (i.e., the early 920s CE).

== Sources ==
- Brook, Kevin Alan. The Jews of Khazaria. 3rd ed. Rowman & Littlefield Publishers, 2018.
- Dunlop, Douglas M. The History of the Jewish Khazars, Princeton, N.J.: Princeton University Press, 1954.
- Golb, Norman and Omeljan Pritsak. Khazarian Hebrew Documents of the Tenth Century. Ithaca: Cornell Univ. Press, 1982.
