= Zebulun (Khazar) =

King of Khazaria

Zebulun or Zevulun ben Isaac was a hypothetical Jewish Turkic ruler of the Khazars mentioned in the Khazar Correspondence but not mentioned in Judah ben Barzillai's Khazar king list in Sefer ha-Ittim. He probably reigned in the late ninth century CE. Little is known about Zebulun's reign. As with other Bulanid rulers, it is unclear whether he was Khagan or Khagan Bek of the Khazars, although the latter is more likely. Historical authenticity and accuracy of the only document mentioning his name has been questioned.

== Sources ==
- Kevin Alan Brook. The Jews of Khazaria. 3rd ed. Rowman & Littlefield Publishers, 2018.
- Douglas M. Dunlop, The History of the Jewish Khazars, Princeton, N.J.: Princeton University Press, 1954.
- Norman Golb and Omeljan Pritsak, Khazarian Hebrew Documents of the Tenth Century. Ithaca: Cornell Univ. Press, 1982.
