= Aaron I =

King of Khazaria

Aaron ben Nisi was a Jewish ruler of the Khazars mentioned in the Khazar Correspondence. He reigned around the year 900 AD. He was the son of Nisi ben Menasseh. Little is known about his life or reign. As with other Bulanid rulers, it is unclear whether Aaron was Khagan or Khagan Bek of the Khazars, although the latter is more likely.

He was succeeded by either Menahem or Benjamin.

== Sources ==
- Kevin Alan Brook. The Jews of Khazaria. 2nd ed. Rowman & Littlefield Publishers, Inc, 2006.
- Douglas M. Dunlop, The History of the Jewish Khazars, Princeton, N.J.: Princeton University Press, 1954.
- Norman Golb and Omeljan Pritsak, Khazarian Hebrew Documents of the Tenth Century. Ithaca: Cornell Univ. Press, 1982.
