= K'o-sa =

Uyghur tribe

The K'o-sa (Chinese: 可萨; pinyin: Kěsà) is an ancient Uyghur tribe mentioned by ancient Chinese texts. D. M. Dunlop believed that they were connected with the Khazars, and thus postulated a Uyghur, rather than Hunnish origin for that people. The K'o-sa, who belonged to a Tujue tribe, were first mentioned under Du Huan's accounts on Tongdian as possessing the areas northwest to the Byzantine Empire. They existed under a variant name in Suishu and formed part of the Tiele confederation whose presence was around or close to the Caspian Sea.

== See also ==
- Tele
- Uyghur
- Khazars
