= Menahem (Khazar) =

King of Khazaria

Menahem ben Aaron was a Khazar ruler of the late 9th century. He was the son of Aaron I and the father of Benjamin.

== Sources ==
- Kevin Alan Brook. The Jews of Khazaria. 2nd ed. Rowman & Littlefield Publishers, Inc, 2006.
- Douglas M. Dunlop, The History of the Jewish Khazars, Princeton, N.J.: Princeton University Press, 1954.
- Norman Golb and Omeljan Pritsak, Khazarian Hebrew Documents of the Tenth Century. Ithaca: Cornell Univ. Press, 1982.
