= David (Khazar) =

King David
- Khagan
- Reign: 986–998
- Predecessor: Joseph
- Successor: Georgius Tzul
- Religion: Judaism

A purported Khazar ruler of the late tenth century CE who ruled over a Khazar successor-state in the Taman region. David is mentioned in a single document dated AM 4746 (985/986 CE) which contains a reference to "our lord David, Prince of the Khazars, who lives in Taman." The document in question is of uncertain authenticity, as it passed through the hands of Abraham Firkovich, who on occasion forged documents and inscriptions. Dan Shapira expressed certainty that the document is a forgery by Firkovich and his viewpoint was adopted by other scholars who cited him including Michael Toch and Kevin Brook.

Based upon this text, Heinrich Graetz hypothesized that the Khazars reorganized themselves after 969 in Crimea and the Taman peninsula. Graetz further maintained that the Khazar Jewish representatives summoned by Vladimir I of Kiev to debate the merits of their religion against representatives from Catholic Germany, Orthodox Byzantium, and Muslim Volga Bulgaria were dispatched by David and were citizens of his Pontic kingdom.

David's capital may have been in or near Tmutorakan; though rule by the Kievan Rus is reported in Russian sources before 985, it is conceivable that the Khazars reasserted control over the town or that David ruled as a client. The first independent Russian prince of Tmutorakan is Mstislav, whose rule began in 988. The later Khazar ruler Georgius Tzul ruled from Kerch; it is uncertain whether his kingdom was the same polity that had earlier been under the rule of David of Taman.

== Resources ==
- Kevin Alan Brook. The Jews of Khazaria. 3rd ed. Rowman & Littlefield Publishers, 2018. ISBN 9781538103425
- Douglas M. Dunlop, The History of the Jewish Khazars, Princeton, N.J.: Princeton University Press, 1954.
- Dan D. Y. Shapira, "Remarks on Avraham Firkowicz and the Hebrew Mejelis 'Document'." Acta Orientalia Academiae Scientiarum Hungaricae vol. 59, no. 2 (2006): pp. 131–180, doi:10.1556/AOrient.59.2006.2.1
- Dan D. Y. Shapira, "Khazars and Karaites, Again." Karadeniz Araştırmaları no. 13 (Spring 2007): pp. 43–64.
