= The World of the Orient =

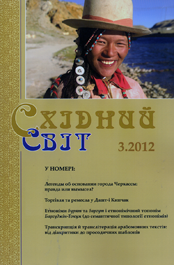
- Discipline: Area studies, History, Linguistics
- Language: Ukrainian, English
- Edited by: Ivanna Otroshchenko

Publication details
- History: 1993–present
- Publisher: A. Yu. Krymskyi Institute of Oriental Studies (Ukraine)
- Frequency: Quarterly

Standard abbreviations
- ISO 4: World Orient

Indexing
- ISSN: 1608-0599 (print); 1682-5268 (web)

Links
- Journal homepage; Online access; Online archive

The World of the Orient (Ukrainian: Східний світ, romanized: Skhidnyi Svit) is a quarterly peer-reviewed academic journal published by the A. Yu. Krymskyi Institute of Oriental Studies of the National Academy of Sciences of Ukraine.

The journal publishes articles on topical issues related to the past and present of the Orient, Oriental languages and literature, contacts of Ukraine with the Oriental countries, bibliographic surveys and reviews, as well as information about academic conferences. Publications on the Crimean studies, Caucasian studies, African studies and Asian Diasporas in different parts of the world are welcome as well. The journal accepts original research articles from Ukrainian and foreign authors. Besides, the translations of historical sources, religious and literary heritage of the Orient are published. Languages of publication are Ukrainian and English.

The journal aims at the revitalization of the academic research on the Oriental studies in Ukraine and the development of this field as an important integral part of the Ukrainian humanities. The objective of the journal is to maintain the development of the Oriental studies, to introduce new sources, to promote the latest scientific achievements, to improve the level of the research and to strengthen the academic cooperation in this field. The journal is intended for specialists in Oriental studies, historians, philologists, philosophers, political scientists, religious studies scholars, museologists, university professors and students, and all those interested in the history, languages and cultures of the countries of the Orient and their contacts with Ukraine. The journal is indexed in: Web of Science, Scopus.

== History ==
The World of the Orient was first published in 1927 under the aegis of the All-Ukrainian Scientific Association of Oriental Studies. The last two issues (No. 6 (15) in 1930 and doubled No. 1/2 (16/17) in 1931) were titled The Red Orient. In 1931 the publication was ceased. During this period 17 issues were published. The editorial board of the journal included, in particular, A. Yu. Krymsky, A.P Kovalevsky, P. G. Ritter, and P. G. Tychyna.

In 1993, after a 62-year hiatus, the publication of The World of the Orient was resumed. This was initiated by Omelyan Prytsak, the founder and first director of the A. Yu. Krymskyi Institute of Oriental Studies. The World of the Orient became the main periodical of the institute. Since 1993, authors from 33 countries have contributed to the journal.

In all, more than 120 issues were published from 1927 until present. In contrast with the first issues of the journal, dedicated mostly to economic issues and trade relations of the Soviet Union, in particular the Soviet Ukraine, with the countries of the East, in the restored journal publications on historical topics predominate.

Editors-in-chief:

• J. P. Ryappo (1927–1929)

• O. A. Polotsky (1930–1931)

• O. Yo. Pritsak (1993–2000)

• Yu. M. Kochubey (2001–2009)

• L. V. Matveeva (2009–2012)

• I. V. Otroshchenko (since 2012)

Availability

The issues of the journal (since 2012) are available online, through the main journal website.

Further reading

• Kovalevsky A. (1961), “The Study of the East at the Kharkiv University and Kharkiv in the 18th – 20th Centuries”, in Anthology of Literatures of the East, Edition, introduction and notes by A. P. Kovalevsky, KhSU, Kharkiv, pp. 90–92. (In Ukrainian).

• Rybalkin V. S. (2008), “In what way “Skhidny Svit” was renewed, The World of the Orient, No. 3, pp. 74–76. (In Ukrainian) https://6f842ba7-59af-475f-af8c-16060864257b.filesusr.com/ugd/2c14a4_f43100cb54fe4a1a8b4e7e4d41739919.pdf.

• Tsygankova E. (2007), Oriental Institutions in Ukraine: the Soviet Period, Kritika, Kyiv, pp. 160–163. (In Ukrainian).
