= Nisi (Khazar) =

King of Khazaria

Nisi ben Menasseh or Nisi ben Moses was a Jewish Turkic ruler of the Khazars mentioned in the Khazar Correspondence. He probably reigned in the mid to late 9th century CE. Little is known about his reign. As with other Bulanid rulers, it is unclear whether he was Khagan or Khagan Bek of the Khazars, although the latter is more likely. His son, Aaron ben Nisi, is also mentioned as a Khazar ruler by the same source.

== Sources ==
- Kevin Alan Brook. The Jews of Khazaria. 2nd ed. Rowman & Littlefield Publishers, Inc, 2006.
- Douglas M. Dunlop, The History of the Jewish Khazars, Princeton, N.J.: Princeton University Press, 1954.
- Norman Golb and Omeljan Pritsak, Khazarian Hebrew Documents of the Tenth Century. Ithaca: Cornell Univ. Press, 1982.
