= Kudarkin =

8th-13th century High-ranking official title among the Oghuz Turks

Kudarkin was the title of a high-ranking official among the Oghuz Turks. The title is reported by ibn Fadlan, who passed through Oghuz territory in the early 920s CE. Ibn Fadlan described the Kudarkin as the deputy of the Oghuz yabghu or khan; the position may have been analogous to the Khagan Bek of the Khazars. The Kudarkin's authority was not universally recognized among the Oghuz. When ibn Fadlan was waylaid by an Oghuz tribesman, the Arab emissary attempted to convince tribesman to let him pass by claiming to be a friend of the Kudarkin but was told by the man "I shit on the Kudarkin's beard." Krachkovsky conjectured that the title should actually be read "Kudar-Khan".
