= A. Yu. Krymskyi Institute of Oriental Studies =

Research institute in Kyiv, Ukraine

Coordinates: 50.450813°N 30.528620°E

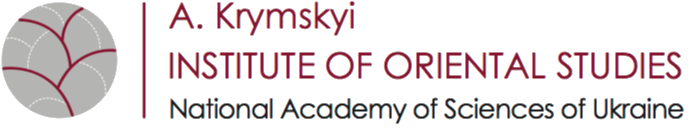
- Established: 22.10.1991
- Address: 4 Hrushevsky Street
- Location: Kyiv, Ukraine
- Website: oriental-studies.org.ua

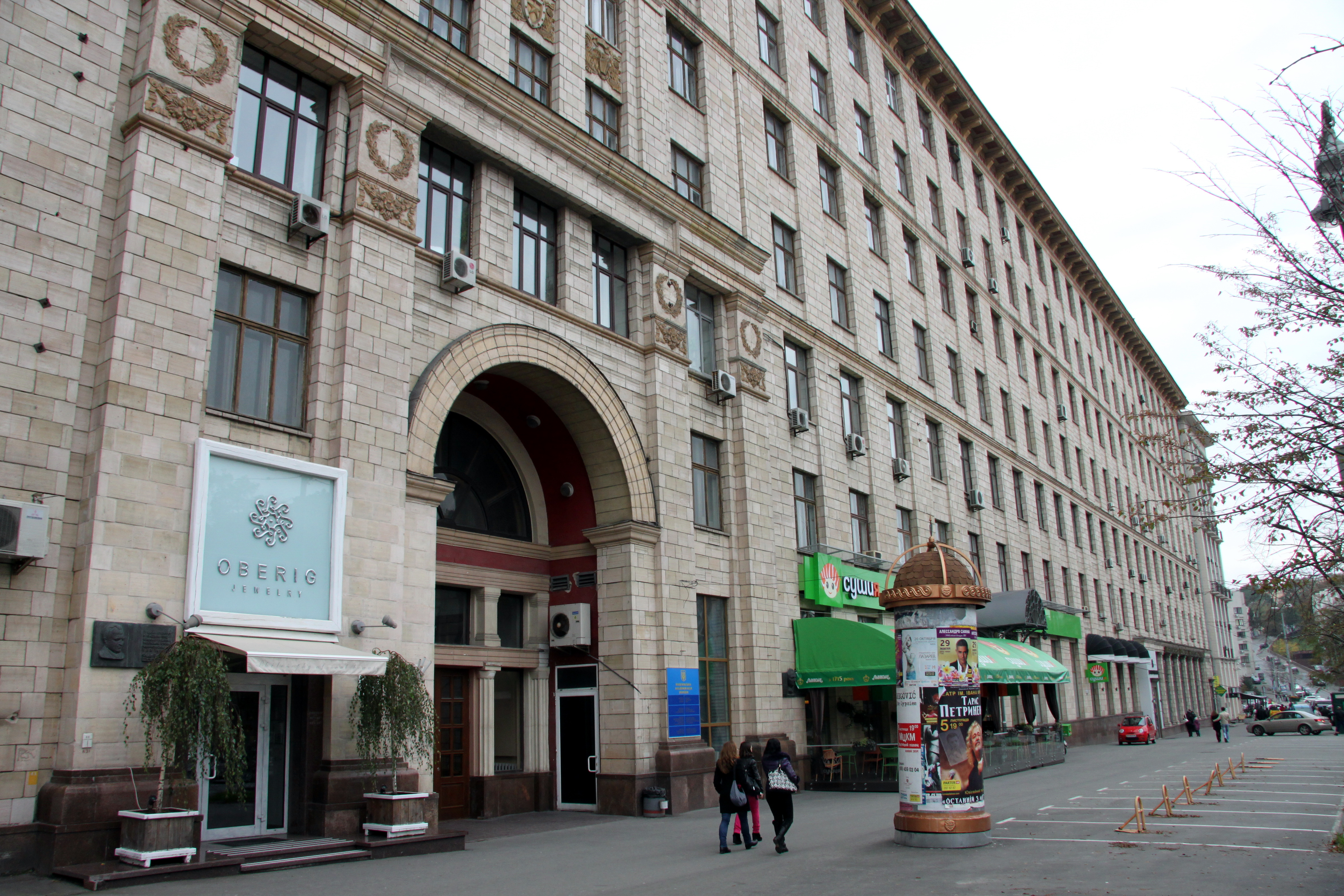
Building of the institute

A.Yu. Krymskyi Institute of Oriental Studies (Ukrainian: Інститут сходознавства імені А. Ю. Кримського, romanized: Instytut skhodoznavstva imeni A. Yu. Krymskoho) is a research institute in Ukraine that is part of the National Academy of Sciences of Ukraine department of history, philosophy and law and studies languages, histories, philosophies, religions, and cultures of peoples of Asia, Near, Middle and Far East, Northern Africa, and ethnicities of oriental origin that have existed or live on the territory of Ukraine. The institute is located in Kyiv.

It is named after Ukrainian orientalist Ahatanhel Krymskyi.

== Directors ==
- 1991 – 1996 Omeljan Pritsak, foreign member
- 1999 – 2012 Lesia Matveyeva
- 2012 – 2013 Danylo Radivilov
- 2014 – 2021 Oleksandr Bogomolov
- 2021 - present Viktor Kiktenko

== Building ==
Beside the Institute of History of Ukraine, the building also houses two other research institutes of the National Academy of Sciences of Ukraine, the Shevchenko Institute of Literature and the Potebnya Institute of Linguistics.

During the events of Euromaidan in winter of 2014, near the building were erected the Hrushevsky Street barricades.

== See also ==
- 2014 Hrushevskoho Street riots
