= Kan of Balhae =

9th King of Balhae (r. 817–818)

- Hangul: 대명충
- Hanja: 大明忠
- RR: Dae Myeongchung
- MR: Tae Myŏngch'ung

Monarch name
- Hangul: 간왕
- Hanja: 簡王
- RR: Ganwang
- MR: Kanwang

Kan (Korean: 간; Hanja: 簡; died 818; r. 817–818) was the ninth king of Balhae. He was the son of the sixth king, Kang, and the younger brother of King Hŭi and Chŏng. He chose the era name T'aesi (태시; 太始; lit. majestic beginning).

== Family ==
- Father: Kang
  - Grandfather: Mun
    - Older brother: Chŏng
    - Older brother: Hŭi
- Wife: Empress Sunmok of the Tae clan (순목황후 태씨; 順穆皇后 泰氏) – No issue.

== See also ==
- List of Korean monarchs
- History of Korea

Kan of Balhae House of Tae Died: 818
Regnal titles
Preceded by Hŭi	King of Balhae; 817–818	Succeeded by Sŏn
