= Who Wrote the Dead Sea Scrolls? =

1995 book by Norman Golb

Who Wrote the Dead Sea Scrolls? The Search for the Secret Of Qumran
- First US edition cover
- Author: Norman Golb
- Cover artist: Erich Hobbing
- Language: English
- Subject: Dead Sea Scrolls, Qumran
- Genre: History, Paleography
- Publisher: Scribner
- Publication date: June 1, 1995
- Publication place: United States
- Media type: Print (Hardback)
- Pages: 446
- ISBN: 978-0-025-44395-2
- OCLC: 31009916

Who Wrote the Dead Sea Scrolls? The Search for the Secret Of Qumran is a book by Norman Golb on the origins of the Dead Sea Scrolls. It takes the stance that the scrolls were not the work of the Essenes (or a group similar to the Essenes) living in the Qumran area, as most scholars think, but were rather written in Jerusalem. Golb hypothesizes the scrolls were moved to Qumran in anticipation of the Roman siege in 70 AD. In Golb's conception, the Scrolls thus represent more the eclectic "mainstream" of Jewish thought, rather than being the work of a splinter group living in the desert and in opposition to the Second Temple hierarchy.

== Summary ==
=== Contents ===
- Part I - A new Theory of Scroll Origins
  1. The Qumran Plateau
  2. The Manuscripts of the Jews
  3. 1947; The First Scroll Discoveries
  4. The Qumran-Essene Theory: A paradigm reconsidered
  5. The Copper Scroll, the Masada manuscripts, and the Siege of Jerusalem
  6. Scroll origins: Rengstorf's Theory and Edmund Wilson's response
- Part II - Science, Politics, and the Dead Sea Scrolls
  1. The Temple Scroll, the Acts of Torah, and the Qumranologists' dilemma
  2. Power Politics and the Collapse of the Scrolls Monopoly
  3. Myth and Science in the World of Qumranology
  4. The deepening Scrolls Controversy
  5. The New York Conference and Some Academic Intrigues
  6. The importance of the Dead Sea Scrolls

== Reception ==
=== Reviews ===
Writing in Church History, Gregory T. Armstrong wrote that "This book is 'must reading' for every historian regardless of her or his period of specialization. It demonstrates how a particular interpretation of an ancient site and particular readings of ancient documents became a straitjacket for subsequent discussion of what is arguably the most widely publicized set of discoveries in the history of biblical archaeology.

Reviewing the British edition of the work, Daniel O'Hara wrote that Golb "gives us much more than just a fresh and convincing interpretation of the origin and significance of the Qumran Scrolls. His book is also — among other things — a fascinating case-study of how an idee fixe, for which there is no real historical justification, has for over 40 years dominated an elite coterie of scholars controlling the Scrolls, who have not only sought to restrict access to those who are prepared to toe their party-line, but have abused and rubbished those 'heretics' who have attempted to place a different interpretation on them."

Publishers Weekly refers to this book as disputing the conventional wisdom that Dead Sea Scrolls related to the communal sect of the Essenes, and that their presumed monastery is actually a Jewish fortress. It also refers to Golb's belief that the "scrolls and related fragmentary manuscripts embody a wide spectrum of doctrines, genres and themes, from a Hebrew hymn by a Jewish nationalist poet to an apocalyptic brotherhood initiation to an inventory of documents stashed away in the Judaean wilderness"

A seminar on the Scrolls dated July 14, 2000, hosted by Australia's ABC Radio National's host Rachael Kohn with Dead Sea Scrolls scholars Geza Vermes, Lawrence Schiffman and Emanuel Tov, refers to this book as "An important dissenting opinion: Golb refuses to accept the 'consensus view' that Qumran was the site of the Essenes sect, and that they owned and wrote the Dead Sea Scrolls, but instead argues that Qumran was a fortress like others in the area and that the library of scrolls was from the Jerusalem Temple." (The book, however, at pp. 159–60, specifically rejects the idea that the scrolls came from the Jerusalem Temple, attributing this theory to Karl Rengstorf and asserting that Rengstorf had failed to "conceive of other libraries in Jerusalem whose owners could equally well have hidden away their contents.")

Craig W. Beard, of the University of Alabama Library, writes in its review that appeared in Library Journal that "Contrary to scholarly consensus, Golb contends that, rather than being the product of sectarian scribes, the Dead Sea Scrolls were the work of individuals from many diverse groups and that they were deposited in the caves near the Dead Sea (among other locations) by Jews fleeing the Roman army during the First Revolt" and that although the book is based in historical, archaeological, and paleographical evidence, "he also lets readers in on his personal efforts to question and oppose the scholarly status quo, leaving the impression of being self-serving."

Ilene Cooper from Booklist suggest that public libraries carry this book for "its provocative assertions."

=== Citations ===
Géza Vermes, wrote in his An Introduction to the Complete Dead Sea Scrolls (2000), that Golb is responsible for "another forceful attack on the common view," an attack which Golb has furthered in several papers since 1980, and which culminated in his book. Vermes asserts that the target of Golb's criticism is the provenance of the manuscripts found at Qumran, his hypothesis being that the manuscripts originated in a Jerusalem library or libraries which were concealed in caves when the capital was besieged by the Romans, and that these manuscripts have nothing to do with Qumran, or with the Essenes.

David Fiensy (2007) cites Golb's book for "the view that the scrolls represent Judaism in general and not a sect", citing A. Dupont-Somer, N. Avigad and E. L. Sukenik, F. M. Cross, D. Flusser, H. Stegemann, G. Vermes, J. Fitzmyer, J.C. VaderKam, Edrdmans, F. G. Martinez, J. H. Charlesworth, and C. M. Murphy for the view that the Qumran sectarian where Essenes, and Schiffman for the view that the scrolls were written by Sadducees.

William Edward Arnal and Michel Robert Desjardins in their Whose Historical Jesus? (1997) cites the book while comparing the different hypotheses on the "Qumranites", citing other scholars such as James H. Charlesworth (Jesus and the Dead Scrolls, 203) who judges that the Qumranites were one of the Essenes groups, and Hartmut Stegemann. "Qumran und das Judentum zur Zeit Jesu" 84 (1994): 175-94 as basing "his support of the Essene hypothesis of factors of hierarch, initiation rites, community of goods, ritual baths, a common meal and views on marriage as well as calendar." They then refer to the alternative estimate of Golb, "that the scrolls came from Jerusalem to a fortress in Qumran during the siege of Jerusalem around 70 CE

== Publication history ==
US editions

- First edition: Scribner, 1995
- Book-of-the-Month Club/History Book Club edition, 1995
- Quality Paperback Book Club edition, 1995
- Touchstone Press paperback edition, 1996

British edition

- Michael O'Mara Books, 1995

E-book edition

- In June 2012, a digital edition appeared on Amazon-Kindle, Google, Barnes & Nobles, Kobo, and other e-book sites. The digital edition includes several supplementary notes and updated bibliographical information concerning research developments since 1995.

Editions in other languages

- German: QUMRAN: Wer schrieb die Schriftrollen von toten Meer?, Hoffmann und Campe Verlag, Hamburg, 1994 (translated by Olga Rinne und Joachim Rehork)
- Dutch: Wie schreef de Dode-Zeerollen?, Tirion Press, 1996 (translated by Lidy Bos)
- French: Qui a écrit les manuscrits de la mer Morte?, Librairies Plon, 1998 (translated by Sonia Kronlund and Lorraine Champromis)
- Portuguese: Quem Escreveu os Manuscritos do Mar Morto?, Imago Editore, 1996 (translated by Sonia de Sousa Moreira)
- Japanese: Shoeisha Publishers, 1998
