= Joseph (Khazar) =

King of Khazaria

Joseph ben Aaron was king of the Khazars during the 950s and 960s. Joseph was the son of Aaron II, a Khazar ruler who defeated a Byzantine-inspired war against Khazaria on numerous fronts. Joseph's wife was the daughter of the king of the Alans.

Whether Joseph was the Khagan or the Bek of the Khazars is uncertain and contested among historians. He describes leading Khazar armies which seems to imply the role of the Bek. However, as he does not refer to a co-ruler in his writings, it is possible that by his time the two-king system had been abandoned altogether (see Khazar Kingship).

Joseph actively sought contact with Jews elsewhere in the diaspora. He corresponded with Hasdai ibn Shaprut, a rabbi in Cordoba, and invited him to visit or settle in Khazaria. He is also mentioned in the Schechter Letter.

Joseph was involved in wars against the Kievan Rus and the Pechenegs, as well as sporadic fighting with the Byzantines in the Crimea. He reported that he was allied with the Muslim states around the Caspian Sea against Varangian marauders from Rus' and Scandinavia.

Joseph's ultimate fate is unknown. As the destruction of the Khazar empire by Sviatoslav I of Kiev occurred soon after his correspondence with Hasdai (in 967 or 969), it is possible that Joseph was ruler during the Khaganate's collapse.

== See also ==
- Bulan (Khazar)
- List of Khazar rulers

== Sources ==
- Kevin Alan Brook. The Jews of Khazaria. 3rd ed. Rowman & Littlefield Publishers, 2018. ISBN 978-1538103425, doi:10.5040/9798881833770
- Douglas M. Dunlop. The History of the Jewish Khazars. Princeton, N.J.: Princeton University Press, 1954.
- Norman Golb and Omeljan Pritsak. Khazarian Hebrew Documents of the Tenth Century. Ithaca: Cornell University Press, 1982. ISBN 0-8014-1221-8
- N. Daniel Korobkin. The Kuzari: In Defense of the Despised Faith. 2nd ed. Feldheim Publishers, 2009. (ISBN 978-1-58330-842-4)
