= Menashe (surname) =

Menashe is a surname. Notable people with the surname include:

- Ari Ben-Menashe (born 1951), Iranian-born Israeli businessman
- Carmela Menashe (born 1949), Israeli journalist
- Doron Menashe, Israeli academic and lawyer
- Eden Ben Menashe (born 1995), Israeli footballer
- Oded Menashe (born 1969), Israeli actor, magician and television presenter
- Samuel Menashe (1925–2011), American poet
- Shalev Menashe (born 1982), Israeli footballer
