= Manasseh I =

King of Khazaria

Menasseh ben Hezekiah was a Turkic ruler of the Khazars, only mentioned in the Khazar Correspondence. He probably reigned in the mid to late ninth century CE. He was the son of Hezekiah, the son of Obadiah. Little is known about his reign. Historical authenticity and accuracy of the only document mentioning his name has been questioned. As with other Bulanid rulers, it is unclear whether he was Khagan or Khagan Bek of the Khazars, although the latter is more likely.

Menasseh was succeeded by his uncle Hanukkah or by Isaac.

== Sources ==
- Kevin Alan Brook. The Jews of Khazaria. 3rd ed. Rowman & Littlefield Publishers, Inc, 2018.
- Douglas M. Dunlop, The History of the Jewish Khazars, Princeton, N.J.: Princeton University Press, 1954.
- Norman Golb and Omeljan Pritsak, Khazarian Hebrew Documents of the Tenth Century. Ithaca: Cornell University Press, 1982.
