= Manasseh II =

Jewish ruler of the Khazars

Menasseh was a hypothetical Jewish ruler of the Khazars mentioned in some extant editions of the Khazar Correspondence (but not others). In the Short Version of King Joseph's Reply he is called Menasheh but in the Long Version the king list instead identifies a king named Mosheh (Moses). In Sefer ha-Ittim, Judah ben Barzillai listed the king's name as Menasheh. He probably reigned in the late ninth century CE. Little is known about his reign. As with other Bulanid rulers, it is unclear whether Menasseh was Khagan or Khagan Bek of the Khazars, although the latter is more likely.

== Sources ==
- Kevin Alan Brook. The Jews of Khazaria. 3rd ed. Rowman & Littlefield Publishers, Inc., 2018.
- Douglas M. Dunlop, The History of the Jewish Khazars, Princeton, N.J.: Princeton University Press, 1954.
- Norman Golb and Omeljan Pritsak, Khazarian Hebrew Documents of the Tenth Century. Ithaca: Cornell University Press, 1982.
- Zuckerman, Constantine (1995). "On the Date of the Khazar's Conversion to Judaism and the Chronology of the Kings of the Rus Oleg and Igor". Revue des études byzantines. 53: 237–270. doi:10.3406/rebyz.1995.1906.
