= Hanukkah (Khazar) =

King of Khazaria

Hanukkah, or Chanina, was a hypothetical Khazar ruler who supposedly reigned during the mid to late ninth century CE. Hanukkah/Chanina was said to be the brother of King Obadiah and to have succeeded his great-nephew Manasseh I to the throne. No contemporary records from his reign survive; however, he is known from the Khazar Correspondence between Hisdai ibn Shaprut and the Khazar king Joseph. Constantin Zuckerman pointed out that the names of Hanukkah and Obadiah do not appear in the list of Khazar kings in Judah ben Barzillai's Sefer ha-Ittim. Scholars believe their omissions raise questions as to whether they really existed.

Hanukkah was succeeded by his son Isaac.

== Sources ==
- Kevin Alan Brook. The Jews of Khazaria. 3rd ed. Rowman & Littlefield Publishers, Inc, 2018. ISBN 978-1-5381-0342-5
- Douglas M. Dunlop, The History of the Jewish Khazars, Princeton, N.J.: Princeton University Press, 1954.
- Norman Golb and Omeljan Pritsak, Khazarian Hebrew Documents of the Tenth Century. Ithaca, N.Y.: Cornell University Press, 1982.
- N. Daniel Korobkin. The Kuzari: In Defense of the Despised Faith. 2nd ed. Feldheim Publishers, 2009. ISBN 978-1-58330-842-4
- Zuckerman, Constantine (1995). "On the Date of the Khazar's Conversion to Judaism and the Chronology of the Kings of the Rus Oleg and Igor". Revue des études byzantines. 53: 237–270. doi:10.3406/rebyz.1995.1906.
