= Doron Menashe =

Researcher and lecturer in the Faculty of Law of the University of Haifa

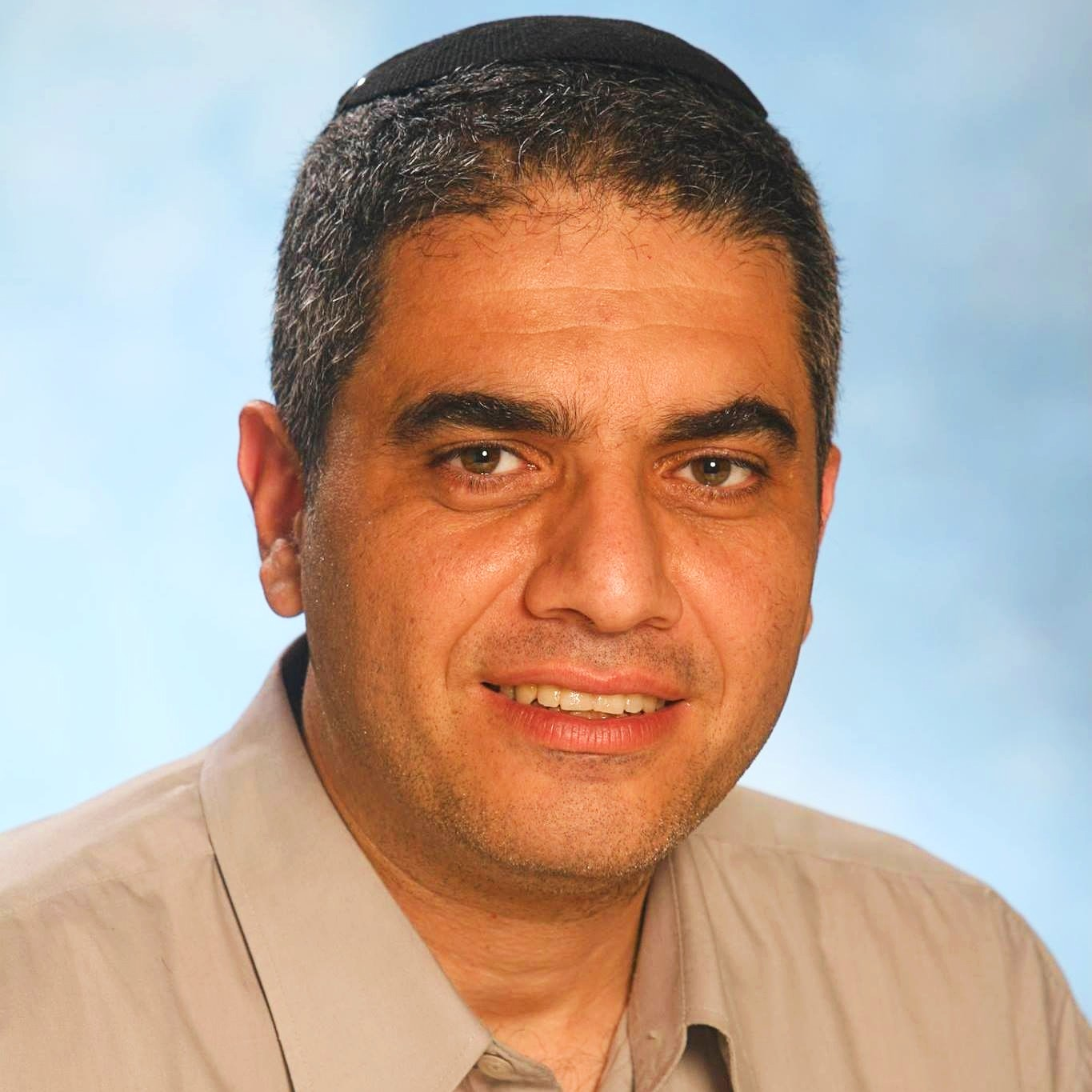
Prof. Doron Menashe

Doron Menashe (Hebrew: דורון מנשה) J.S.D is an associate professor of law, in the Faculty of Law at the University of Haifa, Editor-in-Chief of Haifa Law Review, one of the leading law reviews in Israel, Poet, Mediator and Arbitrator in the Institute of Commercial Arbitration and head of the master's program in adjudication and criminal procedure. He is also a member of the International Society for Therapeutic Jurisprudence.

His field of expertise is Theory of Evidence Law, and he is considered one of the leading experts in the world in this area.

== Biography ==
Doron Menashe was born in Ramat Gan, the middle child of three boys. He was raised and educated in Bnei Brak. Menashe studied at the Bnei Brak Municipal Public High School, excelling in mathematics. After his high school studies, he served in the Israel Defense Forces in a classified intelligence unit.

He completed his undergraduate, master's (summa cum laude) and doctoral studies (with distinction) in law at Tel Aviv University's Faculty of Law. At the same time, he completed a degree summa cum laude in philosophy at the Department of Philosophy of Tel Aviv University. Menashe also has formal university training in mathematics.

Menashe began teaching in the University of Haifa in the year 2000, also lecturing at Tel Aviv University and many colleges across Israel. In addition, in 2006, Menashe founded a unique program in the field of adjudication and criminal procedure for the LL.M degree in the Faculty of Law at the University of Haifa. He has been the academic coordinator of the program since its inception. Over the past few years, he has served as the editor of Israel's first online law journal, He'arat Din and today he is the Editor-in-Chief of Haifa Law Review. Menashe is also a member of the International Society for Therapeutic Jurisprudence.

As a youth, Menashe played football professionally, and since 1980 he has held the Israeli record for ball control with feet (he bounced a soccer ball 22200 on one foot which was considered to be a world best achievement at least back then).

Menashe is a poet (published a poetry book by Salonet) and he is also a member of the Society of Hebrew Writers in the State of Israel as well as a member of Acom, he has won the "Achi" prize for 2023, his poems were often used in court rulings, for example a poem he wrote was quoted in full in an exculpatory decision that dealt with a conflict that arose between worshipers in a synagogue, and his poem "This is the burden" was also quoted in full as part of the dramatic decision acquitting the police officer who caused the death of Salomon Teke, he also operates a YouTube channel.

In his personal life, Menashe is Jewish (religious), living in Ramat Gan, married to Ora Menashe, and the father of five.

== Publications ==
Doron Menashe's articles have been published in the most prestigious professional journals in the area of evidence and procedure, including The Berkley Press, Oxford University Commonwealth Law Journal, International Community Law, International Commentary on Evidence, Criminal Law Quarterly, The International Journal of Evidence and Proof, Criminal Justice and Behavior, San Diego, Pennsylvania, North Dakota, Yeshiva University, Buffalo etc. Menashe's articles were also published in Australia, Italy (translated to Italian) and in China (translated to Chinese).

Menashe is on the editorial board of one of the most prominent periodicals in the world specializing in evidence, International Commentary on Evidence, and Law Probability & Risk (Oxford).

Doron Menashe's writing is often cited by the Supreme Court of Israel. Among other things, He appeared as a prominent legal expert in evidence law on the true-crime Israeli documentary television series Shadow of Truth That was subsequently sold by the producers to Netflix

== Philosophy and research ==
The main thrust of Doron Menashe's research is the theory of evidentiary law, an area which suffers from a relative lack of professional analysis. In his writing, Doron Menashe integrates theoretical-fundamental perspectives with practical-applicatory perspectives.

Doron Menashe's writing is analytical, dealing with the clarification of concepts and logical aspects of the rules of evidence, including mathematical analysis of rules, the application of economic principles to law and specifically in the context of incentives for disclosure of information.

In addition, Doron Menashe has special expertise in forms of evidence which relate to specific areas of law, such as forensic evidence in criminal proceedings, bribery cases and white-collar crimes in general (see his articles about the Aryeh Deri case and the Holy Land case against Ehud Olmert); and in the context of science and health, specifically in the context of proving mass injuries due to the danger of exposure to toxins (toxic torts).

(See his critical evaluation of the Report of the Government Investigation Committee on the Results of Military Activities in the Kishon River and the Surrounding Water on the Health of IDF Soldiers.)

In addition, Menashe writes expansively about areas beyond the rules of evidence, for example the place that the element of mercy should play in judging and sentencing.

His writings also deal with the nature of judicial proof, He also analyzes the objectives of the rules of evidence in a criminal trial, He also dissects the basic conceptualization of the rules of evidence such as probative value, admissibility, suppressed evidence, levels of proof.

In addition, he formulates decision-making strategies for determining findings of fact.

He addresses the theoretical and practical difficulties in identifying suspects, He also writes about applying the economic approach of law to rules of evidence.

== Objectives of rules of evidence ==
As opposed to the traditional-formalistic approach to the rules of evidence, according to which the point of the rules of evidence is to reveal the truth, Doron Menashe sees in the rules of evidence a domain in which various principles apply, which may come into conflict with one another, revealing the truth being just one of them. In addition to revealing the truth, the rules of evidence seek to protect the innocent, and this principle imposes limitations on the principle of finding the truth.

Simply put, the principle of finding the truth yields epistemological consideration, while the principle of protecting the innocent yields normative considerations; thus, the rules of evidence are dominated by both epistemological considerations and normative considerations, whereas the normative considerations delimit the parameters of the application of epistemological considerations.

The normative considerations produce the risk-of-error allocation of criminal proceedings, through which Menashe develops a concept called "decision-making strategy."

== Risk-of-error allocation ==
In criminal trials, allocations of risk of error must reflect a balance between the principle of protecting the innocent and the public interest of criminal law enforcement. Since the normative considerations justify a particularly strong defense of the principle of protecting the innocent, so that convicting the innocent is considered more serious than vindicating the guilty, this demands an unequal risk-of-error allocation, so that a higher risk is justified for an erroneous vindication and a lower risk, if possible, for an erroneous conviction. The risk of wrongful conviction must be as low as possible, one step removed from making criminal law enforcement utterly infeasible.

This allocation of risk-of-error is applicable throughout the judicial proceeding, not only at the time of the verdict being issued at its conclusion. In this, Doron Menashe disputes the approach of Larry Laudan, who is of the opinion that, aside from the stage of final decision, the only consideration which is relevant is the epistemological consideration of maximizing the discovery of the truth.

Doron Menashe's approach in these contexts dovetails with that of the prominent expert on evidence, Alex Stein.

On the other hand, in civil law, Menashe sees as justified the equal allocation of risks of error, based on the principle of offering equal protection to the plaintiffs and to the respondents.

== Decision-making strategy ==
Decision-making strategy is a term for the outline which should manage judicial discretion when coming to conclusions in judicial proceedings. In other words, the main objective is to provide the court with general guidelines according to which it should reach its specific verdict.

Decision-making strategy may be determined by the legislature through lawmaking or by the court itself through precedent. Decision-making strategy may exist in the context of procedure and the rules of evidence. In this context, when the decision-making strategy is determined by the court, the court does not play a passive role in using the rules of procedure and evidence, but rather an active role, as even before the specific verdict has been reached, it considers the resolution of the question of decision-making strategy.

Decision-making strategy must accommodate the objectives of the stated judicial context. Thus, one must distinguish between criminal decision-making strategy and civil decision-making strategy.

Criminal decision-making strategy must reflect the objective of criminal procedure and rules of law; more generally speaking, it must reflect the objectives of criminal justice on the whole. As mentioned above, these objectives are the enforcement of criminal law, protecting the innocent and finding the truth.

Decision-making strategy may be the strategy of the verdict at the conclusion of the legal proceedings. Menashe defines this strategy as personal or circumscribed strategy. In this case, to the extent that the decision is factual, the decision-making strategy relates to the level of proof and its application.

However, the discussion is not limited to the verdict. Decision-making strategy also pertains to conclusions and choices made throughout the trial before the verdict, expanding and applying at every juncture of judicial decision throughout the proceedings which may influence the allocation of risks of error during the trial, particularly the level of risk of the innocent being convicted. These decisions may touch on the weight of evidence; interpreting the rules which dictate the admissibility or sufficiency of evidence; applying judicial discretion to those matters which are not explicitly addressed in the law, et cetera. Menashe refers to this strategy as general criminal decision-making strategy.

In criminal law, decision-making strategy, whether general or specific, must reflect the goal of maximizing the protection of innocent, up to the edge of making it impossible to enforce criminal law with reasonable effectiveness. In terms of allocating risks of error, one must allocate, as much as possible, the risks of error to the state (running the risk of vindicating the guilty) to the level that any further risk allocation would make reasonable enforcement of the law impossible. From this point onward, the risks of error may be allocated to the defendant (the risk of convicting the innocent).

Thus, Doron Menashe offers a unique approach, unlike other modes of thought, such as the Bayesian-Pascalian approach, Jonathan Cohen's inductive reasoning, or Ronald Allen's narrative approach.

On the other hand, the decision-making strategy in civil law reflects an allocation of risk of error which is equivalent between plaintiffs and respondents, between errors based on accepting that which should have been rejected and those based on rejecting that which should have been accepted. Similarly, there is equivalency between an overly stingy assessment and an overly generous assessment.

== Published books ==
- Doron Menashe The Logic of Admissibility of Evidence (The Magnes Press and the University of Haifa Press, 2009) [337 pp] [Hebrew].
- Doron Menashe, E. Gruner, Reasonable Doubt in Criminal Procedure, (Nevo, 2017) [Hebrew].
- Doron Menashe A Theory of Evidence Law (Editor: Guy Itzhak Sender, Perlstien-Genosar Press, 2017) - A compilation of some of my Hebrew-language articles rearranged as book chapters [Hebrew].
- Doron Menashe The Epistemology of Evidence Law (LAP LAMBERT Academic Publishing, Guy Itzhak Sender Editor, 2020) [English].
- Doron Menashe, E. Gruner A retrial, and the test case of Zadorov affair, (Nevo Press, 2021) [Hebrew].
- Doron Menashe Polygraph Tests as Evidence in Criminal Court (Guy Itzhak Sender Editor, Hakodesh Press, 2022) [English].
- Doron Menashe Between me and his place, Poetry (Lily Perry Editor, Salonet-Totem Publishers, 2022) [Hebrew].
- Doron Menashe, Gavriel Hazut Words for Shabbat - Short articles about Weekly Torah portion (Tam Publishers, 2024) [Hebrew].
- Doron Menashe, Avishag Pomernatz The burden of proof in the criminal procedure (Nevo Press, 2024) [Hebrew].
