= Kang of Balhae =

6th King of Balhae (r. 794–809)

- Hangul: 대숭린
- Hanja: 大嵩璘
- RR: Dae Sungrin
- MR: Tae Sungnin

Monarch name
- Hangul: 강왕
- Hanja: 康王
- RR: Gangwang
- MR: Kangwang

Kang (Korean: 강; Hanja: 康; died 809) was the sixth king of Balhae, ascending to the throne in 794 and ruling until his death. He was the son of King Mun, who was Balhae's third king. He chose the era name Chŏngnyŏk (정역; 正曆; lit. upright policy). During his reign, there was active trade with Japan and Tang China, and missions passed frequently among the three states.

== Family ==
- Father: King Mun
  - Grandfather: King Mu
- Unnamed wife
  - Son?: Tae Ch'ŏngyun (대청윤; 大淸允)
  - Son?: Tae Nŭngsin (대능신; 大能信)
  - 1st son: King Chŏng (정왕 대원유; 定王 大元瑜)
  - 2nd son: King Hŭi (희왕 대언의; 僖王 大言義)
  - 3rd son: King Kan (간왕 대명충; 簡王 大明忠)

== See also ==
- List of Korean monarchs
- History of Korea

Kang of Balhae House of Tae Died: 809
Regnal titles
| Preceded by Sŏng | King of Balhae; 794–809 | Succeeded by Chŏng |
