= Haifa Law Review =

The Haifa Law Review
- Discipline: Law review
- Language: English, Hebrew
- Edited by: Ronen Perry

Publication details
- History: 2004-present
- Publisher: University of Haifa (Israel)
- Frequency: Biannually

Standard abbreviations
- ISO 4: Haifa Law Rev.

Indexing
- ISSN: 0792-8521
- OCLC no.: 242723540

Links
- Journal homepage

The Haifa Law Review (Hebrew: דין ודברים, Din U'Dvarim) is a peer-reviewed law review with an interdisciplinary orientation, published by the University of Haifa Faculty of Law. It was established in 2004 by Sandy Kedar, who served as its first editor-in-chief. It is currently edited by Ronen Perry. The editor-in-chief is always a faculty member, whereas the editorial board consists of 10-15 law students. Students are offered positions based on their first-year grades and performance.

The journal publishes two issues each year. Unsolicited submissions go through a two-stage review process: a preliminary in-house screening and external peer review. From time to time the journal publishes symposium issues, focusing on specific topics like law and geography, intellectual property and competition law, law and humanities, methodologies and perspectives in legal research, and others. The journal also publishes in-depth interviews with retired justices of the Supreme Court of Israel.
