= Benjamin (Khazar) =

King of Khazaria

Benjamin was a Khazar ruler, probably the bek, who is mentioned in the Schechter Text and the Khazar Correspondence. He was the son of the Khazar ruler Menahem and probably reigned in the late ninth or early tenth century CE. He was succeeded by his son, Aaron II.

== Reign ==
The only extant account of Benjamin's reign appears in the Schechter Text. According to its anonymous author, Benjamin's Khazars fought a war against a coalition of five nations identified in the text as 'SY, TWRQY, 'BM, and PYYNYL, which were reportedly instigated and aided by MQDWN. The term "MQDWN", or Macedon, is used in medieval Jewish documents to refer to the Eastern Roman Empire, especially during the Macedonian dynasty (867-1025). "TWRQY" has been identified with the Oghuz, who lived on Khazaria's eastern frontier.

The other names are more uncertain. In Khazarian Hebrew Documents of the Tenth Century, Omeljan Pritsak argued that "PYYNYL" should be read as "PTzNYK", or Pecheneg, attributing the error to damage or degradation in the manuscript. He identified 'SY with the Asya, whom he associated with the Burtas(traditionally allies of the Khazars), and 'BM with remnants of the Onogurs and Bulgars living in the Pontic steppe.

The Schechter Text identifies the Alans as Benjamin's only allies in the war and states that many Alans had adopted Judaism by that time. Some scholars have interpreted the term "Asya" as a reference to the Arsiyah, which has led to suggestions that the conflict may have involved a Muslim revolt or attempted coup against Benjamin.

The Schechter Text identifies the Alans as Benjamin's only allies in this war, stating that many of the Alans had adopted Judaism by that time.

== Bibliography ==
- Brook, Kevin Alan (2018). The Jews of Khazaria (3rd ed.). Rowman & Littlefield.
- Dunlop, Douglas M. (1954). The History of the Jewish Khazars. Princeton, New Jersey: Princeton University Press.
