= Hŭi of Balhae =

8th King of Balhae (r. 812–817)

- Hangul: 대언의
- Hanja: 大言義
- RR: Dae Eonui
- MR: Tae Ŏnŭi

Monarch name
- Hangul: 희왕
- Hanja: 僖王
- RR: Huiwang
- MR: Hŭiwang

Hŭi (Korean: 희; Hanja: 僖; died 817; r. 812?–817) was the eighth king of Balhae. He was the son of King Kang, and the younger brother of King Chŏng. He actively cultivated relations with Tang China, and imported many aspects of Tang culture and governmental systems, and sent Buddhist statues to Tang in 814. He married and had a son named Tae Yŏnjun (대연준). The king used chujak (주작; 朱雀) as his Korean era name.

== See also ==
- List of Korean monarchs
- History of Korea

Hŭi of Balhae House of Tae Died: 817
Regnal titles
Preceded by Chŏng	King of Balhae; 812–817	Succeeded by Kan
