= Chŏng of Balhae =

7th King of Balhae (r. 809–812)

- Hangul: 대원유
- Hanja: 大元瑜
- RR: Dae Wonyu
- MR: Tae Wŏnyu

Monarch name
- Hangul: 정왕
- Hanja: 定王
- RR: Jeongwang
- MR: Chŏngwang

Chŏng (Korean: 정; Hanja: 定; died 812?; r. 809–812?) was the seventh king of Balhae. He was the son of King Kang. Little is known of his reign, save that he chose the era name Yŏngdŏk (영덕; 永德; lit. eternal virtue). After his death, his brother succeeded him as King Hŭi. He married and had a son named Tae Yŏnjin (대연진).

== See also ==
- List of Korean monarchs
- History of Korea

Chŏng of Balhae House of Tae Died: 809
Regnal titles
| Preceded by Kang | King of Balhae; 794–809 | Succeeded by Hŭi |
