= Zachariah (Khazar) =

King of Khazaria

- Khagan of Khazaria
- Reign: 860s
- Religion: Tengrism, Judaism

Zachariah, or Zacharias, was a Khagan of the Khazars who was reported in the account of St. Cyril. The start and end dates of his reign are unknown but he was khagan during Cyril's visit to Khazaria in 861. In Vita Constantini, Cyril's biographer claimed that Khagan Zacharias wrote a letter to the emperor of the Byzantine Empire in which he pledged his country's continued friendship and said that individual Khazars were allowed to convert to Christianity and that he might himself convert later because Cyril had supposedly convinced him that it was the true faith.
