= Georgius Tzul =

Khazar warlord

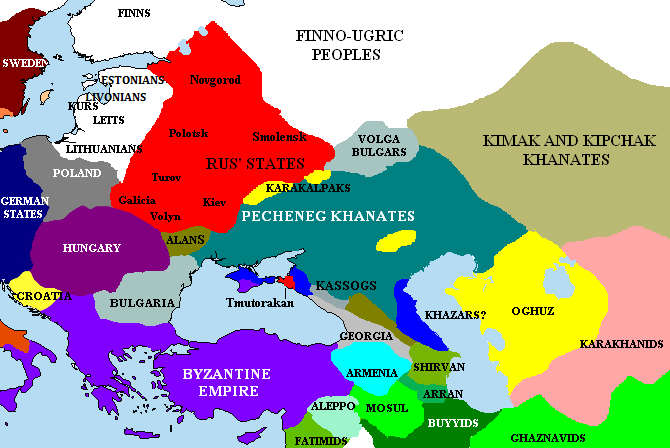
The Pontic steppes, c. 1015. The areas in blue are those possibly still under Khazar control.

Georgius Tzul (also Georgios; Greek: Γεώργιος Τζούλης) was a Khazar warlord against whom the Byzantine Empire and Mstislav of Tmutarakan launched a joint expedition in 1016.

He appears only in the account of the Byzantine court historians Kedrenos and John Skylitzes, who place him at Kerch and calls him "khagan" (the title of the Khazar rulers). Kedrenos states that he was captured by the expeditionary force but does not relate his ultimate fate. Inscriptions and other references exist referring to a Tzul or Tsal clan in Crimea during this period; presumably he was a member although the relationship of that family to the original ruling dynasty of Khazaria is unknown. Almost nothing else about him, including the extent of his holdings, is known.

Even though earlier writers maintained that the Khazar khagan was required to adhere to Judaism, Georgius is a Christian name. Whether Georgius Tzul was himself a Christian, a Jew or Shamanist with an unusual Greek name, or whether the name is merely a Byzantine attempt to transliterate a Turkic or Hebrew name, is unknown.

Byzantine campaigns occurred roughly during this period against the Georgians and the Bulgarian Empire, suggesting a concerted effort to re-establish Byzantine dominance in the Black Sea region.

== Sources ==
- Kevin Alan Brook. The Jews of Khazaria. 3rd ed. Lanham, MD: Rowman & Littlefield Publishers, 2018. ISBN 9781538103425
- Douglas M. Dunlop. The History of the Jewish Khazars. Princeton, N.J.: Princeton University Press, 1954.
- Thomas S. Noonan. "The Khazar-Byzantine World of the Crimea in the Early Middle Ages: The Religious Dimension." Archivum Eurasiae Medii Aevi vol. 10 (1998–1999): pages 207–230. ISSN 0724-8822.
- Boris Zhivkov. Khazaria in the 9th and 10th Centuries. Leiden: Brill Academic Publishers, 2015. ISBN 9789004293076
