= Khagan Bek =

Khagan Bek is the title used by the bek (generalissimo) of the Khazars.

== History ==
Khazar kingship was divided between the Khagan and the Bek or Khagan Bek. Contemporary Arab historians related that the Khagan was purely a spiritual ruler or figurehead with limited powers, while the Bek was responsible for administration and military affairs.

In the Khazar Correspondence, King Joseph identifies himself as the ruler of the Khazars and makes no reference to a colleague. It has been disputed whether Joseph was a Khagan or a Bek; his description of his military campaigns make the latter probable. A third option is that by the time of the Correspondence (c. 950–960) the Khazars had merged the two positions into a single ruler, or that the Beks had somehow supplanted the Khagans or vice versa.

Some sources refer to the Khazar Bek as ishad (a Göktürk military rank) or Malik (Arabic for "king", also used as a high rank). He was theoretically the subordinate of the Khagan but in reality controlled the military and civil government for the Khazar khaganate.

== See also ==
- Beg, Bey
- Khan
- Beg Khan
