= Norman Golb =

American historian (1928–2020)

Norman Golb (15 January 1928 – 29 December 2020) was a scholar of Jewish history and the Ludwig Rosenberger Professor in Jewish History and Civilization at the Oriental Institute of the University of Chicago.

== Life ==
Golb was born in Chicago, Illinois, United States, on 15 January 1928 to Joseph and Rose Golb, child immigrants from Ukraine.

Golb studied at Wright Junior College in Chicago, now Wilbur Wright College, and then at Roosevelt College (now Roosevelt University). He earned his PhD from Johns Hopkins University in 1954. While a student he held fellowships to undertake studies at Dropsie College in Philadelphia and another that ended up with him spending from 1955-1957 studying at the Hebrew University of Jerusalem.

He joined the faculty of the Hebrew Union College, Cincinnati in 1958 before settling at the University of Chicago, where he worked from 1963. Golb has also been a visiting scholar at the University of Wisconsin (1957–58), Harvard University (1966), and Tel Aviv University (1969–70).

Golb was a proponent of the viewpoint that the Dead Sea Scrolls found in Qumran were not the product of the Essenes, but rather of many different Jewish sects and communities of ancient Israel, which he presents in his book Who Wrote The Dead Sea Scrolls?: The Search For The Secret Of Qumran. In the 1990s, Golb was an advocate for loosening restrictions on examination of the Scrolls by general scholars.

Golb was the discoverer, in 1962, of the Kievan Letter, the earliest document attesting to Jewish habitation of Kyiv. He also identified Obadiah the Proselyte as the author of the oldest known manuscript of Hebrew music (12th century), the earliest extant legal record of the Jews of Sicily, a new document dealing with the First Crusade and new manuscript materials relating to the Jews of Rouen. Finally, he recovered a genizah document describing a European convert to Judaism (11th century) and an original manuscript of the Khazars.

Golb died in Chicago on 29 December 2020 aged 92.

== Family ==
Golb's son is Raphael Golb. Raphael went on a campaign of email harassment against academics perceived as being insufficiently receptive to his father's ideas, in particular targeting professor of Jewish studies Lawrence Schiffman. This included emails written by Raphael claiming to be from Schiffman "confessing" to have stolen Norman Golb's work. This eventually led to the case of People v. Golb where Raphael was criminally prosecuted for identity theft, criminal impersonation, and forgery.

== Selected bibliography ==
- (1998) The Jews in medieval Normandy: A social and intellectual history New York: Cambridge University Press. ISBN 978-0521580328
- (1997) Judaeo-Arabic studies: proceedings of the Founding Conference of the Society for Judaeo-Arabic Studies Amsterdam: Harwood Academic Publishers. (Conference Proceedings from the Founding Conference of the Society for Judaeo-Arabic Studies)
- (1995) Who wrote the Dead Sea scrolls?: The search for the secret of Qumran New York: Scribner.
- (1994) "The Dead Sea Scrolls and the Ethics of Museology" (Journal Article in The Aspen Institute quarterly: AQ : issues and arguments for leaders )
- (1992) "The Freeing of the Scrolls and Its Aftermath" (Journal Article in The Qumran chronicle)
- (1992) "The Qumran–Essene Hypothesis: A Fiction of Scholarship" (Journal Article in The Christian century)
- (1990) "Khirbet Qumran and the Manuscripts of the Judaean Wilderness: Observations on the Logic of their Investigation" (Journal Article in Journal of Near Eastern studies)
- (1989) "The Dead Sea Scrolls: A New Perspective" (Journal Article in The American scholar)
- (1985) Les Juifs de Rouen au Moyen Age: Portrait d'une culture oubliée Rouen: Université de Rouen. (Book in the series Publications de l’Université de Rouen )
- (1984) "A Marriage Document from Wardunia de-Baghdad" (Journal Article in Journal of Near Eastern studies)
- (1982) with Omeljan Pritsak: Khazarian Hebrew documents of the tenth century Ithaca: Cornell University Press.
- (1980) "The Problem of Origin and Identification of the Dead Sea Scrolls" (Journal Article in Proceedings of the American Philosophical Society held at Philadelphia for promoting useful knowledge)
- (1976) Toledot hayehudim be'ir rouen bimé habenayim Tel Aviv, Israel: Dvir Publishing House.
- (1973) A Judaeo–Arabic Court Document of Syracuse, A.D. 1020 (Journal Article in Journal of Near Eastern studies )
- (1972) Spertus College of Judaica Yemenite manuscripts Chicago: Spertus College of Judaica Press.
- (1967) The Music of Obadiah the Proselyte and his Conversion (Journal Article in The Journal of Jewish studies)
- (1965) Notes on the Conversion of Prominent European Christians to Judaism During the Eleventh Century (Journal Article in The Journal of Jewish studies)
- (1957) "Literary and Doctrinal Aspects of the Damascus Covenant in the Light of Karaite Literature" (Journal Article in The Jewish Quarterly Review: New Series)
- (1957) "Sixty Years of Genizah Research" (Journal Article in Judaism)

== Resources ==
- Faculty homepage
