= Douglas Morton Dunlop =

British orientalist (1909–1987)

Douglas Morton Dunlop (1909–1987) was a renowned British orientalist and scholar of Islamic and Eurasian history.

== Early life and education ==
Born in England, Dunlop studied at Bonn and Oxford under the historian Paul Ernst Kahle (1875–1965). His work was also influenced by such scholars as Zeki Validi Togan, Mikhail Artamonov, and George Vernadsky. His uncle was B. K. Cunningham, an Anglican priest and academic.

== Career ==
In the 1950s and 1960s, Dunlop was Professor of History at Columbia University in New York. He is best known for his influential histories of Arab civilization and the Khazar Khaganate. Dunlop was the "most esteemed scholar of the Khazar monarchy." He had command of the many languages needed to study the Khazars, information about whom is found in Arabic, Byzantine, Hebrew and Chinese literature.

== Representative publications ==
=== As author ===
- "The Arabic Tradition of the Summa Alexandrinorum", in Archives d'histoire doctrinale et littéraire du moyen âge, 1982
- Arab civilization to A.D. 1500 London: Longman, 1971.
- Arab civilization to A.D. 1500, New York: Praeger, 1971.
- The History of the Jewish Khazars, New York: Schocken Books, 1967.
- "The Khazars." The Dark Ages: Jews in Christian Europe, 711–1096. 1966.
- "The Translations of al-Bitrîq and Yahyâ (Yuhannâ) b. al-Bitrîq", in Journal of the Royal Asiatic Society of Great Britain and Ireland, 1959
- Dunlop, Douglas M.. (1957) "Sources of Gold and Silver in Islam according to al-Hamdani (10th Century AD)", in Studia Islamica
- "Philosophical Predecessors and Contemporaries of Ibn Bâjjah", in The Islamic Quarterly, 1955
- "Aspects of the Khazar Problem", in Transactions of the Glasgow University Oriental Society, 1951.
- "Ibn Bajjah's 'Tadbîru l-Mutawahhid'", in Journal of the Royal Asiatic Society of Great Britain & Ireland, 1945.
- "The Karaits of East Asia", in Bulletin of the School of Oriental and African Studies, University of London, 1944.
- "Muḥammad b. Mūsā al-Khwārizmī", in Journal of the Royal Asiatic Society of Great Britain & Ireland, 1943.
- "The Dhunnunids of Toledo", in Journal of the Royal Asiatic Society of Great Britain & Ireland, 1942.

=== As translator ===
- Abu Mashar al-Balkhi, Jafar Ibn Muhammad. (1971) The Mudhâkarât fî'Ilm an-Nujûm (Dialogues on Astrology) Attributed to Abû Ma'shar al Balkhî (Albumasar) (Book Chapter in Iran and Islam: in memory of the late Vladimir Minorsky)
- al-Farabi, Abu Nasr Mohammad Ibn al-Farakh. (1961) Fusul al-Madani: Aphorisms of the Statesman Cambridge: Cambridge University Press.
- al-Farabi, Abu Nasr Mohammad Ibn al-Farakh. (1959) "Al-Farabi's Paraphrase of the Categories of Aristotle [Part 2]". The Islamic quarterly pp. 21–54
- al-Farabi, Abu Nasr Mohammad Ibn al-Farakh. (1957) "Al-Farabi's Paraphrase of the Categories of Aristotle [Part 1]" The Islamic quarterly pp. 168–197
- al-Farabi, Abu Nasr Mohammad Ibn al-Farakh. (1956) "Al-Farabi's Introductory Risalah on Logic" The Islamic quarterly pp. 224–235
- al-Farabi, Abu Nasr Mohammad Ibn al-Farakh. (1956) "Al-Farabi's Eisagoge" The Islamic quarterly pp. 117–138
- al-Farabi, Abu Nasr Mohammad Ibn al-Farakh. (1955) "Al-Farabi's Introductory Sections on Logic" The Islamic quarterly pp. 264–282
- al-Farabi, Abu Nasr Mohammad Ibn al-Farakh. (1952) "Al-Farabi's Aphorisms of the Statesman" (Journal Article in Iraq (London) ) pp. 93–117
- al-Farabi, Abu Nasr Mohammad Ibn al-Farakh. (1951) "The Existence and Definition of Philosophy / From an Arabic text ascribed to al-Farabi" (Journal Article in Iraq (London) pp. 76–93)
