= Omeljan Pritsak =

Ukrainian-American history professor (1919–2006)

Professor Omeljan Pritsak
- Омелян Пріцак
- Omeljan Pritsak at the Ottoman documents and the Black Sea region colloquium in March 1981.
- Born: 7 April 1919; Luka, Sambir County, West Ukrainian People's Republic
- Died: 29 May 2006 (aged 87); Boston, Massachusetts, U.S.
- Citizenship: American
- Occupations: academic; professor; historian; linguist; medievalist
- Known for: First Mykhailo Hrushevsky Professor of Ukrainian History at Harvard University, founder and first director of the Harvard Ukrainian Research Institute, founder of the journal Harvard Ukrainian Studies, founder of the Oriental Institute of the National Academy of Sciences in Kyiv, founder of the journal Skhidnyi svit (The Oriental World)

Academic background
- Education: University of Lviv; University of Berlin; University of Göttingen
- Doctoral advisor: Annemarie von Gabain
- Influences: Roman Jakobson, Vyacheslav Lypynsky, Ahatanhel Krymsky

Academic work
- Discipline: Oriental studies, Slavic studies, Ukrainian studies
- Institutions: University of Hamburg; University of Washington; Harvard University
- Main interests: Oriental, especially Turkic, sources for the history of Kyivan Rus'
- Notable works: The Origin of Rus'

Omeljan Yosypovych Pritsak (Ukrainian: Омелян Йосипович Пріцак; 7 April 1919 – 29 May 2006) was the first Mykhailo Hrushevsky Professor of Ukrainian History at Harvard University and the founder and first director (1973–1989) of the Harvard Ukrainian Research Institute.

== Career ==
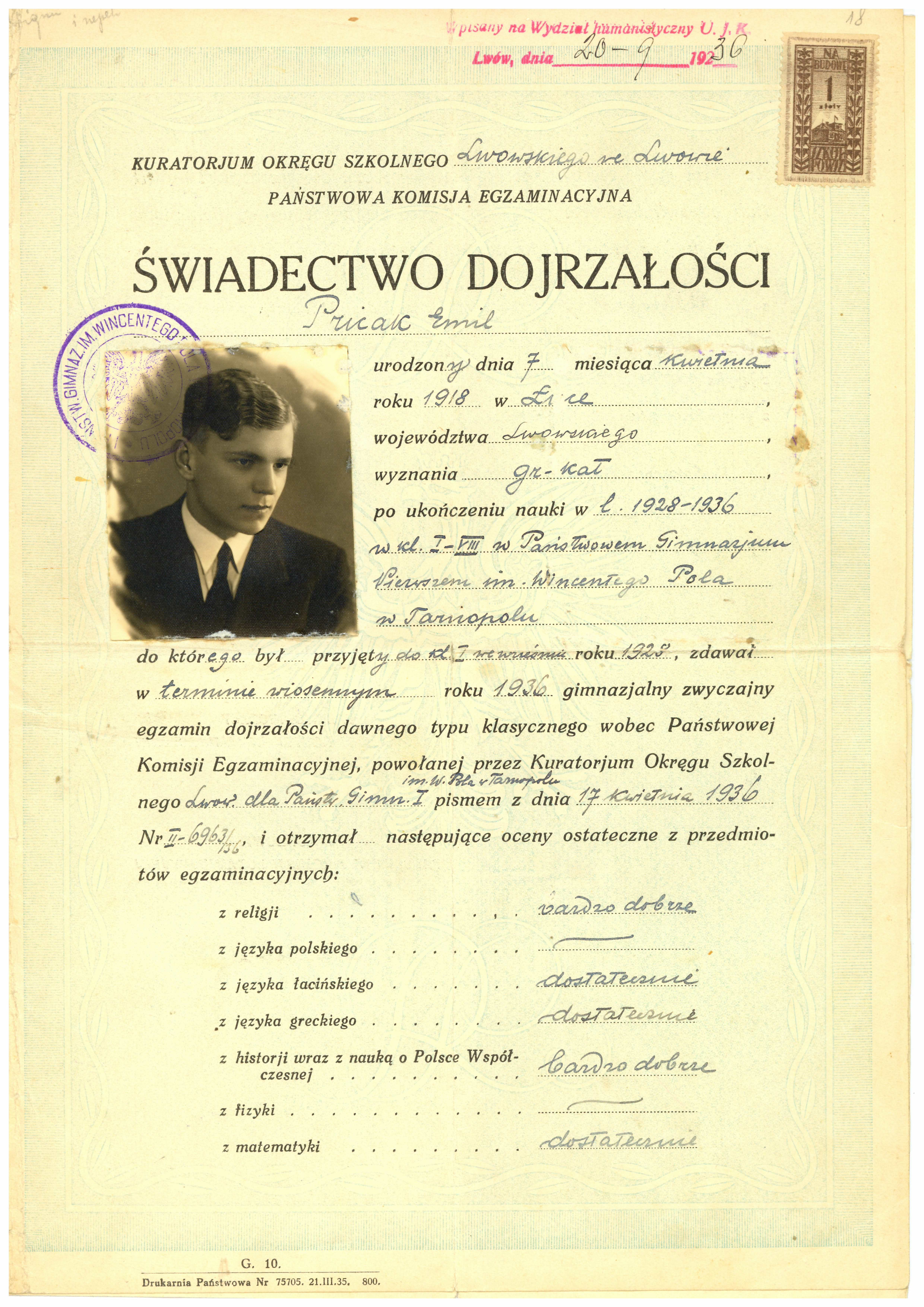
Pritsak's matura certificate (1936)

From 1921 to 1936 he lived in Ternopil, where he graduated the state Polish gymnasium. Pritsak began his academic career at the University of Lviv in interwar Poland where he studied Middle Eastern languages under local orientalists and became associated with the Shevchenko Scientific Society and attended its seminar on Ukrainian history led by Ivan Krypiakevych. After the Soviet annexation of Galicia, he moved to Kyiv where he briefly studied with the premier Ukrainian orientalist, Ahatanhel Krymsky. During World War II, Pritsak was taken to the west as a Ostarbeiter. Following the war, he studied at the universities in Berlin and Göttingen, receiving a doctorate from the latter, before teaching at the University of Hamburg.

During his European period, Pritsak initiated the establishment of the International Association of Ural – Altaic Studies. In 1958–1965, he served as its President and Editor-in-Chief of the Ural–Altaische Jahrbücher in 1954–1960.

In the 1960s, he moved to the United States, where he taught at the University of Washington for a while, before moving to Harvard at the invitation of the prominent linguist, Roman Jakobson, who was interested in proving the authenticity of the twelfth century "Song of Igor" through the use of oriental sources.

In 1973, he founded the Harvard Ukrainian Research Institute at Harvard. Two years later, he became the first Mykhailo Hrushevsky Professor of Ukrainian History (1975). In 1977 he started the journal, Harvard Ukrainian Studies.

In 1988 he cofounded the International Association of Ukrainianists, established in Naples and became its Executive Board member and Head of Archeographic Commission.

In 1989, he retired from his Harvard professorship. After the emergence of an independent Ukraine in 1991, Pritsak returned to Kyiv, where he founded the Oriental Institute of the National Academy of Sciences and became its first Director (since 1999 – Honorary Director). Also, he re-established the journal Skhidnyi svit (The World of the Orient). Pritsak spent his final years back in the United States and died in Boston at the age of 87.

== Main interests ==
Pritsak was a medievalist who specialized in the use of oriental, especially Turkic, sources for the history of Kievan Rus', early modern Ukraine, and the European Steppe region. He was also a student of Old Norse and was familiar with Scandinavian sources for the history of Kievan Rus'. His magnum opus, The Origin of Rus', only one volume of which has appeared in English (1981), inclines toward, but does not totally adopt, a Normanist interpretation of Rus' origins. He saw Kievan Rus' as a multi-ethnic polity.

In addition to the early Rus', Pritsak's works focused on Eurasian nomads and steppe empires such as those created by the Bulgars, Khazars, Pechenegs, and Kipchaks. However, he firmly rejected the "Eurasian" approach to Ukrainian and Russian history and would have nothing to do with its Russian nationalist postulates.

== Ukrainian historian ==
Unlike his predecessors Mykhailo Hrushevsky, Dmytro Doroshenko, and Ivan Krypiakevych, who wrote national histories or histories of the Ukrainian people, Pritsak followed the Ukrainian historian of Polish background, Vyacheslav Lypynsky, in proposing the ideal of writing a "territorialist" history of Ukraine that would include the Polish, Turkic, and other peoples who have inhabited the country from ancient times. This idea was later taken up by his younger contemporary Paul Robert Magocsi, who was for some time an associate of the Harvard Ukrainian Institute.

Pritsak sought to improve the quality and extent of Ukrainian studies at Harvard University. He supported establishing three different chairs for Ukrainian studies in the university: Ukrainian history, Ukrainian literature and Ukrainian philology.

== Omeljan Pritsak Research Center for Oriental Studies ==
Omeljan Pritsak Research Center for Oriental Studies named in honour of the Professor, was founded in 2009. It is based on an extensive library and archive collection of Omeljan Pritsak, which he made a pledge to transfer to Kyiv-Mohyla Academy after his death. The heritage, collected by Omeljan Pritsak for 70 years contains manuscripts, printed editions, publications, historical sources, archival documents and artistic and cultural monuments on philosophy, linguistics, world history, Oriental Studies, Slavic Studies, Scandinavian Studies, archeology, numismatics, philosophy etc. Thus it was brought to the National University of Kyiv-Mohyla Academy in 2007. The research center as well as the library and the archive collection, are now open to the public.

== Politics ==
Pritsak was a political conservative and during his youth in eastern Galicia under the Polish Republic, and later also during the Cold War was a supporter of the conservative "Hetmanite" or monarchist movement among Ukrainians. This led him to criticize Hrushevsky's political radicalism and historical populism, although, ironically, he claimed that Hrushevsky's "school" of history was being continued at Harvard. Also during the Cold War, Pritsak became prominent in the movement towards Ukrainian-Jewish reconciliation. Pritsak often was invited to brief Pope John Paul II on developments in Central and Eastern Europe.

== Published works ==
- The origins of the Old Rus' weights and monetary systems: Two studies in Western Eurasian metrology and numismatics in the seventh to eleventh centuries. Cambridge, Massachusetts: Distributed by Harvard University Press for the Harvard Ukrainian Research Institute, 1998.
- From Kievan Rus' to modern Ukraine: Formation of the Ukrainian nation (with Mykhailo Hrushevski and John Stephen Reshetar). Cambridge, Massachusetts: Ukrainian Studies Fund, Harvard University, 1984.
- Khazarian Hebrew documents of the tenth century. (with Golb, Norman Ithaca: Cornell University Press, 1982.
- "The Polovcians and Rus'" (Journal Article in Archivum Eurasiae medii aevi), 1982.
- The origin of Rus'. Cambridge, Massachusetts: Distributed by Harvard University Press for the Harvard Ukrainian Research Institute, 1981.
- Studies in medieval Eurasian history London: Variorum Reprints, 1981.
- On the writing of history in Kievan Rus. Cambridge, Massachusetts: Ukrainian Studies Fund, Harvard University, 1980.
- "The Khazar Kingdom's Conversion to Judaism." (Journal Article in Harvard Ukrainian studies, 1978)
- The Pechenegs: A Case of Social and Economic Transformation (Journal Article in Archivum Eurasiae medii aevi), 1975
- "Two Migratory Movements in the Eurasian Steppe in the 9th-11th Centuries". (Conference Paper in Proceedings : Proceedings of the 26th International Congress of Orientalists, New Delhi 1964, Vol. 2)
- The Decline of the Empire of the Oghuz Yabghu (Journal Article in Annals of the Ukrainian Academy of Arts and Sciences in the United States), 1952.
- Die Bulgarische Fürstenliste, Wiesbaden 1955.
