= 825 =

Calendar year

825 in various calendars
| Gregorian calendar | 825; DCCCXXV |
| Ab urbe condita | 1578 |
| Armenian calendar | 274; ԹՎ ՄՀԴ |
| Assyrian calendar | 5575 |
| Balinese saka calendar | 746–747 |
| Bengali calendar | 231–232 |
| Berber calendar | 1775 |
| Buddhist calendar | 1369 |
| Burmese calendar | 187 |
| Byzantine calendar | 6333–6334 |
| Chinese calendar | 甲辰年 (Wood Dragon); 3522 or 3315 — to — 乙巳年 (Wood Snake); 3523 or 3316 |
| Coptic calendar | 541–542 |
| Discordian calendar | 1991 |
| Ethiopian calendar | 817–818 |
| Hebrew calendar | 4585–4586 |
- Hindu calendars
| Vikram Samvat | 881–882 |
| Shaka Samvat | 746–747 |
| Kali Yuga | 3925–3926 |
| Holocene calendar | 10825 |
| Iranian calendar | 203–204 |
| Islamic calendar | 209–210 |
| Japanese calendar | Tenchō 2 (天長２年) |
| Javanese calendar | 721–722 |
| Julian calendar | 825; DCCCXXV |
| Korean calendar | 3158 |
| Minguo calendar | 1087 before ROC 民前1087年 |
| Nanakshahi calendar | −643 |
| Seleucid era | 1136/1137 AG |
| Thai solar calendar | 1367–1368 |
| Tibetan calendar | ཤིང་ཕོ་འབྲུག་ལོ་ (male Wood-Dragon); 951 or 570 or −202 — to — ཤིང་མོ་སྦྲུལ་ལོ་ (female Wood-Snake); 952 or 571 or −201 |

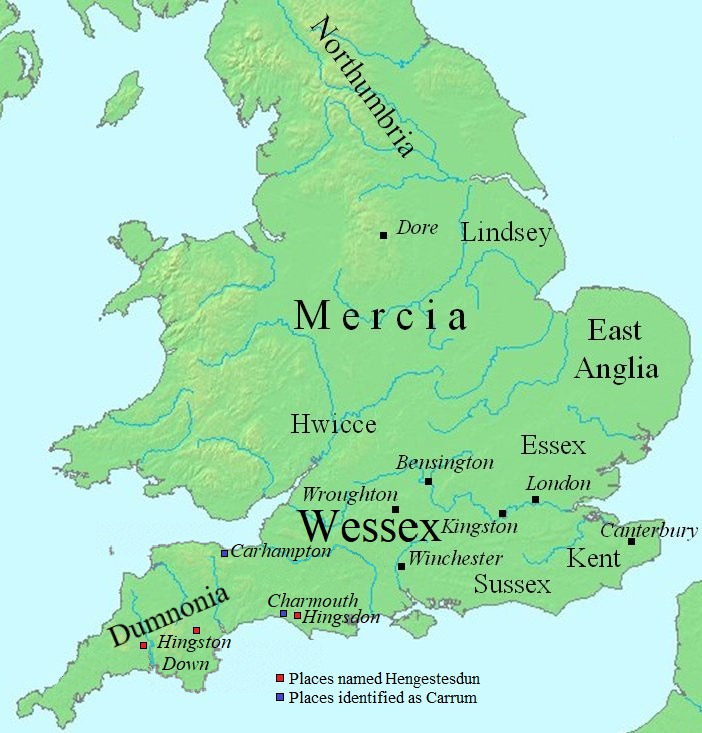
A map of England during Egbert's reign

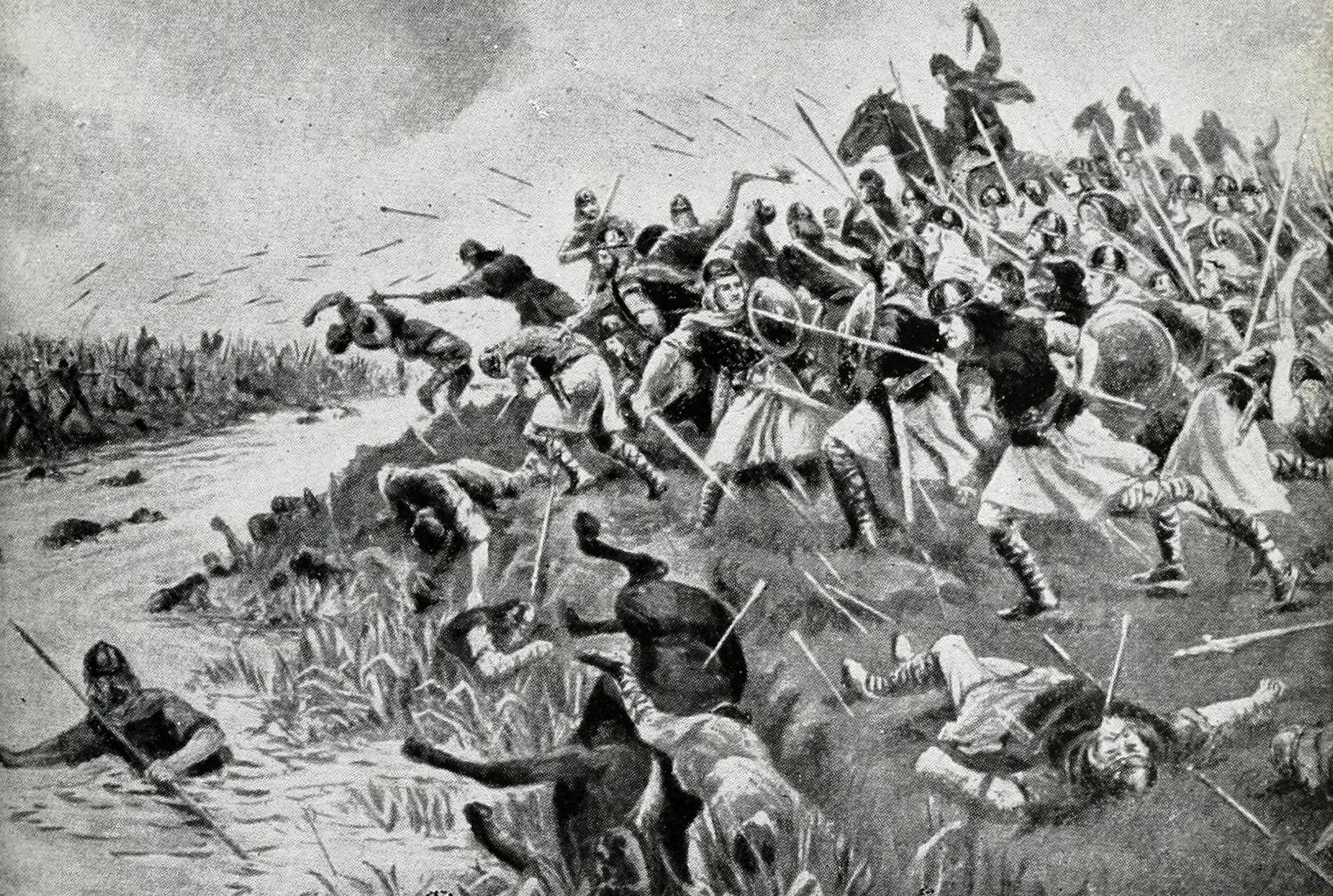
The Battle of Ellandun near Swindon (825)

Year 825 (DCCCXXV) was a common year starting on Sunday of the Julian calendar.

== Events ==
=== By place ===
==== India ====
- A group of Persio-Assyrian adherents of the Church of the East, under the leadership of two Persian bishops Prod (or Proth, also known as Aphroth) and Sappor (also known as Sabrisho), reach Kerala, India and reside in Quilon.
- August - This year, on the first day of Chingam month, Kerala’s Kollam Era ( Malayalam Era/Calendar, also known as Kollavarsham) commences.

==== Europe ====
- Emperor Louis the Pious begins a military campaign against the Wends and Sorbs. Duke Tunglo surrenders his son as hostage, and submits to Frankish rule (approximate date).
- Grímur Kamban becomes the first man to set foot in the Faroe Islands, and settles down in Funningur, on the northwest coast of Eysturoy (beginning the Norwegian Viking era on the islands).
- Murcia is founded by the emir of Cordoba Abd ar-Rahman II.

==== Britain ====
- Battle of Ellandun: King Egbert of Wessex defeats Beornwulf of Mercia near Swindon. The battle marks the end of the Mercian domination of southern England. The kingdoms of Kent, Surrey, Sussex and Essex submit to Wessex, and East Anglia acknowledges Egbert as overlord (bretwalda).
- King Hywel ap Rhodri of Gwynedd dies after an 11-year reign. The kingdom is seized by his grand-nephew, Merfyn Frych of Man.
- Battle of Gafulford: The men of Cornish Dumnonia clash with the West Saxons at modern-day Camelford (approximate date).

=== By topic ===
==== Religion ====
- Borobudur, a Mahayana Buddhist Temple, is completed in Central Java (modern Indonesia).

== Births ==
- Ariwara no Narihira, Japanese waka poet (d. 880)
- Charles, Frankish bishop and archchancellor (or 830)
- Fujiwara no Yasunori, Japanese nobleman (d. 895)
- Landulf II, bishop and count of Capua (approximate date)
- Louis II, king of Italy and Holy Roman Emperor (d. 875)
- Muhammad ibn Abdallah, Muslim governor (or 824)
- Ono no Komachi, Japanese poet (approximate date)
- Tsunesada, Japanese prince (d. 884)

== Deaths ==
- Abu Ubaidah, Muslim scholar (b. 728)
- Hywel ap Rhodri, king of Gwynedd (Wales)
- Ida of Herzfeld, Frankish noblewoman (approximate date)
- Liu Wu, general of the Tang Dynasty
- Máel Bressail mac Ailillo, king of Ulaid (Ireland)
- Song Ruozhao, Chinese scholar, lady-in-waiting and poet (b. 770)
- Rampon, count of Barcelona
- Welf, father of Judith of Bavaria
- Wihomarc, Breton chieftain
