= Æthelstan of East Anglia =

Ninth-century East Anglian king

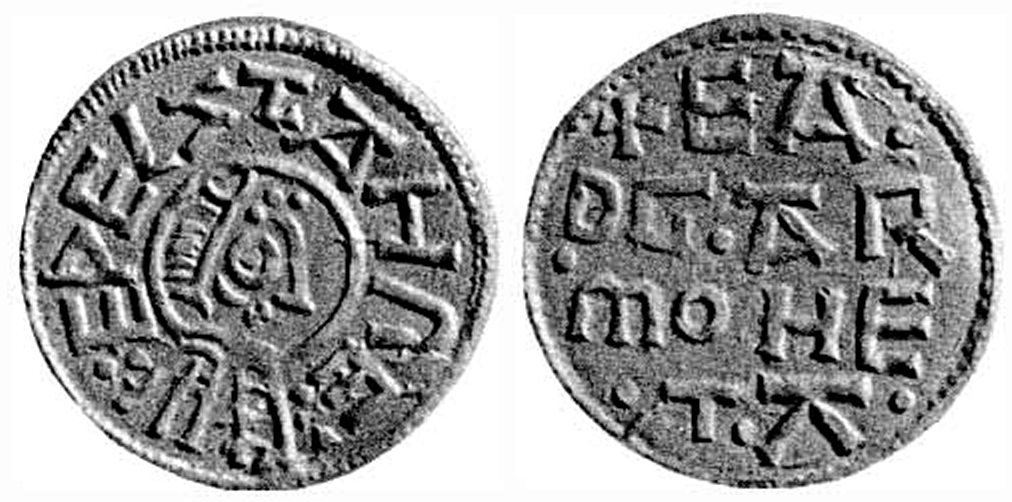
a coin from the reign of Æthelstan.

Æthelstan (/ˈæθəlstæn/) was king of East Anglia in the 9th century, the first East Anglian king after a century of Mercian domination. As with the other kings of East Anglia, there is very little textual information available. Æthelstan did, however, leave an extensive coinage of both portrait and non-portrait type. His reign cannot be precisely dated, but was likely from c. 827 to c. 840.

== Background ==
The Kingdom of East Anglia, formerly independent, had come under Mercian overlordship in the late 8th century. While the precise date is unknown, Offa of Mercia was minting coins in East Anglia by the 790s, and in 794 he had king Æethelberht II of East Anglia beheaded. Offa ushered in a period of Mercian domination that would last for over a century, but came to an end in the early 9th century.

The Anglo-Saxon Chronicle records that in 824, the East Anglians appealed to Mercia's rival Wessex for "peace and protection." The following year, Wessex defeated Mercia in Kent, and the East Anglians killed Beornwulf of Mercia. Two years later, Beornwulf's successor Ludeca of Mercia was himself killed, which some historians have speculated was during an attempt to reoccupy East Anglia; such attempts were certainly made, as Ludeca briefly minted coins there. Ludeca's death, whatever the cause, brought Mercian dominance in East Anglia to an end. Æthelstan likely played a role in the defeat of Beornwulf and/or Ludeca, though no accounts of this survive.

== Æthelstan's Reign ==
Æthelstan is not directly attested in any written sources, and his reign in East Anglia is evidenced only by his coins, which he begins to issue very shortly after Ludeca's death. On a number of these coins, Æthelstan is attested EDELSTAN on one face, and REX ANG on the reverse, allowing him to be confidently identified as an East Anglian king.

Among Æthelstan's coins are a number that bear the king's image alongside a ship, and have lettering similar to the coins of the early 820s; these coins may have been minted during an earlier attempt to assert East Anglian independence following the death of Ceolwulf.

The end of Æthelstan's reign is placed in the middle or late 840s. He was succeeded by Æthelweard.

| Preceded by Ludeca of Mercia | King of East Anglia after 827–840s | Succeeded by Æthelweard |
