= River Lew =

Two rivers in Devon, England

Coordinates: 50°50′N 4°04′W

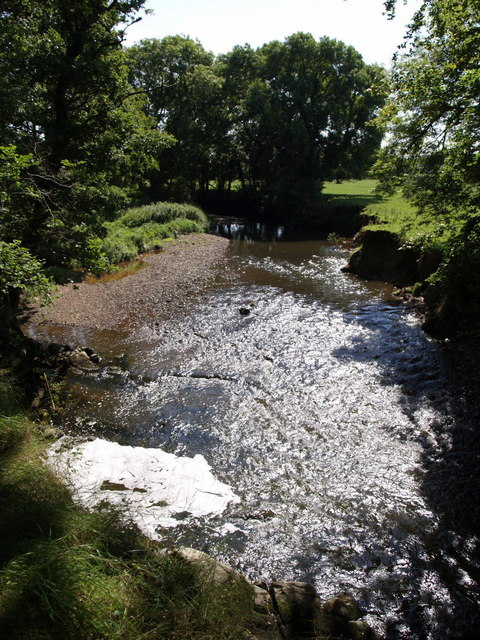
River Lew close to is confluence with the River Torridge

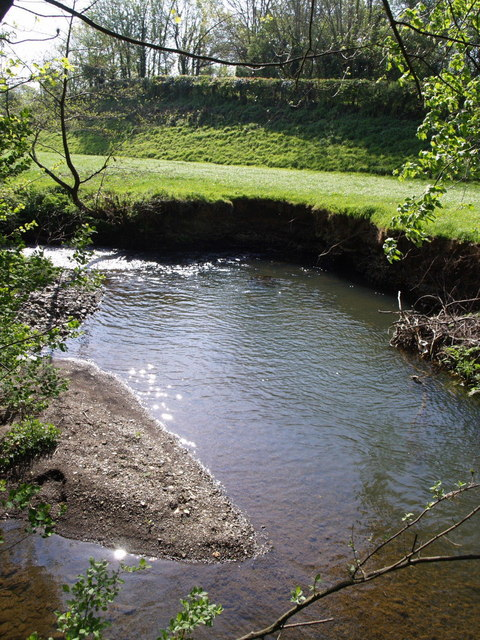
River Lew near to its confluence with the River Lyd

The River Lew can refer to either of two short rivers that lie close to each other in Devon, England.

The more northerly of the two rises just south of the village of Beaworthy, and flows east, then turns north to run past Hatherleigh before joining the River Torridge about 1 km north of the town. Its name is incorporated into that of the village of Northlew.

The more southerly of the two rises on the northwest corner of Dartmoor, near Sourton, and flows west and somewhat south, through the Lew Valley past Lewtrenchard and south of Lewdown before joining the River Lyd near Marystow. It has in earlier times also been known as Lew Water. The Anglo-Saxon Chronicle records a battle in 825 in which Devon forces loyal to Egbert of Wessex defeated the Cornish at Gafulford; and this is thought to be Galford on the banks of this river, though some translations render it as Camelford, some 20 miles further west.

At their nearest point the two rivers are not much more than 10 km apart. Domesday Book mentions a Lew Manor in this area, and it may be that both rivers take their name from it. Ekwall enters the southerly river as Lew Water and gives a derivation from British 'Lliw' for both (other river names are known to have the same origin). The manor cannot have been named any earlier than the Anglo-Saxon period
