= Æthelweard of East Anglia =

King of the East Angles from c.845 to 854

Æthelweard
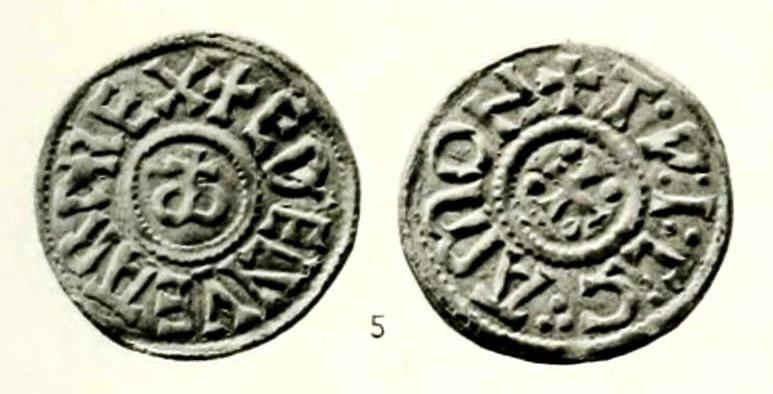
- The obverse and reverse of a coin from the reign of Æthelweard.

King of the East Angles
- Reign: c. 845 – 25 December 854
- Predecessor: Æthelstan
- Successor: Edmund
- Died: 854

Æthelweard (died 854) was a 9th-century king of East Anglia, the long-lived Anglo-Saxon kingdom which today includes the English counties of Norfolk and Suffolk. Little is known of Æthelweard's reign and even his regnal dates are not known for certain. He was succeeded by Edmund, who was said to have been crowned on 25 December 854.

== 9th century East Anglia ==
Prior to the arrival of the Vikings, the 6th century Kingdom of the East Angles was rich and powerful, with a distinctive ecclesiastical culture. Between this time and the early Norman period, practically nothing is known of the history of East Anglia, except that the kingdom was rich and powerful enough to remain independent. Its kings are in some cases known only from the coins issued during their reigns. According to the historian Barbara Yorke, Viking attacks eventually destroyed all the East Anglian monasteries, where books and charters would have been kept.

== Life and reign of Æthelweard ==
As with Æthelstan, whom he succeeded, textual evidence for Æthelweard's reign is very limited. He is not mentioned in the Anglo-Saxon Chronicle. However, numismatic evidence in the form of surviving coinage suggests that he was the ruler of an independent kingdom and not subject to Mercia or Wessex. The date when Æthelweard became king is uncertain, but it is conventionally dated to the middle or late 840s. It appears that he died in 854. He was succeeded as king by his fourteen-year-old son Edmund, later known as Saint Edmund, who was said to have been crowned on 25 December 854.

== Sources ==
- Campbell, James (1991). The Anglo-Saxons. London: Penguin Books. ISBN 978-0-14-014395-9.
- Kirby, D.P. (2000). The Earliest English Kings. London and New York: Routledge. ISBN 0-4152-4211-8.
- Yorke, Barbara (2002). Kings and Kingdoms of Early Anglo-Saxon England. London and New York: Routledge. ISBN 0-415-16639-X.

Preceded by Æthelstan	King of East Anglia; 840s–854	Succeeded by Edmund
