= Lewtrenchard =

Village and parish in Devon, England

Coordinates: 50.654°N 4.185°W

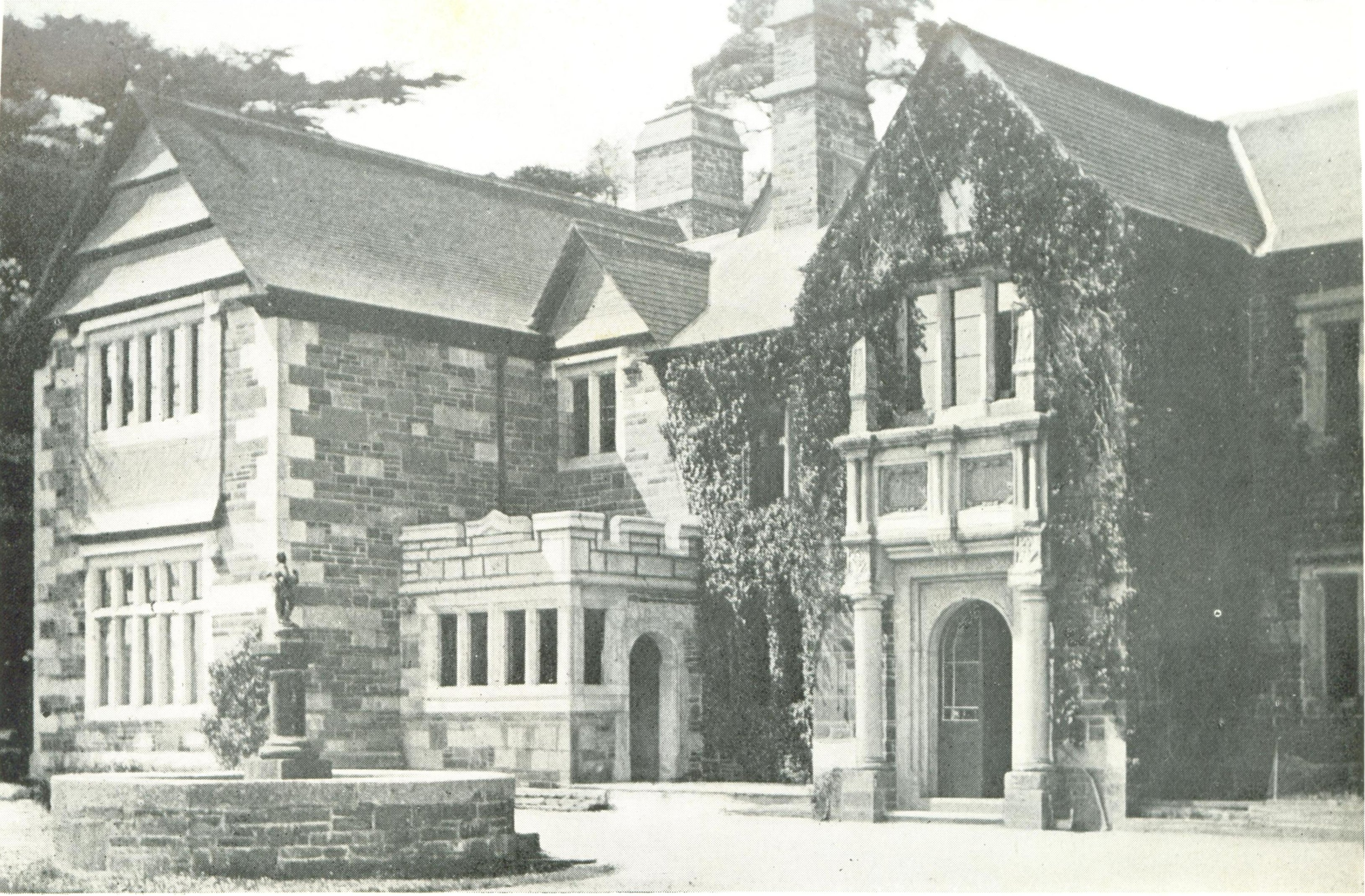

- Location within Devon
- Population: (2001 UK Census)
- Civil parish: Lewtrenchard
- District: West Devon
- Shire county: Devon
- Region: South West
- Country: England
- Sovereign state: United Kingdom
- Post town: Okehampton
- Postcode district: EX20
- Police: Devon and Cornwall
- Fire: Devon and Somerset
- Ambulance: South Western

Lewtrenchard is a village and civil parish in the West Devon district, in the county of Devon, England. Most of the larger village of Lewdown is in the parish. In the Domesday Book of 1086, a manor of Lew is recorded in this area and two rivers have the same name: see River Lew. Trenchard comes from the lords of the manor in the 13th century.

== Lew House ==
Lew House (or Lewtrenchard Manor) was built in the early 17th century (a datestone says 1620) but was altered considerably by the Victorian squire and parson Sabine Baring-Gould who resided there for many years. In 1872 he inherited the family estates of Lew Trenchard, which comprised 3,000 acres (12 km^{2}), and the gift of the living of Lew Trenchard parish. He was already in holy orders, so when the dwelling became vacant in 1881, on the death of his uncle Charles Baring-Gould, he was able to appoint himself to it, becoming parson as well as squire. He did a great deal of work restoring St. Peter's Church and his home Lew House, which has been preserved as he rebuilt it and is now a hotel.

== Parish Church ==
The Parish Church of St Peter (originally dedicated to St Petroc) is not of great architectural interest: the upper part of the tower is of granite ashlar and there is a fine series of benchends similar to those found in Cornish churches. These were returned to their original places when Sabine Baring-Gould replaced the deal box-pews that had been installed by his uncle. There are monuments of the 17th, 18th and 19th centuries to many Goulds and Baring-Goulds, including that of Beatrice Gracieuse Baring-Gould (d. 1876, aged 3), 1879, by Knittel of Fribourg (many of the earlier ones were moved here from Staverton by the parson as part of his programme of restoration). There is a painting of the Adoration of the Magi by the mediocre artist (Melchior-)Paul von Deschwanden (another copy is at Fribourg). The rood screen, carved by the Pinwill sisters, is impressive and was designed to resemble the one installed in 1523-24: it is adorned by 23 paintings, by Sabine Baring-Gould's daughter, Margaret (Daisy), 11 of the life of Jesus and 12 of Westcountry saints, and was completed in 1915.

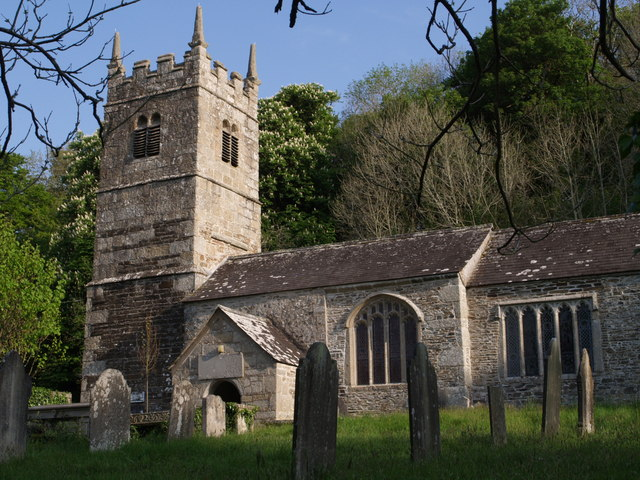
Parish Church of St. Peter

== Battle of Gafulford ==
Galford near Lewdown is assumed to be the site of the Battle of Gafulford in the 9th century. The Anglo-Saxon Chronicle states that in 825 (adjusted date) a battle was fought involving the "West Welsh" and the "Defnas". it states:- "The Westwealas (Cornish) and the Defnas (men of Devon) fought at Gafulforda". However, there is no mention of who won or who lost, whether the men of Cornwall and Devon were fighting each other or on the same side, and no mention of Egbert of Wessex. Local vicar Sabine Baring-Gould was the first to suggest that Gafulforda should be identified as Galford on the banks of the River Lew. He gave the name Galford a Celtic origin (Gafi a holdfast, and ffordd a road), though a more recent derivation is Gafol-ford meaning tax/tribute ford. Others, however, have suggested that Gafulford should be placed at Camelford, some 60 km further west.

== Notable residents ==
- Sabine Baring-Gould (1834–1924), Anglican priest, hymn writer, landowner, antiquarian.
- Lily Chitty (1893-1979), archaeologist, was born at Lewdown.
- Jethro (1948–2021), West Country comedian, resided in Lewdown.

Thomas Wood of Lew Trenchard built a mansion at Trevillet, Tintagel, Cornwall, in the 16th century. His son John became member of Parliament for the borough of Bossiney in the parliaments of 1614 and 1621–22, and died in 1623.
