= Baldred of Kent =

King of Kent

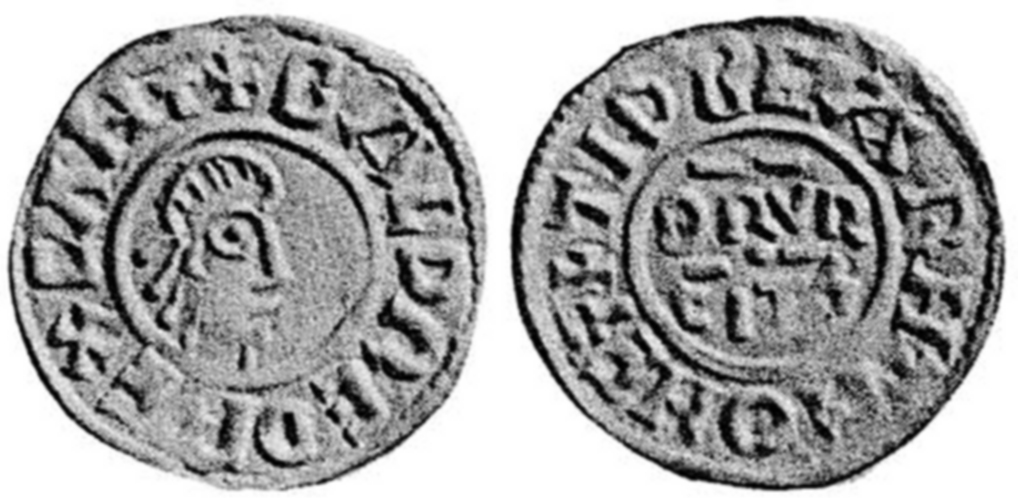
Coin of Baldred, minted at Canterbury.

Baldred was king of Kent, from 823 until 826 or 827. Ceolwulf I, king of Mercia, had ruled Kent directly, and was deposed by Beornwulf in 823, and at about the same time moneyers at Canterbury started issuing coins in the name of Baldred, king of Kent. It is uncertain whether he was independent or a Mercian under-king. In 826 or 827 he was expelled by Æthelwulf, son of King Egbert of Wessex, and Kent was ruled directly by Wessex thereafter.

Nineteen of his coins are known.

== Notes ==
Preceded by Ceolwulf I	King of Kent	Succeeded by Egbert
