= Gafulford =

Location mentioned in the Anglo-Saxon Chronicle

Gafulford (alternatively Gafulforda, Gafolforda or Gavelford) is the site of a battle in South West England known from the first entry in the Anglo-Saxon Chronicle for 823 AD (usually corrected to 825 AD): "Her wæs Weala gefeoht Defna æt Gafulford". A translation is: "there was a fight between the Weala and the Defna at Gafulford".

The whereabouts of Gafulford is not known today, though it is generally assumed to be in the west of Devon or the east of Cornwall. Of the several locations that have been proposed, Camelford in Cornwall and Galford near Lew Trenchard in West Devon have had the widest acceptance.

== Historical setting ==
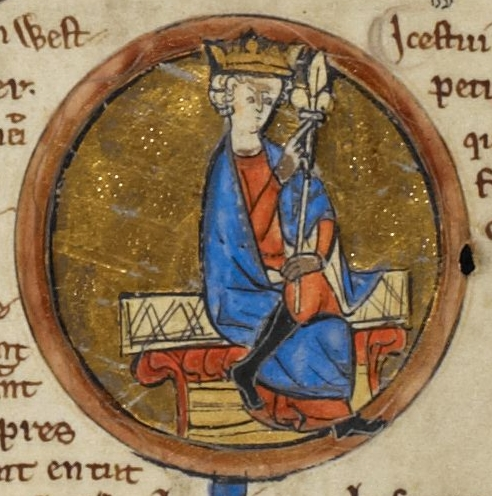
A 13th century depiction of Egbert of Wessex

The battle at Gafulford was one of a series of encounters between the Cornish (Wealas) and (possibly) the Saxons (here called Defnas, although technically this translates only as the people of Devon) that took place during the westward expansion of the Saxons under King Egbert, ruler of Wessex from 802 to 839 AD. It is known, on the basis of charters that he signed, that Egbert was at Crediton on 19 August 825, and he was in Southampton by 26 December 825. Not long afterwards he went on to defeat the Mercians at the Battle of Ellandun.

== Suggested locations ==
=== Camelford ===
Early historians and writers assumed that Gafulford was at the present day town of Camelford in East Cornwall. The poet John Milton was an early supporter of this theory, in his History of Britain of 1670.

In 1848 John Allen Giles wrote in his book The Life and Times of Alfred the Great that, "About the same time that this engagement Ellendunn was fought on the borders of Mercia, the Britons of Cornwall rebelled, and assailed the West-Saxons in the rear: but the men of Devonshire mustered in large numbers and met the enemy at Camelford: a furious conflict ensued, apparently with little advantage to either party, for, whilst most of the Chroniclers omit to state on which side the victory fell, Florence of Worcester alone tells us that the Britons were defeated, and Henry of Huntingdon says that many thousands were slain on both sides."

More recently Ralph Whitlock wrote in The Warrior Kings of Saxon England (1991): "The 'Wala' are held to be the Britons (Welsh), the 'Defna' the people of Devonshire, and 'Gafulford' has been tentatively identified as Camelford." Camelford was also one of the supposed locations of the final battle between King Arthur and Mordred.

=== Galford ===
Most recent historians prefer attribution to Galford on the River Lew near Lew Trenchard in West Devon. Sabine Baring-Gould was the first to make this suggestion. Robert Higham, in his book Making Anglo-Saxon Devon (2008), points out the derivation of the name is Gafol-ford meaning tax/tribute ford, and based on this derivation, he goes on to say that the location may have been a meeting place where either the West Saxons exacted tribute from the Cornish kings, or where tolls were levied on trade between the two territories. It had already been pointed out that such a location might well be a place where a dispute leading to fighting could arise. Higham also states that the battle may have been an influence on the early development of the nearby town of Lydford, which, as the westernmost burh in Wessex, suggests that the West Saxons did not consider Cornwall to be a defensible part of their kingdom.

=== Other locations ===
Several other locations have been proposed:

- In 1877, Kerslake wrote "The place meant by Gafulford is no doubt what is now called Fulford, in the parish of Dunsford, about eight miles west of Exeter, upon one of the southeastern spurs of Dartmoor." However, in 1922, J. J. Alexander rejected this interpretation on phonological grounds, pointing out that if Gafulford could change into Fulford, then Defenascir (the ancient name for Devonshire) would have mutated into Fenshire or Funshire.
- In a paper of 1897, J. May. Martin came to the conclusion that Gafulford was at a place known as Keymelford near Copplestone in Mid Devon. He used the existence of the ten-foot-tall granite pillar decorated with Celtic designs at the centre of the village as part of the evidence for his assertion. J. J. Alexander rejected Martin's interpretation on similar grounds to those he used to reject Kerslake's Fulford; in this case if Gafulford had developed into Keymelford (or, indeed, Camelford), he claimed, then Defenascir would have changed to Demonshire.
- The topographer Richard Nicholls Worth suggested in his History of Devonshire (1886) that the location was probably an ancient passage on the River Tamar.
- There have been claims that the location was at Slaughterbridge near Camelford. Although this association is based on the name and the proximity to Camelford, it is generally accepted that slaughter probably derives from the Old English word slohtre meaning marsh, so the name has no likely connection to any battle.

== Other interpretations ==
Commentators have pointed out that although it is known that King Egbert was pushing west into Devon and Cornwall at that time, the Anglo Saxon Chronicle does not state that he was present at this battle – Higham says the men of Devon (Defna) may have been led by their ealdorman. It has also been pointed out that there is no mention of who won the battle, though it has generally been assumed that it was the invading Defnas. However Fletcher has suggested that a Saxon victory seems unlikely, particularly given Egberts presence at Crediton (as witnessed in the charters) at a time when he is preparing for war with Mercia. Fletcher instead argues that the local fyrd may well have been defeated and Egbert's attention diverted west at an unwelcome moment. The incident has also been presented as a raid by the Cornish into Devon.

== Sources ==
- Alexander, J. J. (1922). "When the Saxons Came to Devon; Part IV". Report & Transactions of the Devonshire Association. LIV.
- Higham, Robert (2008). Making Anglo-Saxon Devon. Exeter: The Mint Press. ISBN 978-1-903356-57-9.
