= Beornwulf of Mercia =

King of Mercia from 823 to 826

Beornwulf
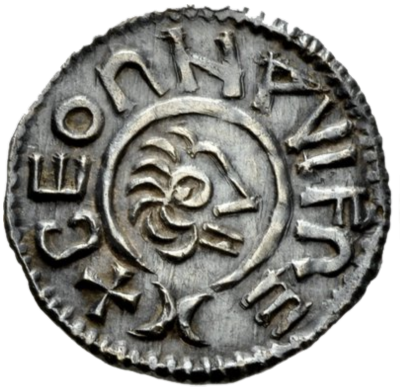
- Silver penny of Beornwulf from a mint in East Anglia, struck 823–825. Legend: +beornpvlf rex

King of Mercia
- Reign: 823–826
- Predecessor: Ceolwulf I
- Successor: Ludeca
- Died: 826

Beornwulf (died 826) was the King of Mercia, a kingdom of Anglo-Saxon England, from 823 until his death in 826. His short reign saw the collapse of Mercia's supremacy over the other kingdoms of the Anglo-Saxon Heptarchy. His name derives from the Old English terms beorn 'man, warrior' and wulf 'wolf'.

== Biography ==
Beornwulf became King of Mercia in 823 following the deposition of King Ceolwulf I. His family, as well as the majority of his background, are unknown. However, Beornwulf may be distantly related to a prior Mercian king, Beornred, as well as two subsequent rulers, Beorhtwulf and Burgred— all members of the so-called B-dynasty or group. Though this is only speculation, alliterative names were prevalent in Anglo-Saxon royal families, and the confirmed kin of these leaders also had names that began with B.

Prior to becoming king, Beornwulf is mentioned as having witnessed a charter of King Coenwulf in 812 and another of King Ceolwulf I in 823, but his position on each of these charters suggests that he was not of an exceptionally high rank.

In 825 Beornwulf marched against the West Saxons. Beornwulf's army met them at Ellandun (now Wroughton near Swindon in Wiltshire). Although the details are unknown, the battle ended in a disastrous defeat for the Mercians, and is seen by historians as the end of the so-called Mercian Supremacy. That same year, Ecgberht's son Æthelwulf invaded Kent and drove out its pro-Mercian king, Baldred.

In the wake of these events, Mercia's dominance in southern England rapidly unravelled. Essex and Sussex switched their loyalty to Ecgberht; and the East Anglians asked for Ecgberht's protection against the Mercians in the same year. Beornwulf was killed by the East Anglians in battle while attempting to put down a rebellion.

Beornwulf rebuilt the Abbey of St. Peter (later Gloucester Cathedral) and he presided over two synods at Clofesho (an unknown location believed to be near London) with Archbishop Wulfred of Canterbury, in 824 and 825. A Kentish charter shows that Beornwulf still had authority in Kent on 27 March 826 – S1267, issued on that date, is said to be in the third year of Beornwulf's reign. Coins minted during Beornwulf's reign are very rare, with only around 25 known examples.

== See also ==
- Kings of Mercia family tree

Beornwulf of Mercia B-dynasty of the Mercians Died: 826
Regnal titles
Preceded by Ceolwulf I	King of Mercia; 823–826	Succeeded by Ludeca
Preceded by Ceolwulf I	Ruler of East Anglia; 823–825	Succeeded by Æthelstan as King
Preceded by Ceolwulf I	Ruler of Kent; 823–825 with Baldred (c. 823–825)	Succeeded by Ecgberht with Æthelwulf
