= List of Anglo-Saxon Mercians =

- Ælfhere
- Ælfric
- Ælfweard
- Æthelwine
- Æthelwulf
- Alphege (originally Ælfheah)
- Beorhtric
- Eadric Streona
- Eadwig
- Ealdgyth
- Ealhhelm
- Ealhswith
- Goda
- Godwin
- Leofric
- Leofwine
- Morcar
- Northman
- Wulfric Spot

== Sources ==
- Marchini, Simon. "Biographies: Aelfgar - earl of Mercia". Archived from the original on 2007-09-29.
- Miller, Sean. "Anglo-Saxons.net Find: Stretton". Archived from the original on 30 September 2007.
