= Ecgberht, King of Wessex =

King of Wessex from 802 to 839

Ecgberht
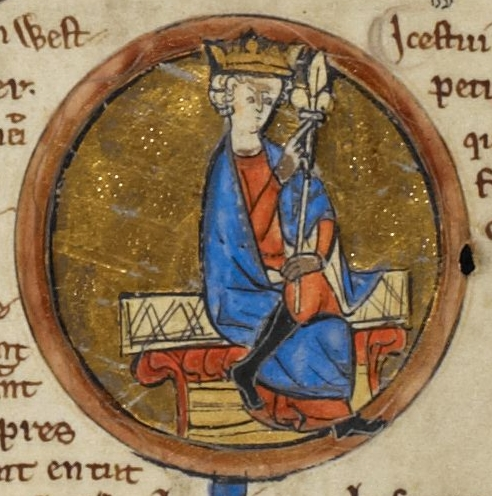
- Depiction of Ecgberht from the Genealogical Chronicle of the English Kings, a late 13th-century manuscript in the British Library

King of Wessex
- Reign: 802–839
- Predecessor: Beorhtric
- Successor: Æthelwulf

King of Essex and Kent
- Reign: 825–839
- Predecessor: Baldred
- Successor: Æthelwulf
- Died: 839
- Burial: Winchester
- Issue: Æthelwulf, King of Wessex
- House: Wessex
- Father: Ealhmund, King of Kent

Ecgberht (died 839), also spelled Egbert, Ecgbert, Ecgbriht, Ecgbeorht, and Ecbert, was King of Wessex from 802 until his death in 839. His father was King Ealhmund of Kent. In the 780s, Ecgberht was forced into exile to Charlemagne's court in the Frankish Empire by the kings Offa of Mercia and Beorhtric of Wessex, but on Beorhtric's death in 802, Ecgberht returned and took the throne.

Little is known of the first 20 years of Ecgberht's reign, but it is thought that he was able to maintain the independence of Wessex against the kingdom of Mercia, which at that time dominated the other southern English kingdoms. In 825, Ecgberht defeated Beornwulf of Mercia, ended Mercian Supremacy at the Battle of Ellandun, and proceeded to take control of the Mercian dependencies in southeastern England. In 829, he defeated Wiglaf of Mercia and drove him out of his kingdom, temporarily ruling Mercia directly. Later that year, Ecgberht received the submission of the Northumbrian king at Dore. The Anglo-Saxon Chronicle subsequently described Ecgberht as a bretwalda or 'wide-ruler' of Anglo-Saxon lands.

Ecgberht was unable to maintain this dominant position, and within a year Wiglaf regained the throne of Mercia. However, Wessex did retain control of Kent, Sussex, and Surrey; these territories were given to Ecgberht's son Æthelwulf to rule as a subking under Ecgberht. When Ecgberht died in 839, Æthelwulf succeeded him; the southeastern kingdoms were finally absorbed into the kingdom of Wessex after the death of Æthelwulf's son Æthelbald in 860. Ecgberht's descendants ruled Wessex and, later, all of England continuously until 1013.

== Family ==
Historians do not agree on Ecgberht's ancestry. The earliest version of the Anglo-Saxon Chronicle, the Parker Chronicle, begins with a genealogical preface tracing the ancestry of Ecgberht's son Æthelwulf back through Ecgberht, Ealhmund (thought to be king Ealhmund of Kent), and the otherwise unknown Eafa and Eoppa to Ingild, brother of King Ine of Wessex, who abdicated the throne in 726. It continues back to Cerdic, founder of the House of Wessex. Ecgberht's descent from Ingild was accepted by Frank Stenton, but not the earlier genealogy back to Cerdic. Heather Edwards in her Oxford Dictionary of National Biography article on Ecgberht argues that he was of Kentish origin and that the West Saxon descent may have been manufactured during his reign to give him legitimacy. However, Rory Naismith considered a purely Kentish heritage unlikely, acknowledging the possibility of ties to both Kentish and West Saxon ruling houses but concluding that as far as the most authoritative surviving sources are concerned, "Ecgberht was born of good West Saxon royal stock".

Ecgberht's wife's name is unknown. A fifteenth-century chronicle now held by Oxford University names her as Redburga, supposedly a relative of Charlemagne whom he married when he was banished to Francia, but this is dismissed by academic historians in view of its late date.

He is reputed to have had a half-sister Alburga, later to be recognised as a saint for her founding of Wilton Abbey. She was married to Wulfstan, ealdorman of Wiltshire, and on his death in 802 she became a nun, Abbess of Wilton Abbey.

== Political context and early life ==
Ecgberht's name, spelled Ecgbriht, from the 827 entry in the C manuscript of the Anglo-Saxon Chronicle

Offa of Mercia, who reigned from 757 to 796, was the dominant force in Anglo-Saxon England in the second half of the eighth century. The relationship between Offa and Cynewulf, who was king of Wessex from 757 to 786, is not well documented, but it seems likely that Cynewulf maintained some independence from Mercian overlordship. Evidence of the relationship between kings can come from charters, which were documents which granted land to followers or to churchmen, and which were witnessed by the kings who had the power to grant the land.

=== Subregulus ===
In some cases, a king will appear on a charter as a subregulus (subking or underking), making it clear that he has an overlord. Cynewulf appears as "King of the West Saxons" on a charter of Offa's in 772, and in 779, he was defeated at the Battle of Bensington by Offa, but there is nothing else to suggest Cynewulf was not his own master, and he is not known to have acknowledged Offa as overlord. Offa did have influence in the southeast of the country: a charter of 764 shows him in the company of Heahberht of Kent, suggesting that Offa's influence helped place Heahberht on the throne. The extent of Offa's control of Kent between 765 and 776 is a matter of debate amongst historians, but from 776 until about 784 it appears that the Kentish kings had substantial independence from Mercia.

Another Ecgberht, Ecgberht II of Kent, ruled in that kingdom throughout the 770s; he is last mentioned in 779, in a charter granting land at Rochester. In 784 a new king of Kent, Ealhmund, appears in the Anglo-Saxon Chronicle. According to a note in the margin, "this king Ealhmund was Egbert's father [i.e. Ecgberht of Wessex], Egbert was Æthelwulf's father". This is supported by the genealogical preface from the A text of the Chronicle, which gives Ecgberht's father's name as Ealhmund without further details. The preface probably dates from the late ninth century; the marginal note is on the F manuscript of the Chronicle, which is a Kentish version dating from about 1100.

Ealhmund does not appear to have long survived in power: there is no record of his activities after 784. There is, however, the extensive evidence of Offa's domination of Kent during the late 780s, with his goals apparently going beyond overlordship to outright annexation of the kingdom, and he has been described as "the rival, not the overlord, of the Kentish kings". It is possible that the young Ecgberht fled to Wessex in 785 or so; it is suggestive that the Chronicle mentions in a later entry that Beorhtric, Cynewulf's successor, helped Offa to exile Ecgberht.

Cynewulf was murdered in 786. His succession was contested by Ecgberht, but he was defeated by Beorhtric, maybe with Offa's assistance. The Anglo-Saxon Chronicle records that Ecgberht spent three years in Francia before he was king, exiled by Beorhtric and Offa. The text says "iii" for three, but this may have been a scribal error, with the correct reading being "xiii", which is thirteen years. Beorhtric's reign lasted sixteen years, and not thirteen; and all extant texts of the Chronicle agree on "iii", but many modern accounts assume that Ecgberht did indeed spend thirteen years in Francia. This requires assuming that the error in transcription is common to every manuscript of the Anglo-Saxon Chronicle; many historians make this assumption but others have rejected it as unlikely, given the consistency of the sources. In either case Ecgberht was probably exiled in 789, when Beorhtric, his rival, married the daughter of Offa of Mercia.

At the time Ecgberht was in exile, Francia was ruled by Charlemagne, who maintained Frankish influence in Northumbria and is known to have supported Offa's enemies in the south. Another exile in Gaul at this time was Odberht, a priest, who is almost certainly the same person as Eadberht, who later became king of Kent. According to a later chronicler, William of Malmesbury, Ecgberht learned the arts of government during his time in Gaul.

== Early reign ==
Beorhtric's dependency on Mercia continued into the reign of Cenwulf, who became king of Mercia a few months after Offa's death. Beorhtric died in 802, and Ecgberht came to the throne of Wessex, probably with the support of Charlemagne and perhaps also the papacy. The Mercians continued to oppose Ecgberht: the day of his accession, the Hwicce (who had originally formed a separate kingdom, but by that time were part of Mercia) attacked, under the leadership of their ealdorman, Æthelmund. Weohstan, a Wessex ealdorman, met him with men from Wiltshire; according to a 15th-century source, Weohstan had married Alburga, Ecgberht's sister, and so was his brother-in-law. The Hwicce were defeated, though Weohstan was killed as well as Æthelmund. Nothing more is recorded of Ecgberht's relations with Mercia for more than twenty years after this battle. It seems likely that Ecgberht had no influence outside his own borders, but on the other hand, there is no evidence that he ever submitted to the overlordship of Cenwulf. Cenwulf did have overlordship of the rest of southern England, but in Cenwulf's charters the title of "overlord of the southern English" never appears, presumably in consequence of the independence of the kingdom of Wessex.

In 815, The Anglo-Saxon Chronicle records that Ecgberht ravaged the whole of the territories of the remaining British kingdom, Dumnonia, known to the author of The Anglo-Saxon Chronicle as the West Welsh; their territory was about equivalent to what is now Cornwall. Ten years later, a charter dated 19 August 825 indicates that Ecgberht was campaigning in Dumnonia again; this may have been related to a battle recorded in the Chronicle at Gafulford in 823, between the men of Devon and the Britons of Cornwall.

== Battle of Ellandun ==
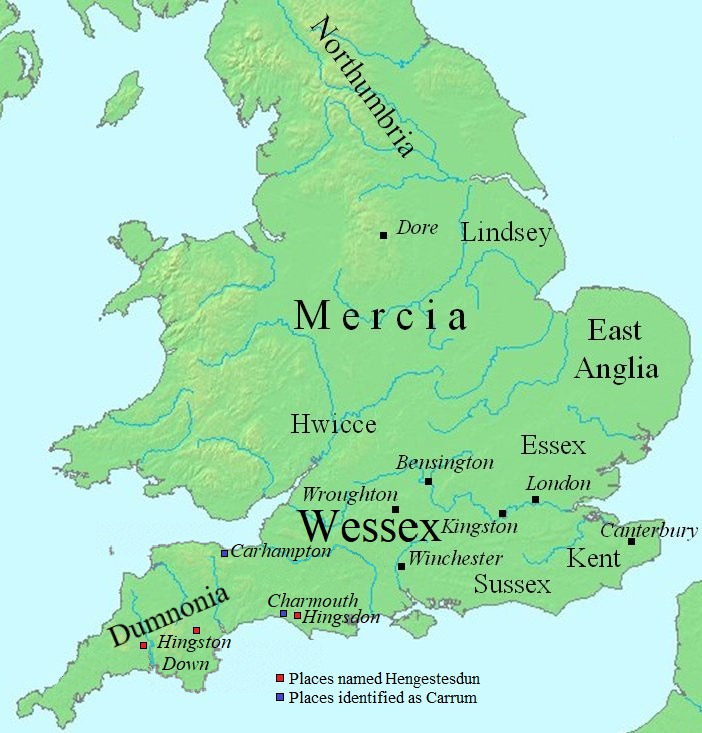
A map of England during Ecgberht's reign

It was also in 825 that one of the most important battles in Anglo-Saxon history took place, when Ecgberht defeated Beornwulf of Mercia at Ellandun—now Wroughton, near Swindon. This battle marked the end of the Mercian domination of southern England. The Chronicle tells how Ecgberht followed up his victory: "Then he sent his son Æthelwulf from the army, and Ealhstan, his bishop, and Wulfheard, his ealdorman, to Kent with a great troop." Æthelwulf drove Baldred, the king of Kent, north over the Thames, and according to the Chronicle, the men of Kent, Essex, Surrey and Sussex then all submitted to Æthelwulf "because earlier they were wrongly forced away from his relatives". This may refer to Offa's interventions in Kent at the time Ecgberht's father Ealhmund became king; if so, the chronicler's remark may also indicate Ealhmund had connections elsewhere in southeast England.

The Chronicle's version of events makes it appear that Baldred was driven out shortly after the battle, but this was probably not the case. A document from Kent survives which gives the date, March 826, as being in the third year of the reign of Beornwulf. This makes it likely that Beornwulf still had authority in Kent at this date, as Baldred's overlord; hence Baldred was apparently still in power. In Essex, Ecgberht expelled King Sigered, though the date is unknown. It may have been delayed until 829 since a later chronicler associates the expulsion with a campaign of Ecgberht's in that year against the Mercians.

The Anglo-Saxon Chronicle does not say who was the aggressor at Ellandun, but one recent history asserts that Beornwulf was almost certainly the one who attacked. According to this view, Beornwulf may have taken advantage of the Wessex campaign in Dumnonia in the summer of 825. Beornwulf's motivation to launch an attack would have been the threat of unrest or instability in the southeast: the dynastic connections with Kent made Wessex a threat to Mercian dominance.

The consequences of Ellandun went beyond the immediate loss of Mercian power in the southeast. According to the Chronicle, the East Anglians asked for Ecgberht's protection against the Mercians in the same year, 825, though it may actually have been in the following year that the request was made. In 826, Beornwulf invaded East Anglia, presumably to recover his overlordship. He was slain, however, as was his successor, Ludeca, who invaded East Anglia in 827, evidently for the same reason. It may be that the Mercians were hoping for support from Kent: there was some reason to suppose that Wulfred, the Archbishop of Canterbury, might be discontented with West Saxon rule, as Ecgberht had terminated Wulfred's currency and had begun to mint his own, at Rochester and Canterbury, and it is known that Ecgberht seized property belonging to Canterbury. The outcome in East Anglia was a disaster for the Mercians, which confirmed West Saxon power in the southeast.

== Defeat of Mercia ==
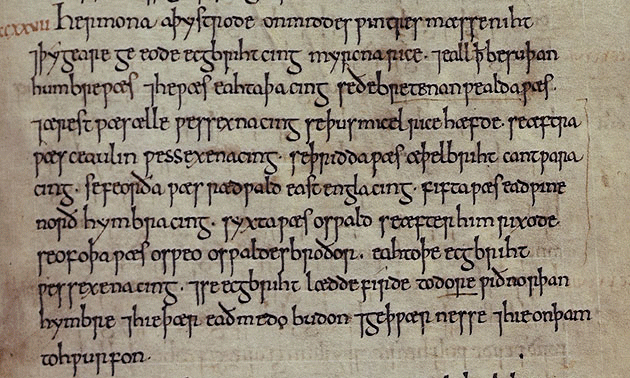
The entry for 827 in the C manuscript of the Anglo-Saxon Chronicle, listing the eight bretwaldas

In 829, Ecgberht invaded Mercia and drove Wiglaf, the king of Mercia, into exile. This victory gave Ecgberht control of the London Mint, and he issued coins as King of Mercia. It was after this victory that the West Saxon scribe described him as a bretwalda, meaning 'wide-ruler' or perhaps 'Britain-ruler', in a famous passage in The Anglo-Saxon Chronicle. The relevant part of the annal reads, in the C manuscript of the Chronicle:

⁊ þy geare geeode Ecgbriht cing Myrcna rice ⁊ eall þæt be suþan Humbre wæs, ⁊ he wæs eahtaþa cing se ðe Bretenanwealda wæs.

In modern English:

And the same year King Egbert conquered the kingdom of Mercia, and all that was south of the Humber, and he was the eighth king who was 'Wide-ruler'.

The previous seven bretwaldas are also named by the Chronicler, who gives the same seven names that Bede lists as holding imperium, starting with Ælle of Sussex and ending with Oswiu of Northumbria. The list is often thought to be incomplete, omitting as it does some dominant Mercian kings such as Penda and Offa. The exact meaning of the title has been much debated; it has been described as "a term of encomiastic poetry" but there is also evidence that it implied a definite role of military leadership.

Later in 829, according to the Anglo-Saxon Chronicle, Ecgberht received the submission of the Northumbrians at Dore (now a suburb of Sheffield); the Northumbrian king was probably Eanred. According to a later chronicler, Roger of Wendover, Ecgberht invaded Northumbria and plundered it before Eanred submitted: "When Ecgberht had obtained all the southern kingdoms, he led a large army into Northumbria, and laid waste that province with severe pillaging, and made King Eanred pay tribute." Roger of Wendover is known to have incorporated Northumbrian annals into his version; the Chronicle does not mention these events. However, the nature of Eanred's submission has been questioned: one historian has suggested that it is more likely that the meeting at Dore represented a mutual recognition of sovereignty.

In 830, Ecgberht led a successful expedition against the Welsh, almost certainly with the intent of extending West Saxon influence into the Welsh lands previously within the Mercian orbit. This marked the high point of Ecgberht's influence.

== Reduction in influence after 829 ==
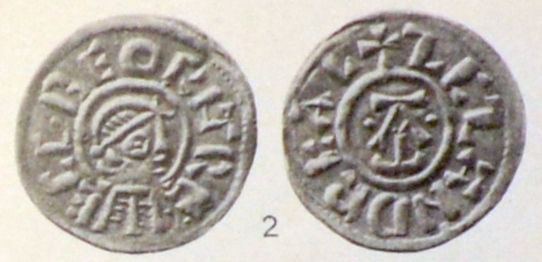
Coin of King Ecgberht

In 830, Mercia regained its independence under Wiglaf—the Chronicle merely says that Wiglaf "obtained the kingdom of Mercia again", but the most likely explanation is that this was the result of a Mercian rebellion against the Wessex rule.

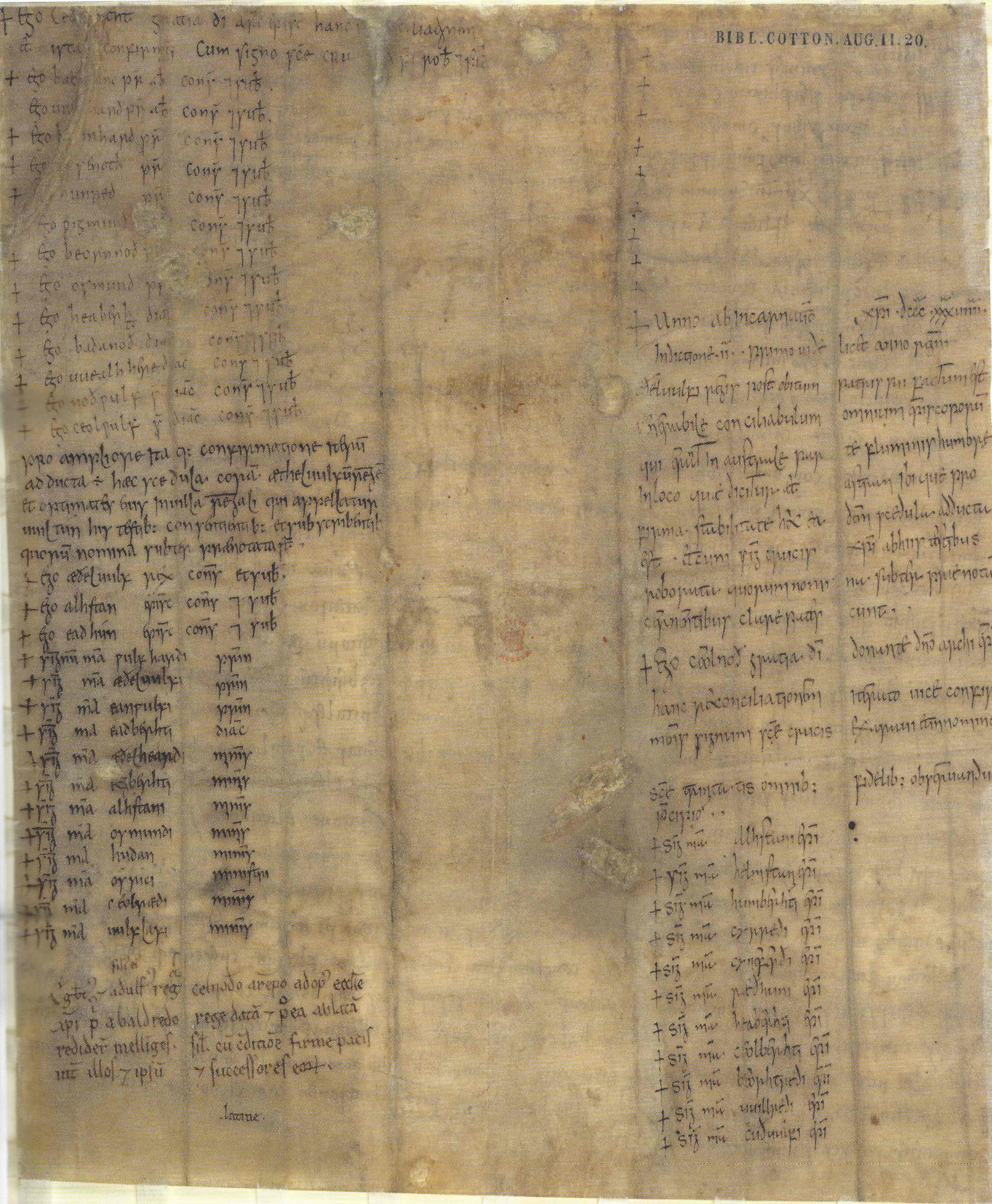
Charter S 1438, in which King Ecgberht and the Archbishop of Canterbury promised mutual support of the church and the West Saxon crown at the Council of Kingston in 838.

Ecgberht's dominion over southern England came to an end with Wiglaf's recovery of power. Wiglaf's return is followed by evidence of his independence from Wessex. Charters indicate Wiglaf had authority in Middlesex and Berkshire, and in a charter of 836, Wiglaf uses the phrase "my bishops, duces, and magistrates" to describe a group that included eleven bishops from the episcopate of Canterbury, including bishops of sees in West Saxon territory. It is significant that Wiglaf was still able to call together such a group of notables; the West Saxons, even if they were able to do so, held no such councils. Wiglaf may also have brought Essex back into the Mercian orbit during the years after he recovered the throne. In East Anglia, King Æthelstan minted coins, possibly as early as 827, but more likely c. 830 after Ecgberht's influence was reduced with Wiglaf's return to power in Mercia. This demonstration of independence on East Anglia's part is not surprising, as it was Æthelstan who was probably responsible for the defeat and death of both Beornwulf and Ludeca.

Both Wessex's sudden rise to power in the late 820s, and the subsequent failure to retain this dominant position, have been examined by historians looking for underlying causes. One plausible explanation for the events of these years is that Wessex's fortunes were to some degree dependent on Carolingian support. The Franks supported Eardwulf when he recovered the throne of Northumbria in 808, so it is plausible that they also supported Ecgberht's accession in 802. During Easter 839, not long before Ecgberht's death, he was in touch with Louis the Pious, king of the Franks, to arrange safe passage to Rome. Hence, a continuing relationship with the Franks seems to be part of southern English politics during the first half of the ninth century.

Carolingian support may have been one of the factors that helped Ecgberht achieve the military successes of the late 820s. However, the Rhenish and Frankish commercial networks collapsed at some time in the 820s or 830s, and in addition, a rebellion broke out in February 830 against Louis the Pious—the first of a series of internal conflicts that lasted through the 830s and beyond. These distractions may have prevented Louis from supporting Ecgberht. In this view, the withdrawal of Frankish influence would have left East Anglia, Mercia, and Wessex to find a balance of power not dependent on outside aid.

Despite the loss of dominance, Ecgberht's military successes fundamentally changed the political landscape of Anglo-Saxon England. Wessex retained control of the south-eastern kingdoms, with the possible exception of Essex, and Mercia did not regain control of East Anglia. Ecgberht's victories marked the end of the independent existence of the kingdoms of Kent and Sussex. The conquered territories were administered as a subkingdom for a while, including Surrey and possibly Essex. Although Æthelwulf was a subking under Ecgberht, it is clear that he maintained his own royal household, with which he travelled around his kingdom. Charters issued in Kent described Ecgberht and Æthelwulf as "kings of the West Saxons and also of the people of Kent". When Æthelwulf died in 858 his will, in which Wessex is left to one son and the southeastern kingdom to another, makes it clear that it was not until after 858 that the kingdoms were fully integrated. Mercia remained a threat, however; Ecgberht's son Æthelwulf, established as king of Kent, gave estates to Christ Church, Canterbury, probably to counter any influence the Mercians might still have there.

In the southwest, Ecgberht was defeated in 836 at Carhampton by the Danes, but in 838, he won a battle against them and their allies, the West Welsh, at the Battle of Hingston Down in Cornwall. The Dumnonian royal line continued after this time, but it is at this date that the independence of one of the last British kingdoms may be considered to have ended. The details of Anglo-Saxon expansion into Cornwall are quite poorly recorded, but some evidence comes from place names. The River Ottery, which flows east into the Tamar near Launceston, appears to be a boundary: south of the Ottery the placenames are overwhelmingly Cornish, whereas to the north they are more heavily influenced by the English newcomers.

== Succession ==
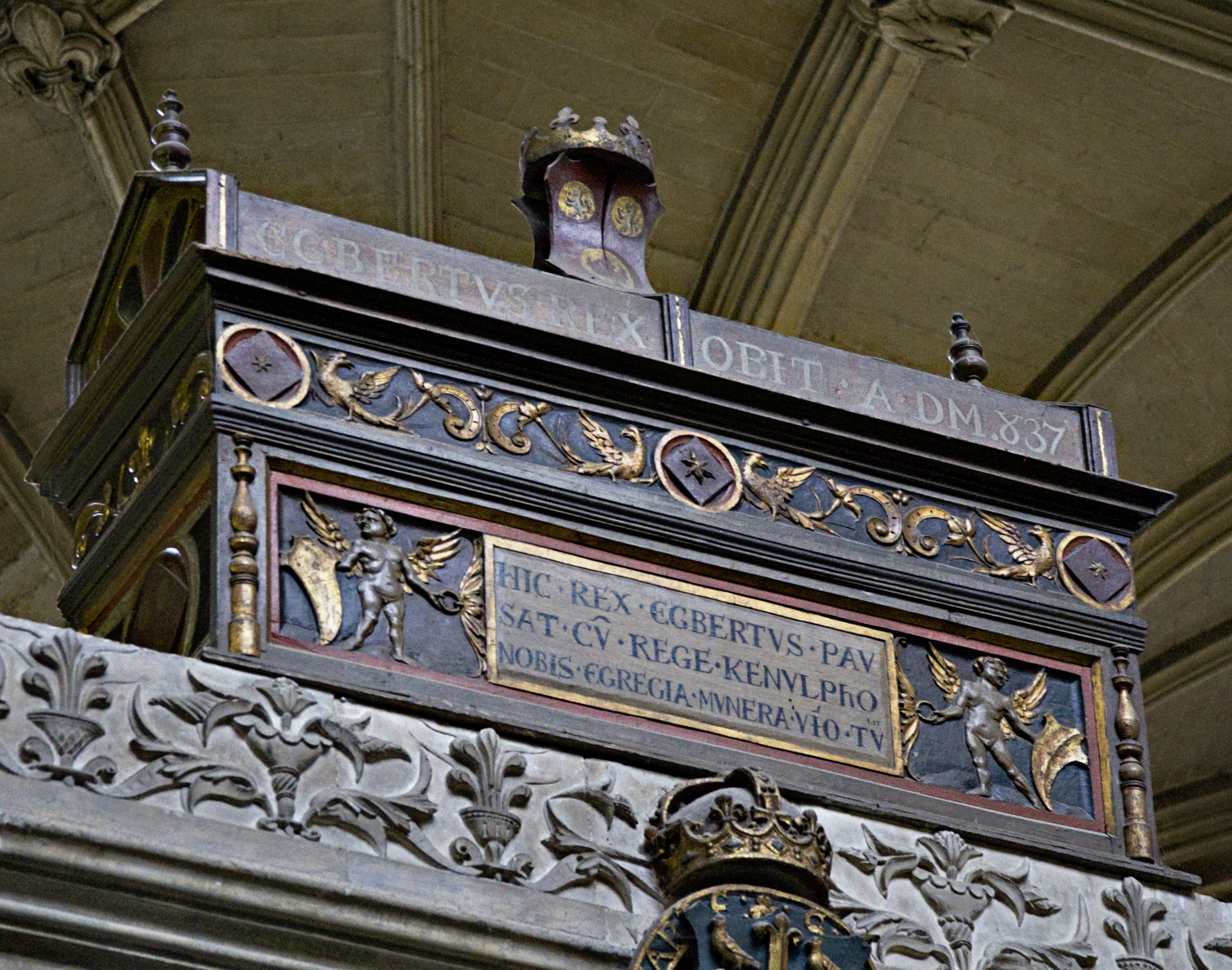
16th-century mortuary chest, one in a series set up by Bishop Foxe in Winchester Cathedral, which purports to contain Ecgberht's bones

At a council at Kingston upon Thames in 838, Ecgberht and Æthelwulf granted land to the sees of Winchester and Canterbury in return for the promise of support for Æthelwulf's claim to the throne. The archbishop of Canterbury, Ceolnoth, also accepted Ecgberht and Æthelwulf as the lords and protectors of the monasteries under Ceolnoth's control. These agreements, along with a later charter in which Æthelwulf confirmed church privileges, suggest that the church had recognised that Wessex was a new political power that must be dealt with. Churchmen consecrated the king at coronation ceremonies, and helped to write the wills which specified the king's heir; their support had real value in establishing West Saxon control and a smooth succession for Ecgberht's line. Both the record of the Council of Kingston, and another charter of that year, include the identical phrasing: that a condition of the grant is that "we ourselves and our heirs shall always hereafter have firm and unshakable friendships from Archbishop Ceolnoth and his congregation at Christ Church."

Although nothing is known of any other claimants to the throne, it is likely that there were other surviving descendants of Cerdic (the supposed progenitor of all the kings of Wessex) who might have contended for the kingdom. Ecgberht died in 839, and his will, according to the account of it found in the will of his grandson, Alfred the Great, left land only to male members of his family, so that the estates should not be lost to the royal house through marriage. Ecgberht's wealth, acquired through conquest, was no doubt one reason for his ability to purchase the support of the southeastern church establishment; the thriftiness of his will indicates he understood the importance of personal wealth to a king. The kingship of Wessex had been frequently contested among different branches of the royal line, and it is a noteworthy achievement of Ecgberht's that he was able to ensure Æthelwulf's untroubled succession. In addition, Æthelwulf's experience of kingship, in the subkingdom formed from Ecgberht's southeastern conquests, would have been valuable to him when he took the throne.

Ecgberht was buried in Winchester, as were his son, Æthelwulf, his grandson, Alfred the Great, and his great-grandson, Edward the Elder. During the ninth century, Winchester began to show signs of urbanisation, and it is likely that the sequence of burials indicates that Winchester was held in high regard by the West Saxon royal line.

== Notes ==
Regnal titles
| Preceded by Beorhtric | King of Wessex; 802–839 | Succeeded by Æthelwulf |
| Preceded by Baldred | King of Kent; 825–839 | Succeeded by Æthelwulf |
