= Mercian Supremacy =

Period of history when the kingdom of Mercia dominated in England

Maps illustrating the increasing hegemony of Mercia in the 8th century

The First Mercian Supremacy was the period of Anglo-Saxon history between c. 716 and c. 825, when the kingdom of Mercia dominated the Anglo-Saxon Heptarchy in what later became England. Historian Sir Frank Stenton apparently coined the phrase, arguing that Offa of Mercia, who ruled 757–796, effectively achieved the unification of the Anglo Saxon lands, south of Yorkshire. Scholastic opinion on the relationship between the kingdoms of Wessex and Mercia at this time remains divided.

== History ==
While the precise period during which the Mercian Supremacy existed remains uncertain – depending upon whether one includes the reigns of Penda (c. 626–655) and Wulfhere (658–675) – the end of the era is generally agreed to be around 825, following the defeat of King Beornwulf at the Battle of Ellandun, near present-day Swindon.

Nicholas Brooks noted that "the Mercians stand out as by far the most successful of the various early Anglo-Saxon peoples until the later ninth century" between 633 and 825. An exception in this period was three years of Northumbrian domination.

Recorded by Bede as the nemesis of early Anglo-Saxon Northumbria, Penda of Mercia achieved an early expansion of his kingdom's territory. His reign ended with his death in battle, which was followed by a brief three-year period when Northumbria ruled over the Mercians. The rebellion against Northumbria by Penda's son Wulfhere in 658 immediately preceded the restoration of Penda's kingdom and a period of expansion in which Mercia's influence reached as far south as the Isle of Wight.

During this period of expansion, Mercia lost its province of the Kingdom of Lindsey to Northumbria in 661. Its recapture by Æthelred of Mercia following the Battle of the Trent in 679 secured Mercia's position as the dominant Anglo-Saxon power for over a century.

Mercia's hold over the Anglo-Saxon kingdoms of Essex, Sussex and Kent seems to have been tenuous until 716, when Æthelbald of Mercia restored Mercia's hegemony for over forty years. Offa's accession in 757 heralded the beginning of a golden age for Mercia. Some historians have suggested that Offa's defeat of the Welsh and the West Saxons of Wessex established the Mercian Supremacy. This remained unchallenged until 825, when Egbert of Wessex supported an East Anglian rebellion against Beornwulf of Mercia, whose defeat at Ellendun effectively brought the Supremacy to an end.
