= Ludeca of Mercia =

King of Mercia from 826 to 827

Ludeca
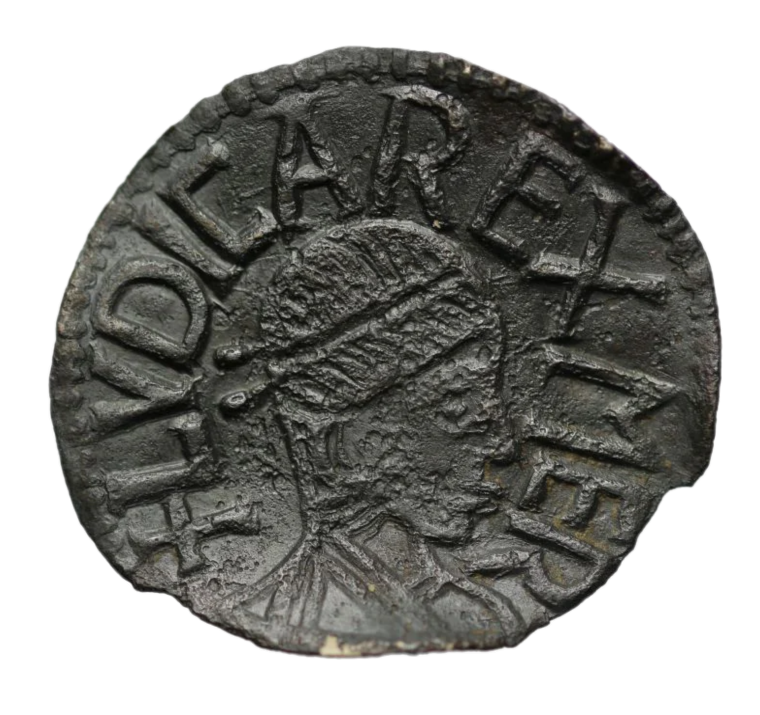
- Silver penny of Ludeca from the London mint. Legend: lvdica rex mer

King of Mercia
- Reign: 826–827
- Predecessor: Beornwulf
- Successor: Wiglaf
- Died: 827

Ludeca or Ludica (died 827) was the King of Mercia from 826 to 827. He became king after the death of Beornwulf in battle against the rebellious East Angles, but he too was killed in another failed attempt to subjugate them in the following year.

The Anglo-Saxon Chronicle simply states that Ludeca "was slain, and his five Ealdormen with him", but Florence of Worcester (who, incidentally, carries the same two-year error as the earlier 'Chronicles' - both place this event in 825 instead of 827) fleshes out the story: "Ludecan, king of the Mercians, mustered his forces and led an army into the province of the East Angles, for the purpose of taking vengeance for the death of king Beornulf, his predecessor. He was quickly met by the natives and their king, who in a severe battle slew him and five of his Ealdormen, and very many of his troops, and put to flight the remainder. Wiglaf succeeded to his splendid kingdom."

Prior to Ludeca's rule, he was mentioned in two charters from 824 as a dux under Beornwulf. The Fitzwilliam Museum also holds a silver penny minted during Ludeca's reign, thought to have been minted at Ipswich by a moneyer named Wærbeald.

In 2016, a coin establishing Ludeca's rule over London in 826 was found. Prior to the discovery, it had been thought that Wessex took London from the Mercians at the Battle of Ellandun in 825.

== See also ==
- List of monarchs of Mercia

Preceded by Beornwulf	King of Mercia; 826–827	Succeeded by Wiglaf
