= Mercia =

Early English kingdom (527–918)

Coordinates: 52.6°N 1.6°W

Kingdom of Mercia Old English: Mercna rīċe Latin: Merciorum regnum
- 527–918
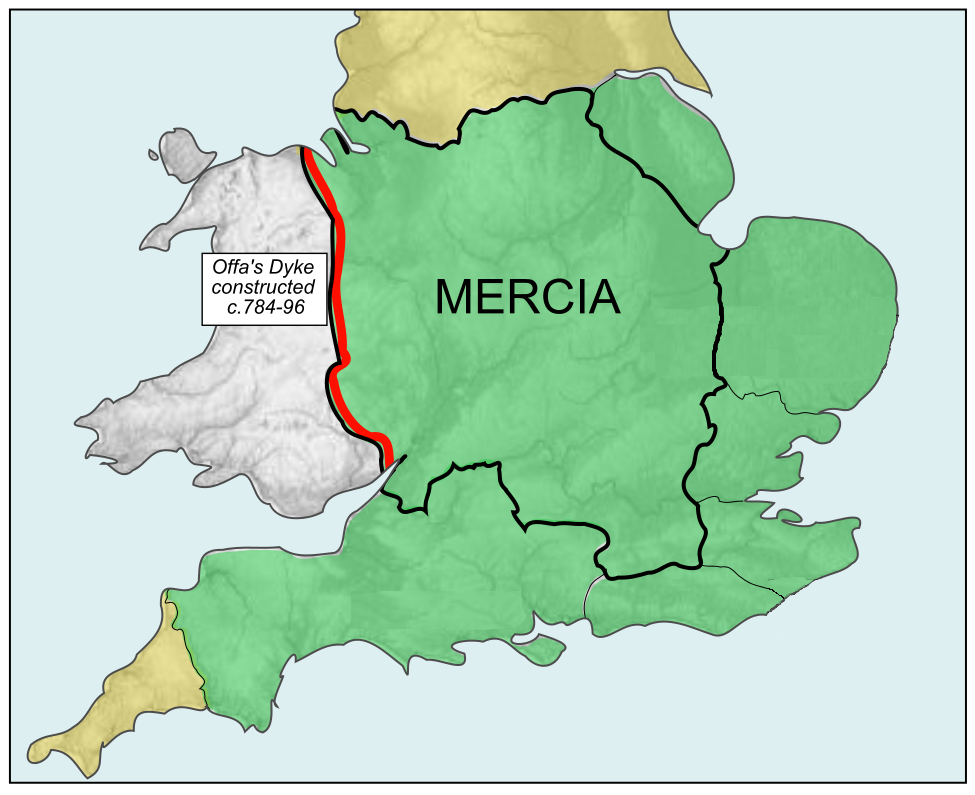
- The Kingdom of Mercia (thick line) and the kingdom's greatest extent during the Mercian Supremacy (green shading)
- Status: Independent kingdom (527–879); Client state of Wessex (879–918)
- Official languages: Mercian Old English
- Religion: Anglo-Saxon paganism (before 7th century); Chalcedonian Christianity (after 7th century)
- Monarch
  - 527–c. 535: Icel (first)
  - c. 626–655: Penda
  - 658–675: Wulfhere
  - 716–757: Æthelbald
  - 757–796: Offa
  - 796–821: Coenwulf
  - 821–823: Ceolwulf
  - 823–826: Beornwulf
  - 852–874: Burgred
  - 874 – c. 879: Ceolwulf II
- Legislature: Witan
- Historical era: Anglo-Saxon England
  - Established: 527
  - Annexed by Wessex: 918
- Currency: Sceat; Penny
Preceded by
Sub-Roman Britain
Hwicce
Kingdom of Lindsey
Succeeded by
Kingdom of England
- Today part of: United Kingdom

Mercia (/ˈmɜːrsiə, -ʃə/) was an early medieval Anglo-Saxon kingdom, one of the seven kingdoms of the Anglo-Saxon period. It was centred on the River Trent and its tributaries, in a region now known as the Midlands of England.

The royal court moved around the kingdom without a fixed capital city. Early in its existence Repton seems to have been the location of an important royal estate. According to the Anglo-Saxon Chronicle, the Great Heathen Army deposed the King of Mercia from Repton in 873–874. Slightly earlier, King Offa seems to have favoured Tamworth. He was crowned there, and Tamworth is where he resided during multiple Christmases.

For the three centuries between 600 and 900, known as Mercian Supremacy or the "Golden Age of Mercia", having annexed or gained submissions from five of the other six kingdoms of the Heptarchy (East Anglia, Essex, Kent, Sussex and Wessex), Mercia dominated England south of the Humber estuary. During King Offa's reign, a dyke was created as the boundary between Mercia and the Welsh kingdoms. Nicholas Brooks noted that "the Mercians stand out as by far the most successful of the various early Anglo-Saxon peoples until the later ninth century", and some historians, such as Sir Frank Stenton, believe the unification of England south of the Humber estuary was achieved during Offa's reign.

King Peada converted to Christianity around 656. The Diocese of Mercia was founded in this year, with the first bishop (Diuma) based at Repton. The religion was firmly established in the kingdom by the late 7th century. After 13 years at Repton, in 669, Saint Chad (the fifth bishop) moved the bishopric to Lichfield and, in 691, the Diocese of Mercia became the Diocese of Lichfield. There has been a diocese based in the city ever since. For a brief period between 787 and 799 or 803 the diocese was an archbishopric. The current bishop, Michael Ipgrave, is the 99th since the diocese was established.

At the end of the 9th century, following the invasions of the Vikings and their Great Heathen Army, Danelaw absorbed much of the former Mercian territory. Danelaw at its height included London, all of East Anglia and most of the North of England.

The final Mercian king, Ceolwulf II, died in 879 with the kingdom appearing to have lost its political independence. Initially, it was ruled by a lord or ealdorman under the overlordship of Alfred the Great, who styled himself "King of the Anglo-Saxons". The kingdom had a brief period of independence in the mid-10th century and in 1016, by which time it was viewed as a province with temporary independence. Wessex conquered and united all the kingdoms into the Kingdom of England. The kingdom became an earldom until 1071.

== History ==
=== Early history ===
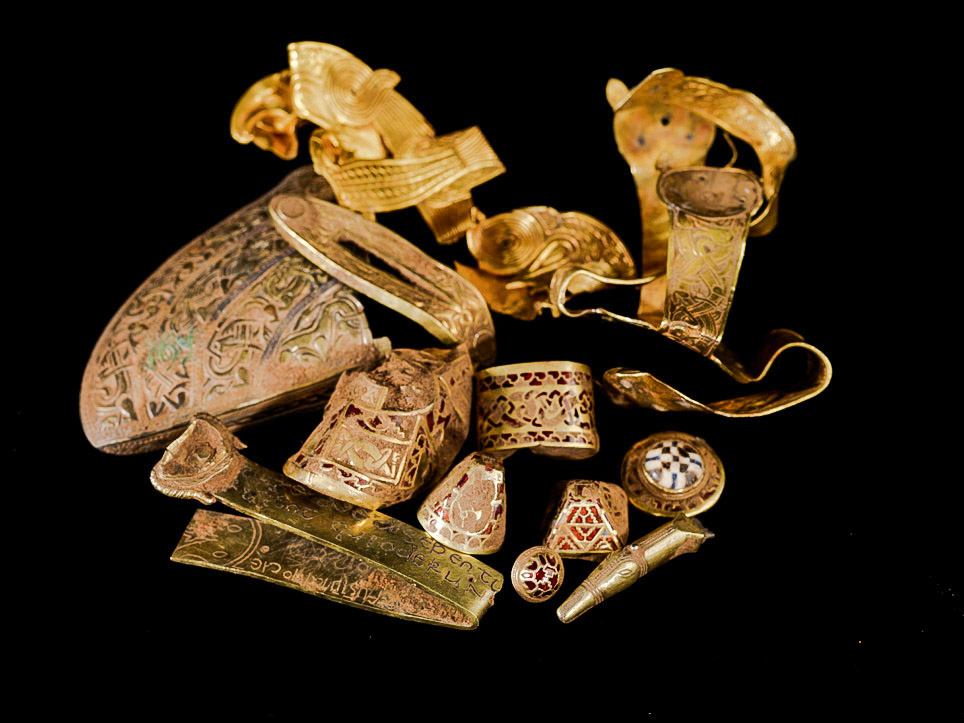
The Staffordshire Hoard, discovered in a field in Hammerwich, near Lichfield in July 2009, is perhaps the most important collection of Anglo-Saxon objects found in England

Mercia's exact evolution at the start of the Anglo-Saxon era remains more obscure than that of Northumbria, Kent, or even Wessex. Mercia developed an effective political structure and was Christianised later than the other kingdoms. Archaeological surveys show that Angles settled the lands north of the River Thames by the 6th century. The name "Mercia" is Mercian Old English for "boundary folk" (see Welsh Marches), and the traditional interpretation is that the kingdom originated along the frontier between the native Brythonic-speaking Romano-British Welsh and the Anglo-Saxon invaders. However, Peter Hunter Blair argued an alternative interpretation: that they emerged along the frontier between Northumbria and the inhabitants of the Trent river valley.

Although its earliest boundaries remain obscure, a general agreement persists that the territory that was called "the first of the Mercians" in the Tribal Hidage covered much of south Derbyshire, Leicestershire, Nottinghamshire, Northamptonshire, Staffordshire and northern Warwickshire.

The earliest person named in any records as a king of Mercia is Creoda, said to have been the great-grandson of Icel. Coming to power around 584, he built a fortress at Tamworth which became the seat of Mercia's kings. His son Pybba succeeded him in 593. Cearl, a kinsman of Creoda, followed Pybba in 606; in 615, Cearl gave his daughter Cwenburga in marriage to Edwin, king of Deira, whom he had sheltered while he was an exiled prince.

The Mercian kings were the only Anglo-Saxon Heptarchy ruling house known to claim a direct family link with a pre-migration Continental Germanic monarchy.

=== Penda and the Mercian Supremacy ===
Mercia and the main Anglo-Saxon kingdoms at about 600

The next Mercian king, Penda, ruled from about 626 or 633 until 655. Some of what is known about Penda comes from the hostile account of Bede, who disliked him – both as an enemy to Bede's own Northumbria and as a pagan. However, Bede acknowledges that Penda freely allowed Christian missionaries from Lindisfarne into Mercia and did not restrain them from preaching. In 633 Penda and his ally Cadwallon of Gwynedd defeated and killed Edwin, who had become not only ruler of the newly unified Northumbria, but bretwalda, or high king, over the southern kingdoms. When another Northumbrian king, Oswald, arose and again claimed overlordship of the south, he too was defeated and killed at the hands of Penda and his allies – in 642 at the Battle of Maserfield. In 655, after a period of confusion in Northumbria, Penda brought 30 sub-kings to fight the new Northumbrian king Oswiu at the Battle of Winwaed, in which Penda in turn lost the battle and his life.

The battle led to a temporary collapse of Mercian power. Penda's son Peada, who had converted to Christianity at Repton in 653, succeeded his father as king of Mercia; Oswiu set up Peada as an under-king; but in the spring of 656 he was murdered and Oswiu assumed direct control of the whole of Mercia. A Mercian revolt in 658 threw off Northumbrian domination and resulted in the appearance of another son of Penda, Wulfhere, who ruled Mercia as an independent kingdom (though he apparently continued to render tribute to Northumbria for a while) until his death in 675. Wulfhere initially succeeded in restoring the power of Mercia, but the end of his reign saw a serious defeat by Northumbria. The next king, Æthelred, defeated Northumbria in the Battle of the Trent in 679, settling once and for all the long-disputed control of the former kingdom of Lindsey. Æthelred was succeeded by Cœnred, son of Wulfhere; both these kings became better known for their religious activities than anything else, but the king who succeeded them in 709, Ceolred, is said in a letter of Saint Boniface to have been a dissolute youth who died insane. So ended the rule of the direct descendants of Penda.

At some point before the accession of Æthelbald in 716 the Mercians conquered the region around Wroxeter, known to the Welsh as Pengwern or as "The Paradise of Powys". Elegies written in the persona of its dispossessed rulers record the sorrow at this loss.

A series of maps that illustrate the increasing hegemony of Mercia during the 8th century

The next important king of Mercia, Æthelbald, reigned from 716 to 757. For the first few years of his reign he had to face two strong rival kings, Wihtred of Kent and Ine of Wessex. But when Wihtred died in 725, and Ine abdicated in 726 to become a monk in Rome, Æthelbald was free to establish Mercia's hegemony over the rest of the Anglo-Saxons south of the Humber. Æthelbald suffered a setback in 752, when the West Saxons under Cuthred defeated him, but he seems to have restored his supremacy over Wessex by 757.

In July 2009, the Staffordshire Hoard of Anglo-Saxon gold was discovered by Terry Herbert in a field at Hammerwich, near Brownhills and close to Lichfield in Staffordshire. Lichfield functioned as the religious centre of Mercia. The artefacts have tentatively been dated by Svante Fischer and Jean Soulat to the 7th–8th centuries. Whether the hoard was deposited by Anglo-Saxon pagans or Christians remains unclear, as does the purpose of the deposit.

=== Reign of Offa and rise of Wessex ===
A mention of Mercia in the Anglo-Saxon Chronicle

After the murder of Æthelbald by one of his bodyguards in 757, a civil war broke out which concluded with the victory of Offa, a descendant of Pybba. Offa (reigned 757 to 796) had to build anew the hegemony which his predecessor had exercised over the southern English, and he did this so successfully that he became the greatest king Mercia had ever known. Not only did he win battles and dominate Southern England, but also he took an active hand in administering the affairs of his kingdom, founding market towns and overseeing the first major issues of gold coins in Britain; he assumed a role in the administration of the Catholic Church in England (sponsoring the short-lived archbishopric of Lichfield, 787 to 799), and even negotiated with Charlemagne as an equal. Offa is credited with the construction of Offa's Dyke, which marked the border between Wales and Mercia.

Offa exerted himself to ensure that his son Ecgfrith of Mercia would succeed him, but after Offa's death in July 796 Ecgfrith survived for only five months, and the kingdom passed to a distant relative named Coenwulf in December 796. In 821 Coenwulf's brother Ceolwulf succeeded to the Mercian kingship; he demonstrated his military prowess by his attack on and destruction of the fortress of Deganwy in Gwynedd. The power of the West Saxons under Egbert (King of Wessex from 802 to 839) grew during this period, however, and in 825 Egbert defeated the Mercian king Beornwulf (who had overthrown Ceolwulf in 823) at Ellendun.

The Battle of Ellendun proved decisive. At this point, Mercia lost control of Kent, Sussex, Surrey, and possibly also Essex. Beornwulf was slain while suppressing a revolt amongst the East Angles, and his successor, a former ealdorman named Ludeca (reigned 826–827), met the same fate. Another ealdorman, Wiglaf, subsequently ruled for less than two years before Egbert of Wessex drove him out of Mercia. In 830 Wiglaf regained independence for Mercia, but by this time Wessex had clearly become the dominant power in England. Circa 840 Beorhtwulf succeeded Wiglaf.

=== Arrival of the Danes ===
The Five Boroughs and English Mercia in the early 10th century

In 852, Burgred came to the throne, and with Ethelwulf of Wessex subjugated North Wales. In 868 Danish invaders occupied Nottingham. The Danes drove Burgred from his kingdom in 874 and Ceolwulf II took his place. In 877 the Danes seized the eastern part of Mercia, which became part of the Danelaw. Ceolwulf, the last king of Mercia, left with the western half, reigned until 879. From about 883 until his death in 911 Æthelred, Lord of the Mercians, ruled Mercia under the overlordship of Wessex. Alfred changed his title from 'king of the West Saxons' to 'king of the Anglo-Saxons' to reflect the acceptance of his overlordship of all southern England not under Danish rule. All coins struck in Mercia after the disappearance of Ceolwulf in c. 879 were in the name of the West Saxon king. Æthelred had married Æthelflæd (c. 870 – 12 June 918), daughter of Alfred the Great of Wessex (r. 871–899), and she assumed power when her husband became ill at some time in the last ten years of his life.

After Æthelred's death in 911 Æthelflæd ruled as "Lady of the Mercians", but Alfred's successor as King of the Anglo-Saxons, Edward the Elder (r. 899–924), took control of London and Oxford, which Alfred had placed under Æthelred's control. Æthelflæd and her brother continued Alfred's policy of building fortified burhs, and by 918 they had conquered the southern Danelaw in East Anglia and Danish Mercia.

=== Loss of independence ===
When Æthelflæd died in 918, Ælfwynn, her daughter by Æthelred, succeeded as "Second Lady of the Mercians", but within six months Edward had deprived her of all authority in Mercia and taken her to Wessex. Edward was succeeded as king of the Anglo-Saxons by his eldest son Æthelstan (r. 924–939), who had been brought up in Mercia, and he was immediately accepted as king, but not in Wessex until the following year. In 927 he conquered Northumbria and thus became the first king of all England. Mercia briefly regained a political existence separate from Wessex in 955–959, when Edgar became king of Mercia, and again in 1016, when Cnut and Edmund Ironside divided the English kingdom between themselves, with Cnut taking Mercia. Mercia maintained its separate identity as an earldom until the Norman Conquest in 1066.

== Mercian Old English ==
The name 'Mercia' is a Latinisation of an Old English word derived from the Mercian Old English, Merce, meaning "borderland". The dialect thrived between the 8th and 13th centuries and was referred to by John Trevisa, writing in 1387:

For men of the est with men of the west, as it were undir the same partie of hevene, acordeth more in sownynge of speche than men of the north with men of the south, therfore it is that Mercii, that beeth men of myddel Engelond, as it were parteners of the endes, understondeth better the side langages, northerne and southerne, than northerne and southerne understondeth either other...

J. R. R. Tolkien is one of many scholars who have studied and promoted the Mercian dialect of Old English and introduced various Mercian terms into his legendarium – especially in relation to the Kingdom of Rohan, otherwise known as the Mark (a name cognate with Mercia). The Mercian dialect is the basis of Tolkien's language of Rohan, and a number of its kings are given the same names as monarchs who appear in the Mercian royal genealogy, e.g., Fréawine, Fréaláf and Éomer (see List of kings of the Angles).

== Mercian prose ==
During the ninth century, Mercia was a major centre for the production of Old English prose texts, including translations of Bede's Ecclesiastical History, Felix's Life of Guthlac and Gregory the Great's Dialogues, as well as works such as the Old English Martyrology.

== Mercian religion ==
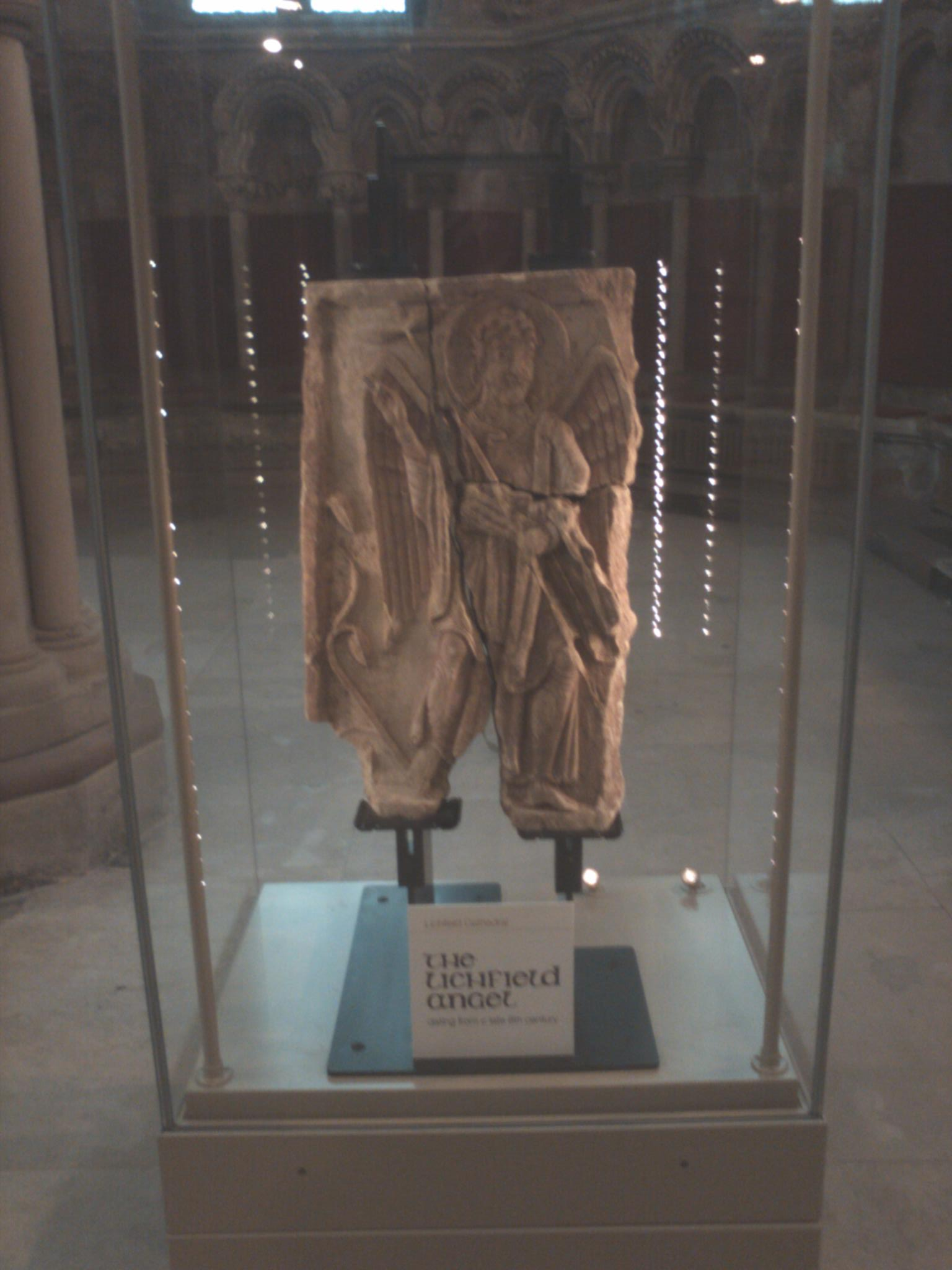
The Lichfield Angel carving

The first kings of Mercia were pagans, and they resisted the encroachment of Christianity longer than other kingdoms in the Anglo-Saxon Heptarchy.

Mercian rulers remained resolutely pagan until the reign of Peada in 656, although this did not prevent them joining coalitions with Christian Welsh rulers to resist Northumbria. The first appearance of Christianity in Mercia, however, had come at least thirty years earlier, following the Battle of Cirencester of 628, when Penda incorporated the formerly West Saxon territories of Hwicce into his kingdom.

The conversion of Mercia to Christianity occurred in the latter part of the 7th century, and by the time of Penda's defeat and death, Mercia was largely surrounded by Christian states. Diuma, an Irish monk and one of Oswiu's missionaries, was subsequently ordained a bishop – the first to operate in Mercia. Christianity finally gained a foothold in Mercia when Oswiu supported Peada as sub-king of the Middle Angles, requiring him to marry Oswiu's daughter, Alchflaed, and to accept her religion.

Decisive steps to Christianise Mercia were taken by Chad (Latinised by Bede as Ceadda), the fifth bishop to operate in Mercia. This controversial figure was given land by King Wulfhere to build a monastery at Lichfield. Evidence suggests that the Lichfield Gospels were made in Lichfield around 730. As in other Anglo-Saxon kingdoms, the many small monasteries established by the Mercian kings allowed the political/military and ecclesiastical leadership to consolidate their unity through bonds of kinship.

== Subdivisions of Mercia ==
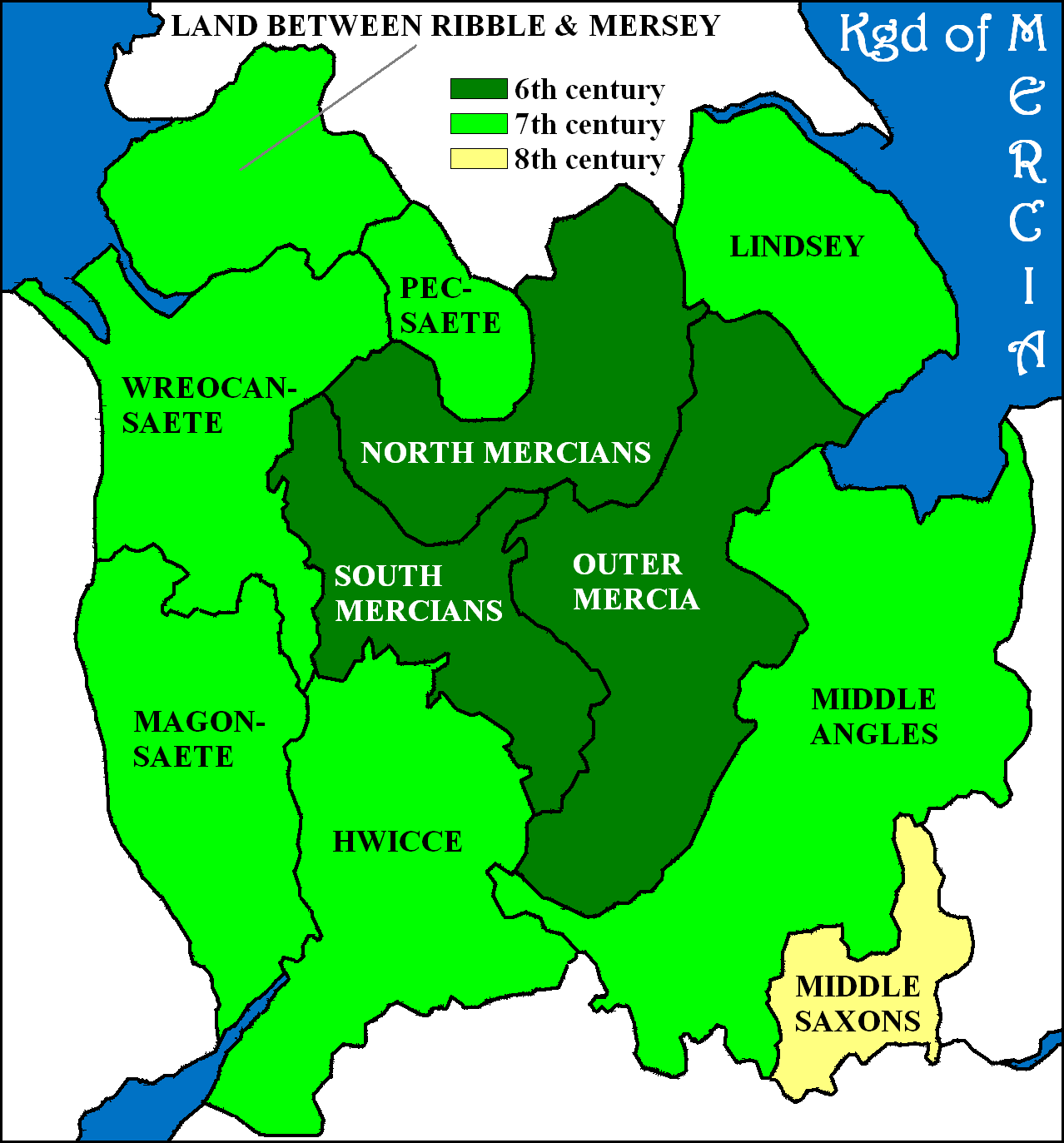
Subdivisions of Mercia

Mercian monasteries

For knowledge of the internal composition of the Kingdom of Mercia, we must rely on a document of uncertain age (possibly late 7th century), known as the Tribal Hidage – an assessment of the extent (but not the location) of land owned (reckoned in hides), and therefore the military obligations and perhaps taxes due, by each of the Mercian tribes and subject kingdoms by name. This hidage exists in several manuscript versions, some as late as the 14th century. It lists a number of peoples, such as the Hwicce, who have now vanished, except for reminders in various placenames. The major subdivisions of Mercia were as follows:

- South Mercians

The Mercians dwelling south of the River Trent. Folk groups within included the Tomsæte around Tamworth and the Pencersæte around Penkridge (roughly corresponding to southern Staffordshire and northern Warwickshire).

- North Mercians

The Mercians dwelling north of the River Trent (roughly corresponding to eastern Staffordshire, Derbyshire and Nottinghamshire).

- Outer Mercia

An early phase of Mercian expansion, possibly 6th century (roughly corresponding to southern Lincolnshire, Leicestershire, Rutland, Northamptonshire and Oxfordshire).

- Lindsey

Once a kingdom in its own right, disputed with Northumbria in the 7th century before finally coming under Mercian control (roughly corresponding to the historic riding of Lindsey in Lincolnshire).

- Middle Angles

A collection of many smaller folk groups under Mercian control from the 7th century, including the Spaldingas around Spalding, the Bilmingas and Wideringas near Stamford, the North Gyrwe and South Gyrwe near Peterborough, the West Wixna, East Wixna, West Wille and East Wille near Ely, the Sweordora, Hurstingas and Gifle near Bedford, the Hicce around Hitchin, the Cilternsæte in the Chilterns and the Feppingas near Thame (roughly corresponding to Cambridgeshire, Bedfordshire, Hertfordshire, Buckinghamshire and southern Oxfordshire).

- Hwicce

Once a kingdom in its own right, disputed with Wessex in the 7th century before finally coming under Mercian control. Smaller folk groups within included the Stoppingas around Warwick and the Arosæte near Droitwich (roughly corresponding to Gloucestershire, Worcestershire and southern Warwickshire).

- Magonsæte

A people of the Welsh border, also known as the Westerna, under Mercian control from the 7th century. Smaller folk groups within included the Temersæte near Hereford and the Hahlsæte near Ludlow (roughly corresponding to Herefordshire and southern Shropshire).

- Wreocansæte

A people of the Welsh border under Mercian control from the 7th century. Smaller folk groups within included the Rhiwsæte near Wroxeter and the Meresæte near Chester (roughly corresponding to northern Shropshire, Flintshire and Cheshire).

- Pecsæte

An isolated folk group of the Peak District, under Mercian control from the 7th century (roughly corresponding to northern Derbyshire).

- Land Between Ribble and Mersey

A disorganised region under Mercian control from the 7th century (roughly corresponding to Merseyside, Greater Manchester, and Lancashire south of the River Ribble). It was the most northern extent of the kingdom, and at certain times was claimed by Northumbria and Danelaw.

- Middle Saxons

Taken over from Essex in the 8th century, including London (roughly corresponding to Greater London, Hertfordshire, and Surrey).

After Mercia was annexed by Wessex in the early 10th century, the West Saxon rulers divided it into shires modelled after their own system, cutting across traditional Mercian divisions. These shires survived mostly intact until 1974, and even today still largely follow their original boundaries.

== Modern uses of the name Mercia ==
The term "midlands" is first recorded (as mydlonde-shiris) in 1475. John Bateman, writing in 1876 or 1883, referred to contemporary Cheshire and Staffordshire landholdings as being in Mercia. The most credible source for the idea of a contemporary Mercia is Thomas Hardy's Wessex novels. The first of these appeared in 1874 and Hardy himself considered it the origin of the conceit of a contemporary Wessex. Bram Stoker set his 1911 novel The Lair of the White Worm in a contemporary Mercia that may have been influenced by Hardy, whose secretary was a friend of Stoker's brother. Although 'Edwardian Mercia' never had the success of 'Victorian Wessex', it was an idea that appealed to the higher echelons of society. In 1908 Sir Oliver Lodge, Principal of Birmingham University, wrote to his counterpart at Bristol, welcoming a new university worthy of "...the great Province of Wessex whose higher educational needs it will supply. It will be no rival, but colleague and co-worker with this university, whose province is Mercia...".

The British Army has made use of several regional identities in naming larger, amalgamated formations. After the Second World War, the infantry regiments of Cheshire, Staffordshire and Worcestershire were organised in the Mercian Brigade (1948–1968). Today, "Mercia" appears in the titles of two regiments, the Mercian Regiment, founded in 2007, which recruits in Cheshire, Derbyshire, Nottinghamshire, Worcestershire, and parts of Greater Manchester and the West Midlands, and the Royal Mercian and Lancastrian Yeomanry, founded in 1992 as part of the Territorial Army. In 1967, the police forces of Herefordshire, Shropshire and Worcestershire were combined into the West Mercia Constabulary, which changed its name to West Mercia Police in 2009.

Telephone directories across the Midlands include a large number of commercial and voluntary organisations using "Mercia" in their names, and in 2012 a new football league was formed called the Mercian Regional Football League.

Hits Radio Coventry & Warwickshire, a commercial radio station, was originally launched in 1980 as Mercia Sound, later becoming Mercia FM, and then Mercia.

== Symbolism and attributed heraldry ==
Cross of St Alban

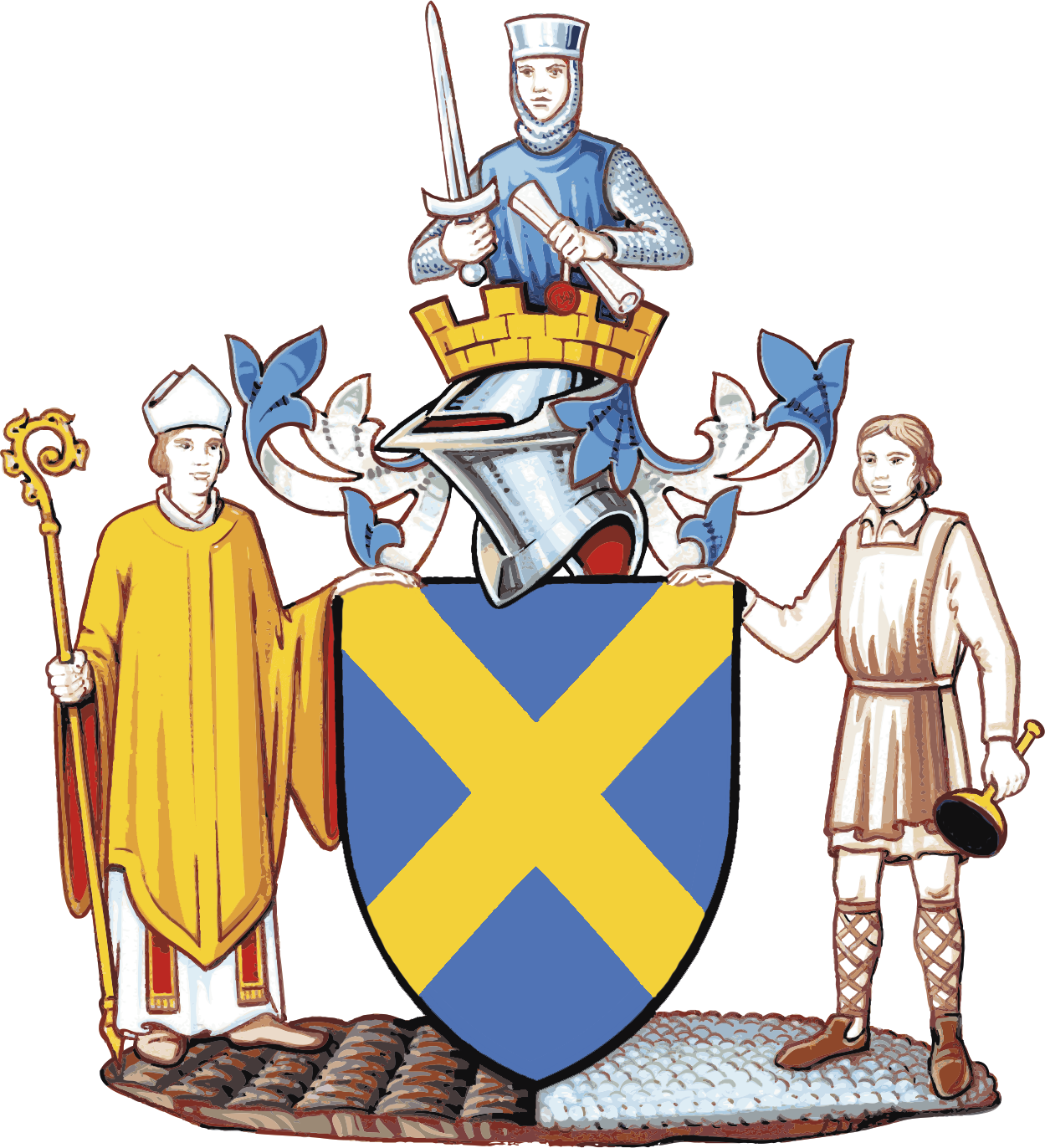
Arms of St Albans City Council

There is no authentic indigenous Mercian heraldic device, as heraldry did not develop in any recognizable form until the High Middle Ages.

The saltire as a symbol of Mercia may have been in use since the time of King Offa. By the 13th century, the saltire had become the attributed arms of the Kingdom of Mercia. The arms are blazoned Azure, a saltire Or, meaning a gold (or yellow) saltire on a blue field. The arms were subsequently used by the Abbey of St Albans, founded by King Offa of Mercia. With the dissolution of the Abbey and the incorporation of the borough of St Albans the device was used on the town's corporate seal and was officially recorded as the arms of the town at an heraldic visitation in 1634.

The saltire is used as both a flag and a coat of arms. As a flag, it is flown from Tamworth Castle, the ancient seat of the Mercian Kings, to this day.

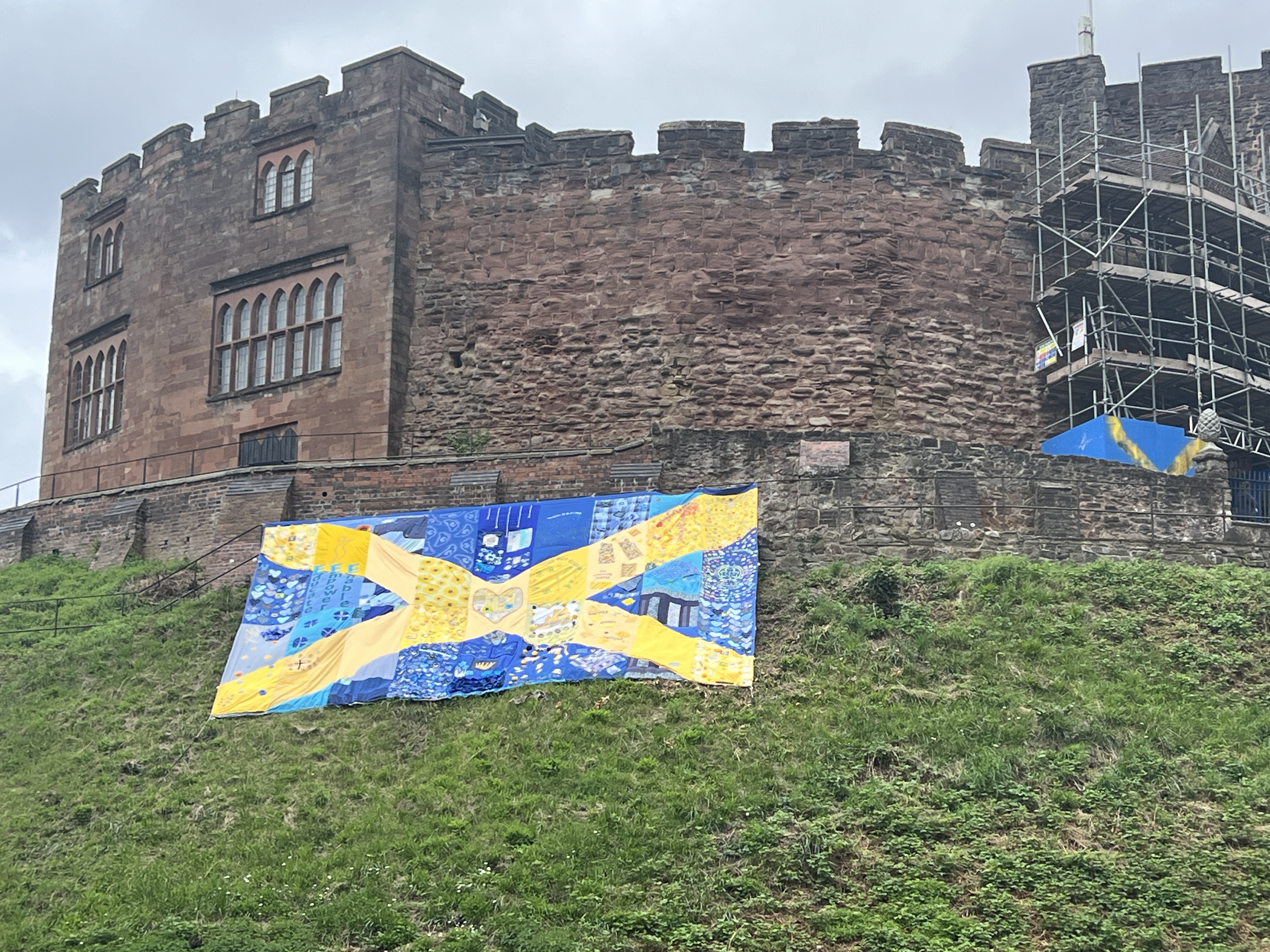
Giant Mercia flag on Tamworth castle created by community groups in 2024

The flag also appears on street signs welcoming people to Tamworth, the "ancient capital of Mercia". It was also flown outside Birmingham Council House during 2009 while the Staffordshire Hoard was on display in the city before being taken to the British Museum in London. The cross has been incorporated into a number of coats of arms of Mercian towns, including Tamworth, Leek and Blaby. It was recognised as the Mercian flag by the Flag Institute in 2014.

The silver double-headed eagle surmounted by a golden three-pronged Saxon crown has been used by several units of the British Army as a heraldic device for Mercia since 1958, including the Mercian Regiment. It is derived from the attributed arms of Leofric, Earl of Mercia in the 11th century. Leofric is sometimes attributed a black, single-headed eagle instead.

The wyvern, a type of dragon, came to have a strong association with Mercia in the 19th century. The Midland Railway, which used a white (silver) wyvern sans legs (legless) as its crest, having inherited it from the Leicester and Swannington Railway, asserted that the "wyvern was the standard of the Kingdom of Mercia", and that it was "a quartering in the town arms of Leicester". The symbol appeared on numerous stations and other company buildings in the region, and was worn as a silver badge by all uniformed employees. However, in 1897 the Railway Magazine noted that there appeared "to be no foundation that the wyvern was associated with the Kingdom of Mercia". It has been associated with Leicester since the time of Thomas, 2nd Earl of Lancaster and Leicester (c. 1278–1322), the most powerful lord in the Midlands, who used it as his personal crest, and was recorded in a heraldic visitation of the town in 1619.

In Bram Stoker's 1911 novel The Lair of the White Worm, explicitly set in Mercia (see above), the Mercian white wyvern sans legs of the Midland Railway was transformed into a monstrous beast, the eponymous worm of the title. The word "worm" is derived from Old English wyrm and originally referred to a dragon or serpent. "Wyvern" derives from Old Saxon wivere, also meaning serpent, and is etymologically related to viper.

The ultimate source for the symbolism of white dragons in England would appear to be Geoffrey of Monmouth's fictional work, The History of the Kings of Britain (c. 1136), which recounts an incident in the life of Merlin where a red dragon is seen fighting a white dragon and prevailing. The red dragon was taken to represent the Welsh and their eventual victory over the Anglo-Saxon invaders, symbolised by the white dragon.

The philologist and Tolkien scholar Tom Shippey has suggested that the Middle Kingdom in J. R. R. Tolkien's Farmer Giles of Ham, a story dominated by a dragon, is based on Mercia, the part of England where Tolkien grew up. This dragon, Chrysophylax, though mostly hostile, eventually helps Giles found a realm of his own, the Little Kingdom. Shippey states further that "the Mark", the land of the Riders of Rohan – all of whom have names in the Mercian dialect of Old English – was once the usual term for central England, and it would have been pronounced and written "marc" rather than the West Saxon "mearc" or the Latinized "Mercia".

== See also ==
- Lichfield
- List of monarchs of Mercia
- List of Anglo-Saxon Mercians
- Mercian Old English
- Mercian Trail
- Old English
- Repton Abbey
- Staffordshire Hoard
- Tamworth, Staffordshire
- Wessex

== Sources ==
- Bateman, John (1971). The Great Landowners of Great Britain and Ireland. Leicester University Press. ISBN 0-391-00157-4.
- Cottle, Basil; Sherborne, J.W. (1951). The Life of a University. University of Bristol. OCLC 490908616.
- Dow, George (1973). Railway Heraldry: and other insignia. Newton Abbot: David and Charles. ISBN 978-0715358962.
- Elmes, Simon (2005). Talking for Britain: A Journey Through the Nation's Dialects. Penguin. ISBN 0-14-051562-3.
- Evans, Geraint; Fulton, Helen (2019). The Cambridge History of Welsh Literature. Cambridge University Press. ISBN 978-1107106765.
- Falkus, Malcolm; Gillingham, John (1989). Historical Atlas of Britain. Kingfisher. ISBN 0-86272-295-0.
- Fox-Davies, Arthur Charles (1909). A Complete Guide to Heraldry. London: T.C. & E.C. Jack. LCCN 09023803 – via Internet Archive.
- Hunter Blair, Peter (1948). The Northumbrians and their Southern Frontier. Archaeologia Aeliana, 4th series 26. pp. 98–126. DOI: https://doi.org/10.5284/1060107
- Rauer, Christine (2025). Mercian Prose: A Short Introduction. Resources for Old English Prose, University of Oxford.
- Thacker, Alan (2005). "England in the Seventh Century". In Fouracre, Paul (ed.). The New Cambridge Medieval History. Vol. c. 500 – c. 700. Cambridge: Cambridge University Press. ISBN 978-0521362917.
- Zaluckyj, Sarah; Feryok, Marge (2001). Mercia: The Anglo-Saxon Kingdom of Central England. Logaston. ISBN 1-873827-62-8.
