= Racial conceptions of Jewish identity in Zionism =

Use of racial theories for and against Zionism

In the late 19th century, amid attempts to apply science to notions of race, some of the founders of Zionism (such as Max Nordau) sought to reformulate conceptions of Jewishness in terms of racial identity and the "race science" of the time. They believed that this concept would allow them to build a new framework for collective Jewish identity, and thought that biology might provide "proof" for the "ethnonational myth of common descent" from the biblical land of Israel. Countering antisemitic claims that Jews were both aliens and a racially inferior people who needed to be segregated or expelled, these Zionists drew on and appropriated elements from various race theories, to argue that only a Jewish national home could enable the physical regeneration of the Jewish people and a renaissance of pride in their ancient cultural traditions.

The contrasting assimilationist viewpoint was that Jewishness consisted in an attachment to Judaism as a religion and culture. Both the Orthodox and liberal establishments, for different reasons, often rejected this idea. Subsequently, Zionist and non-Zionist Jews vigorously debated aspects of this proposition in terms of the merits or otherwise of diaspora life. While Zionism embarked on its project of social engineering in Mandatory Palestine, ethnonationalist politics on the European continent strengthened and, by the 1930s, some German Jews, acting defensively, asserted Jewish collective rights by redefining Jews as a race after Nazism rose to power. The advent of World War II led to the implementation of the Holocaust's policies of genocidal ethnic cleansing, which, by war's end, had utterly discredited race as the lethal product of pseudoscience.

With the establishment of Israel in 1948, the "ingathering of the exiles", and the Law of Return, the question of Jewish origins and biological unity came to assume particular importance during early nation building. Conscious of this, Israeli medical researchers and geneticists were careful to avoid any language that might resonate with racial ideas. Themes of "blood logic" or "race" have nevertheless been described as a recurrent feature of modern Jewish thought in both scholarship and popular belief. Despite this, many aspects of the role of race in the formation of Zionist concepts of a Jewish identity were rarely addressed until recently.

Questions of how political narratives impact the work of population genetics, and its connection to race, have a particular significance in Jewish history and culture. Genetic studies on the origins of modern Jews have been criticized as "being designed or interpreted in the framework of a 'Zionist narrative'" and as an essentialist approach to biology in a similar manner to criticism of the interpretation of archaeological science in the region. According to Israeli historian of science Nurit Kirsh and Israeli geneticist Raphael Falk, the interpretation of the genetic data has been unconsciously influenced by Zionism. Falk wrote that every generation has witnessed efforts by both Zionist and non-Zionist Jews to seek a link between national and biological aspects of Jewish identity.

== Literature review ==
Though the question is undecided, some trace the start of a biological interpretation of Jewish origins back as far as the Spanish Inquisition. A tradition of thought and ethnography premised on a hierarchy of racial distinctions, though in retrospect known to be a pseudoscience, was deeply entrenched, indeed ubiquitous, among Western scholars by the early twentieth century. It saturated thinking in medicine and anthropology, but assumed particular prominence in the Germanic sphere as opposed to England where, John Efron writes, "Jews as Jews simply failed to arouse British scientific curiosity". (Note: A notable exception was the work of the eugenicist Karl Pearson (Endelman 2004, p. 53).) As participants in modernity, Jewish thinkers and scientists formed an integral part of the scientific world underwriting these theories. The Nazi Holocaust totally discredited concepts of race and, from 1945 onwards, considerable efforts were made to disabuse the world of the prejudicial notion that Jews constituted a race. At the same time, the broader thrust and impact of this discredited world-view long remained insufficiently analysed. (Note: "The history of modern racial thought and the importance of the Jews as one of its objects have received substantial attention, as well as has Jewish engagement with racial thinking. However, the larger significance of this thought both for the history of racial thinking in the West and for modern Jewish history itself is still under-analysed." (Hart 2005, p. 50))

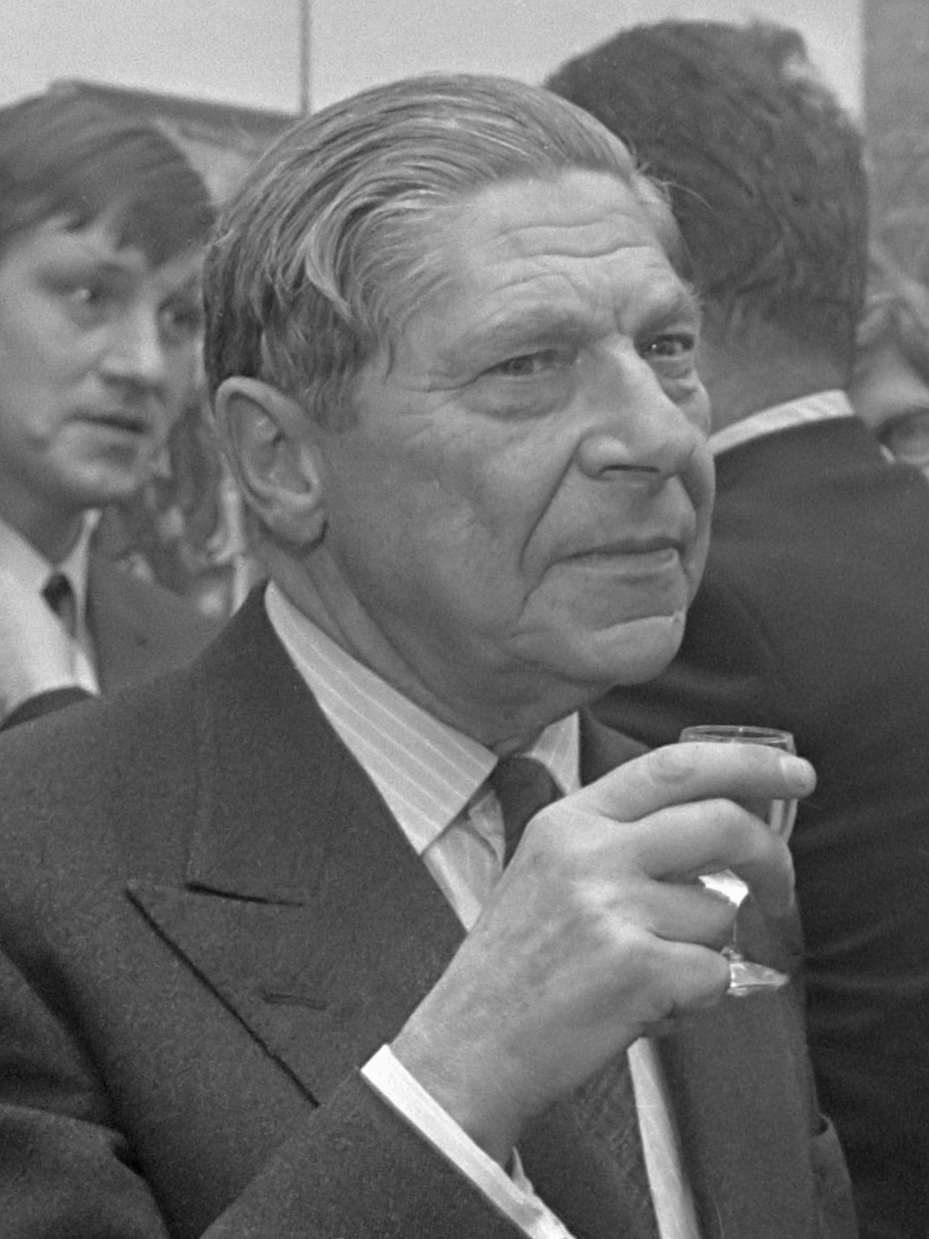
Arthur Koestler, whose 1976 book The Thirteenth Tribe drew Jewish American criticism for advancing theories on Khazar ancestry

Ethnic origins have figured as an indispensable basis for determining what groups belong to the Jewish collective. Admixture by conversion tended to be underplayed in traditional Jewish historiography in contrast to speculations about descendant communities from the biblical Ten Lost Tribes who in theory would belong to the Jewish "blood community". (Note: "Groups that claimed Jewish status through conversion, such as the Khazars in the ninth century or the Himyarites five centuries earlier, fared badly in early Jewish historiography: they were almost totally ignored. But equally remote groups with an imagined bloodline to the Jewish people were of great interest." (Parfitt & Egorova 2005, p. 193)) When Arthur Koestler's The Thirteenth Tribe (1976) propounded the thesis that the origins of the Ashkenazi might be found in the dispersion of the Turkic Khazars, the book encountered a mixed reception within the Jewish American community, which was increasingly adopting Zionism narratives during this time period, and a hostile reception from American Zionists, who condemned the work as "a product of Jewish self-hatred". Though the book's genetic implications are not regarded as tenable, this severity of critical dismissal, according to Elise Burton, reflected an inability or unwillingness to take cognisance of a tradition of a racializing logic in Zionist discussions of a putative Jewish biology. (Note: "the critical response to their works, particularly within the Israeli genetics community, revealed what the authors themselves were unable or perhaps unwilling to recognize: the significant extent to which Zionism, like any other ethnic nationalism, relies on a racializing logic of biological ancestry." (Burton 2022, p. 422)) Though as early as 1967 George Mosse had alluded to the striking similarities between Zionist discourse on race and those made by their völkisch German ethnonationalist antagonists, (Note: "Die Ähnlichkeiten zwischen dem zionistischen Diskurs und demjenigen des völkischen Nationalismus sind in der Tat so frappierend, dass der Historiker George Lachmann Mosse davon sprechen konnte, dass Buber dieselbe Rolle im jüdischen Kontext des fin-de-siècle spielte wie Paul de Lagarde im deutschen Kontext." (Vogt 2014, pp. 435–436); Mosse first outlined the issue in a lecture given at the Leo Baeck Institute in 1967, later revised and reprinted in his 1970 work Germans and Jews) the academic mainstream tended to treat it as a taboo.

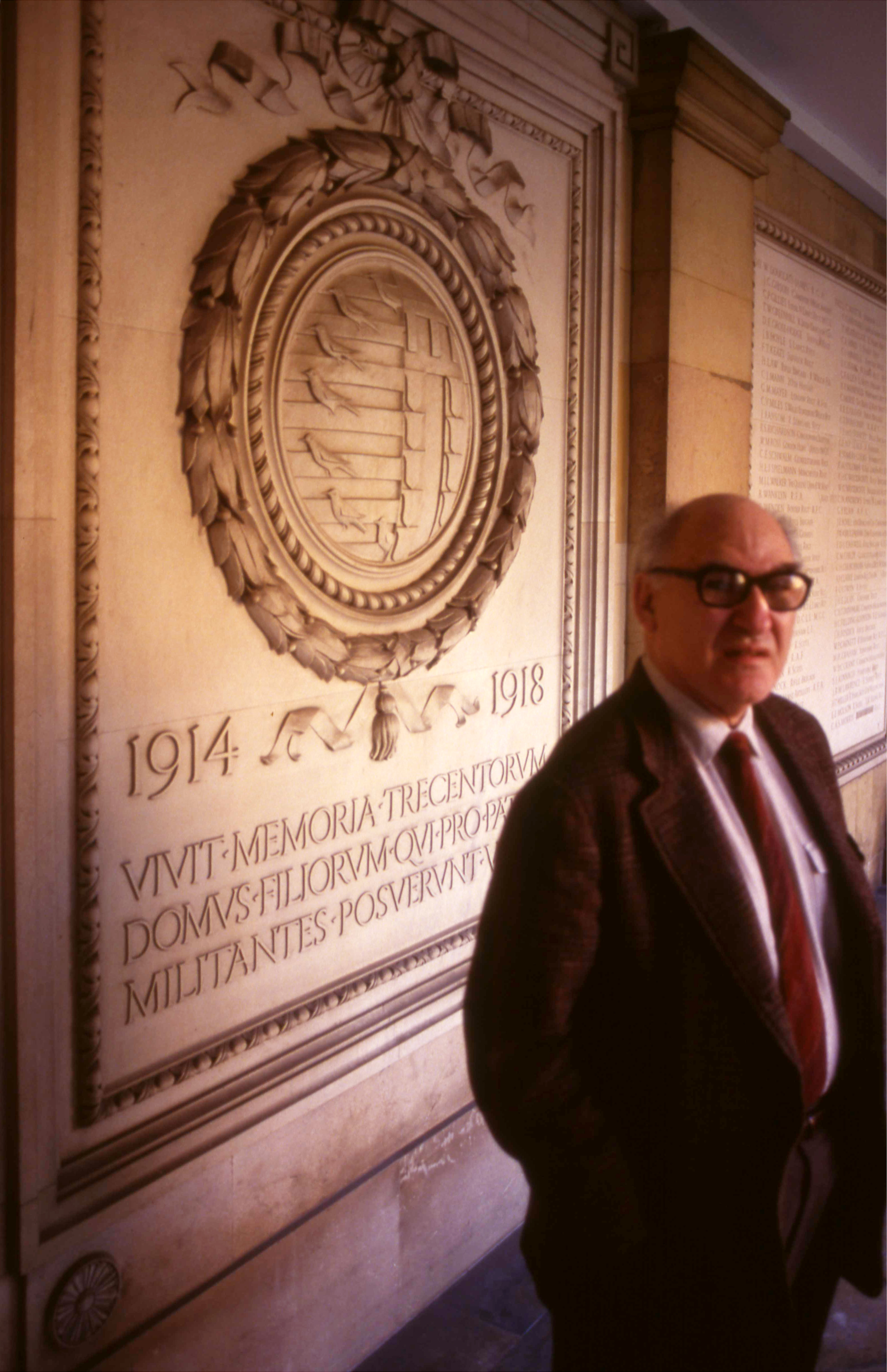
George Mosse, who alluded to similarities between the Zionist discourse on race and that of their German ethnonationalist antagonists

In 1983 the historian Joachim Doron (1923–1993) examined the tradition of acerbic attacks Zionists once mounted against Jews of the diaspora, much of which concerned differing ways of interpreting Jews as a nation/race. Many aspects of the role of race in the formation of Zionist concepts of a Jewish identity were rarely addressed, sidelined or deliberately suppressed until recent decades. (Note: "Jews often defined by enemies or surrounding majorities but Jews themselves have carried on a rich and sometimes rancorous internal dialogue about how Jewishness should be defined." (Sokoloff & Glenn 2011, p. 3)) Doron suggested four reasons for this silence. Firstly, these scathing polemical recriminations by Zionists against other Jews, "the enemy within", overlapped with anti-Semitic arguments about Jews, and recalling them would only play into the hands of modern anti-Semites. Secondly, both Holocaust survivors and veteran settlers had begun to feel nostalgic about the lost world of the shtetl, whose idealization led them to ignore negative characterizations of life in the Pale in the 19th–20th century Jewish/Zionist tradition. Thirdly, as a young nation forging a new Jewish identity with ramifications for the postwar diaspora, a vision emphasizing whatever was positive came to dominate Jewish history in Israel. Finally, the country's growing political isolation encouraged a trend to ignore world opinion, in Ben-Gurion's words, to disregard "what the goyim say". Jewish issues that an earlier Zionist press would have excoriated as "scandalous" came to be dismissed as just expressions of Jewish self-hatred.

Beginning in the 1990s this topical neglect has been gradually addressed in detail, beginning with a German monograph by Annegret Kiefer in 1991, (Note: For a more comprehensive bibliography of early studies see Lipphardt 2008b (Lipphardt 2008b, p. 191, n.4).) and, in English, John Efron's landmark study, Defenders of the Race (1994). Brief notices emerged occasionally hinting at gaps in the record. Mark Gelber, in an aside on his chapter on Nathan Birnbaum, whose racialist ideas had a seminal impact on Cultural Zionism, remarked in 2000 that the "racialist orientation" of Birnbaum's student Martin Buber had been "relativized or sometimes even suppressed in scholarly literature and other commentary about him". (Note: "It is fair to say that a racialist orientation was fundamental to German Cultural Zionism." (Gelber 2000, p. 125)) In the same year Mitchell Hart, on the heels of his 1999 essay, explored these themes in terms of social science in a book-length study. Many studies began to fill the lacuna, by examining the racial thinking embedded in the national ideology constructed around Jews in its formative period. By 2013, Doron Avraham noted that a number of studies had explored Jews' self-"racialization" in relation to the fin-de-siècle period, although later periods remained less researched.

Some of this scholarship made connections between earlier Zionist understanding of race and more recent genetic debates in Israel. Nurit Kirsh wrote in 2004 that investigations into the biology of the Jews had rarely been explored for two decades after the state's establishment, and argued that Zionist ideology had been so internalized by scientists that the myths remained as unconscious influences on their approach to the subject of population genetics. (Note: "What makes population genetics in Israel in the 1950s an interesting and unique case is the unconscious internalization of an ideology by a group of scientists. Because the Zionist ideas did not require articulation and the researchers were unaware of the influence of such ideas on their scientific work, they were not critically examined. The myths were not shattered; on the contrary, they were reinforced." (Kirsh 2003, p. 655)) The following year a special issue of Jewish History dedicated several articles to aspects of the topic of Jews and racial classifications, and Tudor Parfitt published his study of the interrelation between genetics and Jewish identity among the Lemba and Bene Israel.

The Israel geneticist and historian of science Raphael Falk argued that explicit racial and eugenic notions linking Jewish nationality and biology were particularly in evidence among Zionist writers, but also among non-Zionists, and have continued, "though in a thinly disguised mode", after the defeat of Nazism to resurface in every generation since. For him "the utilisation of biological arguments as 'evidence' for whatever social, economic, or political notion that has been put forward" remains problematic. Falk comments that he knows of no other example of an ethnic conflict where this effort to prove or disprove the biological belonging of modern Jews to the historical Land of Israel played such a role. (Note: Footnote: "In conflicts like those in the Balkans, in Africa, in India, in South-East Asia or in Northern Ireland, and to some extent even in the Israeli-Arab conflict, a starting point is the existence of distinct ethnic or religious entities that struggle for the same piece of land. On the other hand, except for Nazi efforts to diagnose the biological belonging of individuals to national-ethnic entities, there is no other example known to me like the Zionists' of an intensive effort to prove the immanent biological belonging or non-belonging of communities to what is considered to be the Jewish entity." (Falk 2017, p. 6))

Historian Steven Weitzman writes that postwar genetics worked to distance itself from race science for both scientific and ethical reasons. Weizmann documents the significant and profound differences between genetics and race science, while noting intellectual similarities. (Note: (Weitzman 2019, pp. 273, 280 et seq.): "To accept the critique of genetics as a revived form of race science, there are a lot of things one has to downplay or ignore. One has to minimize the critical role that geneticists played in discrediting the biological category of race after World War II. One has to disbelieve geneticists today when they distinguish their work from race science; and one has to discount important differences between the two kinds of science, including the differences between the concept of race and the notions of 'population' or 'cline' that have eclipsed it". "despite this profound difference from race science, population genetics does carry forward a similar intellectual project... One of the more specific links between race science and genetics, in fact, is the prominent role that Jews play as a subject of research within each field. Even as race science was being discredited after World War II, the Jews were surfacing as a subject of genetic research, and there may be connections between the two kinds of research. Some of the first postwar genetic studies of the Jews during the 1950s and 1960s were undertaken by physicians and geneticists in Israel... It is not clear how conscious early Israeli geneticists were of continuing the kind of research conducted by race scientists just a few decades earlier.") He concludes that some insecurity about the ambiguities of Jewish identity, inflected by social, psychological and political concerns runs through the centuries-long scholarly quest for Jewish origins even to the present. The mystery continues to attract attention, he says, but cannot be solved by scholarship. Attempts to do so, to ground an alternative "creation myth" in scholarship, prove to be tendentious or deleterious.

According to Elise Burton, "Historians and anthropologists have critically examined how the structuring assumptions of Jewish race science in early-twentieth-century Europe and North America, and their relationship to Zionist nationalism, reverberate within the genetic studies of Jewish populations by Israeli scientists from the 1950s to the present." Genetic studies on the origins of modern Jews have been criticized as "being designed or interpreted in the framework of a 'Zionist narrative', as essentializing biology, or both" in a similar manner to criticism of the interpretation of archaeological science in the region. According to Kirsh and Falk, the interpretation of the genetic data has been unconsciously influenced by Zionism and Anti-Zionism.

Noah Tamarkin, assistant professor of Anthropology and Science and Technology studies at Cornell University, in reviewing the literature, writes:

Contemporary geneticists and their critics often consider similar questions and controversies such as those raised in pre-1980s studies based on blood groups, and even earlier biometric studies undertaken by 19th- and early-20th-century eugenicists and their critics. Zionist and anti-Zionist politics significantly inform historical and contemporary Jewish genetics literatures, at times explicitly and more often implicitly in the questions that scholars ask, such as the extent to which Jews constitute a biological community, and the extent to which Jews throughout the world can trace their ancestry to the Middle East.

== History ==
=== Background ===
Traditional Christian Judaeophobia was tempered under the impact of the Age of Enlightenment as a succeeding period of Jewish emancipation in Western civil society took root in the 19th century. Many acculturated Jewish communities (Note: "It is important to remember that both the Zionists and the Nazis referred to them and their various organizations as 'assimilationist'. However, the great majority of these so-called assimilationist German Jews neither sought to deny their Jewish identity nor stopped believing that one could be both Jewish and German at the same time. Ruth Gay's distinction between 'assimilation', implying the total elimination of all distinctions between Jews and the non Jewish majority, and the more relevant term 'acculturation', implying the adoption of language, culture, and social convention, while retaining a distinct, religious and historical identity, can be helpful here." (Nicosia 2010, p. 1, n.2)) integrated into Germanic society, came to consider their Jewishness in terms of their cultural and/or religious heritage. Coinciding with the emergence of Darwinism as a biological science of man and the rise of scientific racism more broadly, the Emancipation period's incremental lowering of traditional socio-cultural discrimination against, and persecution of, Jews faced new challenges. Though there was no intrinsic connection between Darwin's theories and antisemitism, the latter half of the 19th century witnessed the rise of a racial antisemitism (Wilhelm Marr 1873, 1879; Eugen Dühring 1881, for example) which often had scientific pretensions.

In the German cultural world in particular, this retuning of nationalist völkisch thought drew strength from the "biologization" of human differences in the form of theories of organic racial typologies, by seeking an ostensible scientific support in social Darwinism's theory of evolution as a struggle between species. Jewish scholars and scientists were therefore forced to confront the new race science and, in the words of Todd Endelman, "[s]ome disputed the stability and permanence of racial traits and the existence of pure races. Others internalized racial thinking and then unconsciously reworked and subverted its premises. Still others accepted the idea of racial differences but turned conventional stereotypes on their head."

Jewish scientists who espoused assimilation and accepted the broad parameters of the racial paradigm tended to rethink race in terms of Lamarckism, which allowed that environmental factors could modify an inherited genetic makeup. Zionist scientists, contrariwise, were often convinced that the supposed defects of the "Jewish body" were a direct consequence of integration into other societies, and were drawn to an essentialist interpretation of race. For the former, race was a flexible reality amenable to improvement while the latter thought traits engendered by Mendelian principles involved a more rigid scheme of biological determinism. For instance, when the assimilationist Joseph Jacobs "anthropometric research" (i.e., phrenology) suggested in the 1890s that Jews were "brachycephalic," the problem arose as to how to reconcile that apparent result with race scientists' belief that Arabs and Sephardim, as Semites, were "dolichocephalic," if all Jews descended from a Semitic 'race'. One implication was that Jews were thereby not "pure" but the product of racial intermixture. The other possibility was that environment factors could modify physical traits.

=== Early Zionism ===
As the older Christian antisemitic prejudices were reformulated in an age of racialised thinking, some Jews, disappointed with what they perceived to be the failures of full emancipation, began to be drawn to Theodor Herzl's proposed Zionist solution to the quandary. Herzl's Zionism arose in reaction to these renewed antisemitic trends, as an ideology that aimed to reconstruct a distinct Jewish identity along "ethnic"/"volkisch" lines. In doing so, according to Falk, "the Zionists-to-be" challenged the centuries-old tradition among assimilated Jews that they constituted a religious and socio-cultural group by reframing Jewishness in terms of the concept of a nation-race, with Jews conceived of as an "integral biological entity" in what has been called a "racialization of Jewish identity". (Note: Nevertheless, the idea that different Jewish groups around the world are not only culturally similar, but also "genealogically" connected, is still prominent in the public imagination both within and outside Jewish communities. The notion that Jews are a people almost "biologically" related to each other was promoted by early Zionist ideologues (Egorova 2015, p. 354).) Purity of race became a paramount theme of Jewish anthropology. Biological considerations shaped Herzl's own outlook. He likened the Jews of his day to seals, thrown by circumstance into water but, once back on ground, they would refind their legs, and antisemitism itself, a shock treatment, might prove functional in this restoration of Jews to their former selves. (Note: Gilman cites and comments on the following passage: "'The character of the Jews may benefit from anti-Semitism. Education can be achieved only through shock treatment. Darwin's theory of imitation will be validated. The Jews will adapt. They are like seals who have been thrown back into the water by an accident of nature,.. if they return to dry land and manage to stay there for a few generations, their fins will change back to legs.' How different and yet how similar to the appropriation of today's racial arguments in genetic terms." ( Gilman 2010, pp. 10–11; Falk 2017, p. 56))

Zionist physicians and scientists varied notably in the way they used race to illustrate any number of social, economic, or political notions. According to Dafna Hirsch of the Open University of Israel, writing in 2009, many Zionists supported the concept of Jews as a race, often believing it "offered scientific 'proof' of the ethno-nationalist myth of common descent", (Note: Europe, proponents of the idea that the Jews were a race were found mainly in the ranks of Zionists, as the idea implied a common biological nature of the otherwise geographically, linguistically, and culturally divided Jewish people, and offered scientific "proof" of the ethno-nationalist myth of common descent Hirsch 2009, p. 592.) while others used it to emphasise diversity and hierarchy within the Jewish people. The variation of Zionist positions on race has been observed by Todd Endelman in a study of Redcliffe Nathan Salaman, Shneor Zalman Bychowski and Fritz Shimon Bodenheimer who drew on race. (Note: These ideas were not restricted to the German cultural sphere of central Europe. Aside from Redcliffe Nathan Salaman. Anglo-Jewish physicians like Charles Singer and Charles Seligman were not averse to adopting the current language of race. By the 1930s, the latter two were at the forefront of scientists challenging Nazi notions of race. Salaman became a Zionist some time after reaching the conclusion that Jews formed a distinct race, and this belief may have been one of the factors that led him to adopt that ideology. He maintained his views until well after the war (Endelman 2004, pp. 52–92, 69, 83).) The debates over race swung between the two poles, and covered multiple shadings, of a complex typology that opposed two stereotypical kinds of Jewries, the emancipated, modern cravatte (assimilated) Jews of the German cultural sphere and the religiously fervent, trading caftan Jew (Ostjuden), (Note: Herzl though Zionism melded Western and Eastern Jews into one nationality:"Zionism has already brought about something remarkable and heretofore regarded as impossible: a close alliance between the ultra-modern and the ultra-conservative elements of Jewry." (Aschheim 1982, p. 81)) and played a notable role in the arguments that broke out between Zionists and assimilating Jews. Herzl himself dismissed assimilationists who opposed him as "Mauschel", who perhaps were not fully Jewish because of some past miscegenation. (Note: "These irreconcilable, inexplicable antitheses make it seem as though at some dark moment in our history some inferior human material (eine niedrigere Volksmasse) got into our unfortunate people and blended with it." Kornberg 1993, p. 164)

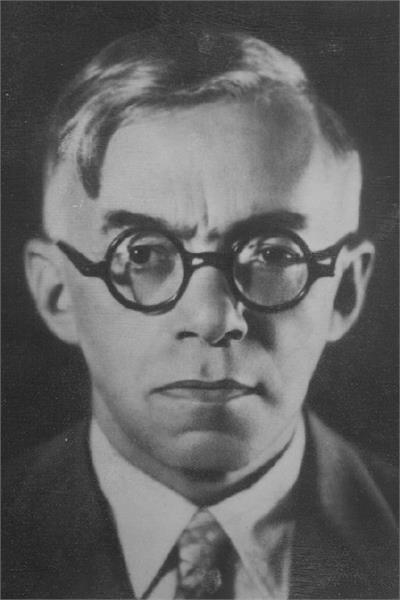
Ze'ev Jabotinsky, an early Zionist who said Jewish national integrity was contingent on "racial purity"

In the early years of the Zionist movement, notable proponents of the idea of a Jewish nation-race included Max Nordau, Herzl's co-founder of the original Zionist Organization, Nathan Birnbaum, one of the founders of Central European Zionism, Arthur Ruppin, and Ze'ev Jabotinsky, the founder of Revisionist Zionism, Nordau, a theorist of muscular Judaism and devoted follower of the theories of Lombroso, wrote that "(t)he acute eye of the street loafer is sufficient proof that the Jews are a race, or at least a variety, or, if you please, a sub-variety of mankind", (Note: Nordau's image is also found in a remark in 1904 by the Jewish physician Aron Sandler (1879–1954), who wrote that, given that "insight of every gutter dwelling lad" [Weisheit eines Gassenbuben] could spot differences in racial types, the idea race reflected an empirical fact. According to Sokoloff and Glenn, it is a common belief among American Jews that they can identitify each other by sight.) a common view advanced by one of the founders of physical anthropology, Johann Friedrich Blumenbach. (Note: Blumenbach, a liberal thinker, thought mankind was composed of five races, but that differences were amenable to change according to diet and climate. The one exception were Jews (Efron 2013, p. 903).) Birnbaum, though he militated against a latent trend in Jewish nationalism that "craved to answer antisemitic nationalist chauvinism in kind", still thought race was the foundation of nationality, Jabotinsky wrote that Jewish national integrity relies on "racial purity", (Note: "A Jew brought up among Germans may assume German customs, German words. He may be wholly imbued with that German fluid but the nucleus of his spiritual structure will always remain Jewish, because his blood, his body, his physical-facial type are Jewish." (Jabotinsky 1961, pp. 37–49)) that "(t)he feeling of national self-identity is ingrained in the man's 'blood', in his physical-racial type, and only in it."

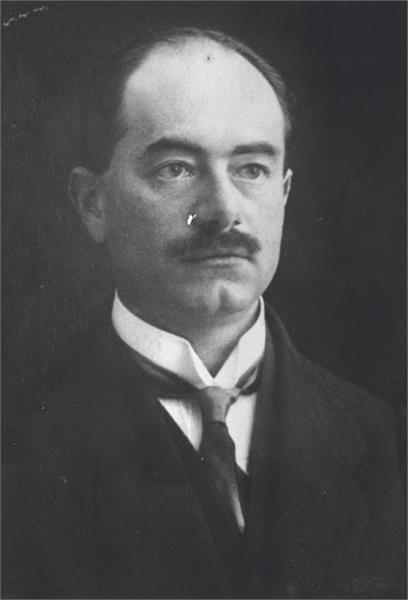
Arthur Ruppin, a German Zionist and proponent of racial theory

From 1908 to 1942, Arthur Ruppin, considered the "father of Israeli sociology", played a central role as director of the Palestine Office (PO) and core organizer of Zionist "colonization" in all of its dimensions from land purchase and banking to settlement policies, education, the establishment of modern Hebrew and the construction of a new Jewish-Zionist identity (Bildung). Ruppin often quoted approvingly from the writings of the foremost Nazi scholars and scientists, (Note: Ruppin enthusiastically quoted the words of many who are regarded in Holocaust historiography as the "Nazi scholars," "Nazi experts," "Nazi professors," "Nazi intellectuals" or "Nazi scientists," and even corresponded and discussed cordially with some of them, mainly because most of them were or pretend to be "primary solution Nazis," and their weltanschauung and basic theories were essentially similar to those of Ruppin. A "primary solution Nazi" was one who subscribed to the view Jews, as a fremdes Volk, to be segregated and disallowed intermarriage with Aryans (Bloom 2011, pp. 108, 334, 337).) and in 1933 met for a discussion Hans F. K. Günther, Heinrich Himmler's mentor, and Germany's highest authority on racial theory, a figure later caricatured as Nazism's Rassenpapst (race-pope). (Note: Ruppin esteemed Günther not only for his knowledge of racial theory, but also because he was a supporter of Zionism, writing, in Bloom's paraphrase, that "The 'segment of Jewry that thinks in a Jewish-völkisch way,' he observed, properly recognizes the 'process of mixing' as a 'process of decomposition' that threatens their own people. The 'racial-biological future of Jewry,' he asserted, could take one of two paths, either that of Zionism or that of 'decline (Untergang) [...] only the clear separation of the Jews from the non-Jews, and the non-Jews from the Jews,' he concluded, would provide a 'dignified solution to the Jewish question'." (Bloom 2011, p. 340))

For Ruppin, what Zionism required was to weed out inferior, "semitic" racial elements among Ostjuden and select only those whose biology was best adapted to the soil and climate of Palestine where, by productive agriculture and militarization, they would vindicate their racial affinity with biblical Hebrews. To that end he drew up a hierarchy of Jewish racial types which distinguished Ashkenazi – allegedly not Semitic but an Aryan breed via descent from Hittites and Amorites – from the inferior, presumptively Bedouin-related Sephardim. The positive qualities of the exemplary Urjude (archetypal Jew), once considered Sephardic, were transferred to the Ashkenazi while the negative stereotypes of Jews, mercenary and materialistic, were shifted onto Sephardim and Mizrachi Jews. (Note: "It was not the Jews who were greedy, it was the Semites, who were, in his analysis, a degenerate component, an ominous threat to the Ashkenazi majority's racial regeneration, that did not have any significant affinity to most of the Jews, who were actually non-Semites: "The Ashkenazim are such an overwhelming majority among the Jews today that they are often considered "the Jews" as such".") As early as 1934 he successfully thwarted the implementation of a proposal by Yaakov Faitlovitch to bring Ethiopian Jews to Palestine on the grounds that they were "niggers" converted by the sword in 2600 BCE. (Note: Israel formally recognized them as Jews in 1973. Subsequently, in 1984 and 1991 Operation Moses and Operation Solomon respectively airlifted Ethiopian Jews to Israel, officially permitting mass immigration both for them and their converted African slaves (Salamon 2003, pp. 3–32).)

While there were other experiments in social engineering of the Jews, Bloom argues that only the Palestinian-Zionist initiative succeeded in its project, that of radically recasting modern Jewish identity and the "Jewish body". Ruppin, who used a Prussian model in settlement planning, (Note: German settlements were clustered closely together in colonizing areas with Polish majorities, in such a way as to interrupt territorial continguity between the resultant Polish 'islands' (Bloom 2011, pp. 161–162).) played a major role in implementing the plan in practical terms. Deeply interested in racial hygiene (Rassenhygiene), with Otto Heinrich Warburg, Ruppin controlled most of the financial resources for immigration, and pressed for the selection of only the fittest Ashkenazi Ostjuden as olim for the "human material" of a "gene pool" of a new Jewish, non-Semitic Maccabean type. He did everything possible to dilute what he thought of as the deleterious dominance of the Sephardic/Mizrachi communities, who often depended on diaspora charity for survival, and restore the "germplasm" of the pure race of ancient Jews he considered dormant in the Ashkenazi. The strict eugenic policies meant that towards the end of the Second Aliyah (1912–1914) 80% of aspiring immigrants were rejected. The unfit masses of Eastern European Jewish refugees were deemed people best relocated in the United States.

In the 1930s, German Jews caught in the exacting tensions between the hammer of exclusionist antisemitic race policies under Nazism, and the anvil of total assimilation, increasingly strove to redefine themselves in terms of the new hegemonic discourse of race, appropriating the language of their oppressors in order to subvert its implications of inferiority. (Note: "(the process) denotes the acceptance of terms used in the dominant discourse against a stereotyped group by that group itself, while the group changes their own valuations. In the case of racial discourse, the differences between groups are thus admitted but the negative or allegedly inferior element of the hierarchy created is revalued and renamed, and new goals and challenges are set. " (Avraham 2013, pp. 355–356))

These matters and discussions were not widely disseminated in the Jewish population before the 1930s. (Note: Apart from a handful of references to the topic in the Jewish press, the notion of the racial nature of Judaism did not filter down to the bulk of Jewish society, which in any case was not equipped with the scholarly apparatus to engage with the discussion (Avraham 2017, p. 478).) Not all Zionists using concepts such as "race" at this time agreed on its biological dimension. (Note: "scientific racism lacked conceptual clarity allowed for multiple interpretations: the terms Rasse, Volk, Stamm (tribe), and Nation were fuzzy, implying racial-biological meanings but anthropological, sociological, and cultural ones, too. Moreover, the early Zionists' racial discourse - which in itself was not adopted by all Zionists - did not envision a struggle between Jews and other races; as demonstrated by John Efron, it was free of chauvinistic argumentation. Nevertheless, by turning ideas of blood relations, inbreeding, racial gifts, and historical selection and evolution into categories that differentiated the Jews from other peoples, these Zionists could not entirely evade biological determinism, even if couched in humanistic concepts of transnational alliance." (Avraham 2017, p. 478)) Some Zionists – for example Robert Weltsch and Israel Zangwill – did not embrace the racial idea. (Note: "Zionism, in fact, was proposed as the only viable solution to the threat to Jewish collective survival. And race was seen as a necessary component of this national revival. Not all Zionist thinkers embraced such racialist notions, as the selection in this volume by Robert Weltsch testifies... Nonetheless, racial ideas and images proved quite attractive to many Jewish nationalists, offering them a language with which to define Jewishness as an objective fact, a matter of biology and history as well as subjective will. Moreover, the fact that racial thinking was closely aligned with science, that it drew much of its content—as well as whatever claim it had to mainstream legitimacy—from the natural and social sciences, was also attractive to Zionism, a movement that portrayed itself as scientific." (Hart 2011, p. xxviii-xxix)) Cultural Zionists such as Ahad Ha'am, Martin Buber and Theodor Lessing emphasised the cultural or spiritual decay of the Jewish people rather than its biological or racial decay, echoing wider cultural discourses around decay and degeneration in European culture of the time – but sometimes used biological metaphors. For example, according to Robert Weltsch at the time, an orientation towards race had been foreshadowed in Buber's Three Addresses on Judaism (1911) where Buber spoke of blood determining thought in the deepest layer of power in the soul which dictates every tone and every colour of Jewish existence. (Note: "(a)die Entdeckung, daß die tiefsten Schichten unseres Wesens vom Blute bestimmt daß unser Gedanke und unser Wille zu innerst von ihm gefärbt sind. (b) Und wenn sie dennoch dem Juden eine Wirklichkeit werden kann, so liegt das eben daran, daß die Abstammung nicht bloß Zusammenhang mit dem Vergangenen bedeutet: daß sie etwas in uns gelegt hat, was uns zu keiner Stunde unseres Lebens verläßt, was jeden Ton und jede Farbe in unserem Leben, in dem was wir tun und in dem was uns geschieht, bestimmt: das Blut als die tiefste Machtschicht der Seele." (Buber 1920, pp. 19, 22)) Other Zionists harshly criticised race science, preferring a conception of Jewish religious heritage to one of descent. (Note: this racial reading of Judaism received harsh criticism from other Zionist, Orthodox, and assimilationist Jews. The first of these lamented the rejection of religious heritage in favour of the "dark urgings of the blood" (Avraham 2017, p. 478).) On the other hand, even some non-Zionist Jews began to understand Jews in racial terms in this period. (Note: "Even liberal integrationist opponents of the nascent Zionist movement were not averse to referring to the Jewish people as a race. In a letter to Israel Zangwill (1864–1926) in 1903, Lucien Wolf (1857 1930), for example, admitted there was 'a Jewish race' as well as 'a Jewish religion' while denying there had been "a Jewish nationality since the destruction of the Second Temple (Endelman 2004, p. 53).)

=== 1948–1960s ===
The effect of Nazism and its genocidal policies discredited racial science and "postwar genetics worked hard to distance itself from race science for both scientific and ethical reasons". In a four-point Unesco declaration in 1950, any correlation between national/religious groups and race was denied, and it was affirmed that race itself was "less a biological fact than a social myth". According to the Israeli historian of science, Snait B. Gissis, an emotional barrier caused Israeli geneticists and medical researchers from 1946 to 2003 to take pains to avoid the term "race" in their scientific publications. The use of race still lingered on, nonetheless, in the anthropological literature, (Note: "By 1975-79, only one-quarter of physical anthropology textbooks continued to argue for the validity of the race concept. By 1985, only 50 percent of physical anthropologists accepted the idea that there are biological races in the species Homo sapiens, and 42 percent rejected the idea." (Tekiner 1991, p. 40)) and highly influential geneticists such as Leslie Dunn and Theodosius Dobzhansky, who had been critics of race science, persisted in maintaining that races did exist, and substituted "race" by "populations". (Note: "While the social anthropologists and sociologists that were signatorties to the UNESCO statement were happy enough to stress that race was a 'social myth' more than it was a 'biological phenomenon', biologists and physical anthropologists were generally not in agreement;" (Schaffer 2010, p. 81))

In the decade after 1948 Israel underwent massive immigration with 70% of Israeli Jews having been born elsewhere. The marked heterogeneity of these disparate peoples, according to Raphael Patai, generated at the time serious interethnic friction among Israeli Jews, while at the same time making the very idea of a "Jewish race" seem a myth. (Note: "This 'ingathering of the exiles' brought together in Israel numerous Jewish ethnic groups which so obviously and unmistakably belonged to different 'races' that their very juxtaposition in one small country seemed to relegate the view that the Jews constitute a single human race to the realm of myth. At the same time, the very presence in Israel of numerous disparate Jewish ethnic groups has produced serious cultural clashes bearing many of the hallmarks of 'racial' friction, or at least perceived as such by those directly involved in them" (Patai & Patai 1989, p. 2).) It also shifted, according to Falk, the earlier emphasis on healing the ostensible "degenerative" blemishes, hereditary or environmental, of Jewish bodies and souls which Zionism imputed to life in the diaspora, towards investigating the nature of hereditary diseases found in the incoming communities. The groups in this influx were classified in terms of edot , "communities", or ethnic subgroups and constituted a very heterogeneous society. (Note: "Communities" is considered an "unfortunate" translation. Of these, the edot hamizrach (oriental Jewish communities ) alone consisted of 17 distinct ethnic subgroups.) Often striking differences in inherited diseases within these edot emerged as population genetics began to examine this new aliyah wave's Jewish communities. (Note: Ethiopian Falasha immigrants were excluded from research as they were not regarded as being Jewish (Kirsh 2003, p. 636).) Numerous Israeli biologists were excited by the research opportunities afforded by the new demographic situation in this "special historical moment". One offshoot of this intense focus on the genetics of hereditary disease was to explore also the phylogenetic relations between these edot and determine their origins, a focus influenced by political interests. In reviewing the literature of this period, Nurit Kirsh concluded that, though working within the framework of international science, the approaches adopted by Israeli geneticists at the time were "substantially affected by Zionist ideology", with its notion that Jews were a non-European race whose purity was conserved despite millennia in diaspora. (Note: "This essay describes the effects of Zionist ideology on research into human population genetics carried out in Israel during the 1950s and early 1960s... The comparison reveals that during this period the Israeli human geneticists and physicians emphasized the sociological and historical aspects of their research and used their work, among other things, as a vehicle for establishing a national identity and confirming the Zionist narrative." (Kirsh 2003, p. 631)) (Note: "Israeli geneticists in the 1950s acknowledged, yet downplayed, genetic evidence of historical admixture between Jews and non-Jews." (Burton 2022, p. 414))

A standard approach adopted by Israeli geneticists traditionally was to privilege research on gene frequencies among Mizrachi and Sephardi groups as opposed to Jewish communities of European background. The overall 19th century assumption that Jews were a pure isolate, nonetheless, still remained in force, (Note: The Jews were singled out for such studies because they had both a well documented history and were thought to retain their purity by endogamy (Lipphardt 2008b, pp. 191–191, 193–4).) a premise shared by scientists abroad, who also embraced the idea in the decades from 1950 down to the 1970s that Jews had little admixture, and constituted a genetic isolate, a position Israeli scientists promoted among their colleagues abroad.

=== 1960s–2000 ===
From the 1950s down to the 1970s, when they gained momentum, two trends emerged in human genetics research. On the one hand, studies of racial admixture intensified, while statistical models grew more sophisticated, particularly as computer programming allowed for greater complexity in calculations of genetic distance to establish how close otherwise distinct communities might be. Such distances, visualized in dendrograms, are based on variations in gene (allele) frequency between groups under comparison. (Note: Such allele differences can be accounted for by several factors, such as natural selection, founder effects, inbreeding or admixture when contiguous populations interbred (Burton 2022, pp. 412–413).) Israeli geneticists, who had been accustomed to consider diasporic admixture an irrelevancy as they strove to reconstruct an ancient Jewish gene pool, worked closely with the prominent Stanford school headed by Luca Luigi Cavalli-Sforza, Walter Bodmer and Samuel Karlin. From the early 1970s, research on HLA gene frequencies among Israel's ethnic subgroups targeted Mizrachi/Sephardim communities, but also examined blood from non-Jewish Israeli citizens, such as Armenians, Druze and Palestinians.

In the mid-70s, a growing sense of crisis compounded anxieties among Israel's dominant class as the Mizrachi began to challenge the cultural, social and political ascendency of the Ashkenazi elite, a challenge which was to culminate in the victory of Menachem Begin's Likud party in the 1977 Israeli legislative election. This internal worry was aggravated by the near simultaneous publication of books by two Hungarian Zionists, Raphael and Jennifer Patai's Myth of the Jewish Race (1975) and Arthur Koestler's The Thirteenth Tribe (1976). Both bestsellers showcased arguments for the importance of admixture in the formation of the Jewish people. While Patai provided extensive historical details of conversion and Jewish endogamy, his daughter Jennifer Wing, using a computerized equation by Cavalli-Sforza, concluded that the genetic distance between East European Jews and non-Jews was lower than that between Ashkenazim and Sephardim/Mizrachis. (Note: "According to their interpretation of these genetic distance values..the Jews could not constitute a race -indeed, nor could virtually any population group..Wing's discussion of the genetic distance values pointed out that the distance between Ashkenazim and Eastern European and English non-Jews was lower than that between Ashkenazim and any category of Sephardim or Mizrachim." (Burton 2022, p. 421)) Though one purpose of these works was to cut the ground from under the feet of antisemites by revealing the fallacies of a "Jewish race" which underwrote modern hatred of Jews, the two publications increased anxieties among Ashkenazis both abroad and in Israel, who were privately disturbed by Likud's landslide ascendancy. Coinciding with these events, Elise Burton argues, geneticists began to scale down their Mizrachi fieldwork's importance and focus increasingly on analyses of data sets in an attempt to rebut the Patai/Koestler thesis of admixtures of Jews and non-Jews (Note: "(The two books) transformed Israeli population genetics from a largely descriptive enterprise to a vigorous refutation of the two books" assertions about historical levels of admixture between Jews and non-Jews' (Burton 2022, p. 423).) and locate the Ashkenazi within an Eastern Mediterranean setting. (Note: "Even in Israel, the centre of Jewish diversity in colour and cultural norms, whiteness registers as the dominant Israeli self-image, while dark-skinned Jews appear as novel, rather than as a defining norm of Jewish multiculturalism... One relevant report... not(es) that one reason Ashkenazi Jews are so prominent in gene research is that "a disproportionate number of Jewish doctors has resulted in an intensive study of their own communities and conditions (Azoulay 2003, p. 121).)

In responses that challenged Patai's claims, two analytical teams, one led by Dorit Carmelli and Cavalli-Sforza, the other headed by Bonné-Tamir, Bodmer and Karlin, developed two different statistical models to evaluate the genetics of common Jewish origins, dispersion, drift and admixture. While they shared similar assumptions about the defect of Patai's analysis of admixture, their own distinct methods generated different quantitative results and interpretations, laying the seeds for a future controversy about admixture. At a presentation in 1977, the Israeli team outlined their work showing no significant admixture from Europeans in "Mediterranean" Ashkenazis. Cavalli-Sforza's calculations by contrast suggested little admixture in Mizrachi Maghrebi, Iraqi and Iranian Jews as opposed to almost 54% of admixture in the Ashkenazi. However, if data from HLA gene frequencies was added, Ashkenazi appeared to have no admixture. It followed for Cavallo-Sforza that any attempt to determine admixture from non-Jews in Ashkenazis was premature. In 1978 Karlin then developed a new statistical model for genetic distance calculations, which, applied to the data, suggested Ashkenazim were closer to Jewish and other Middle Eastern populations than they were to Europeans. Genetic inflow from non-Jews was deemed minuscule, and until 1984 this became the consensus view of Israeli geneticists, (Note: The work of two TAU-based Russian Ashklenazi physical anthropologists in Israel, Sergiu Micle and Eugene D. Kobyliansky, did buttress this conclusion in a number of studies at the time employing four different models for estimating genetic distances (Burton 2022, pp. 435–436).) who considered the problem solved, and rarely mentioned the differing results obtained by the Cavalli-Sforzi-Carmelli approach, though in 1980 Newton Morton, detecting serious flaws in Karlin's statistical analysis, had strongly criticized the objectivity of the Israeli consensus verdict. Thereafter, however, Israeli biologists returned to the study of Mizrachi groups, several of whom were acknowledged to have higher admixture.

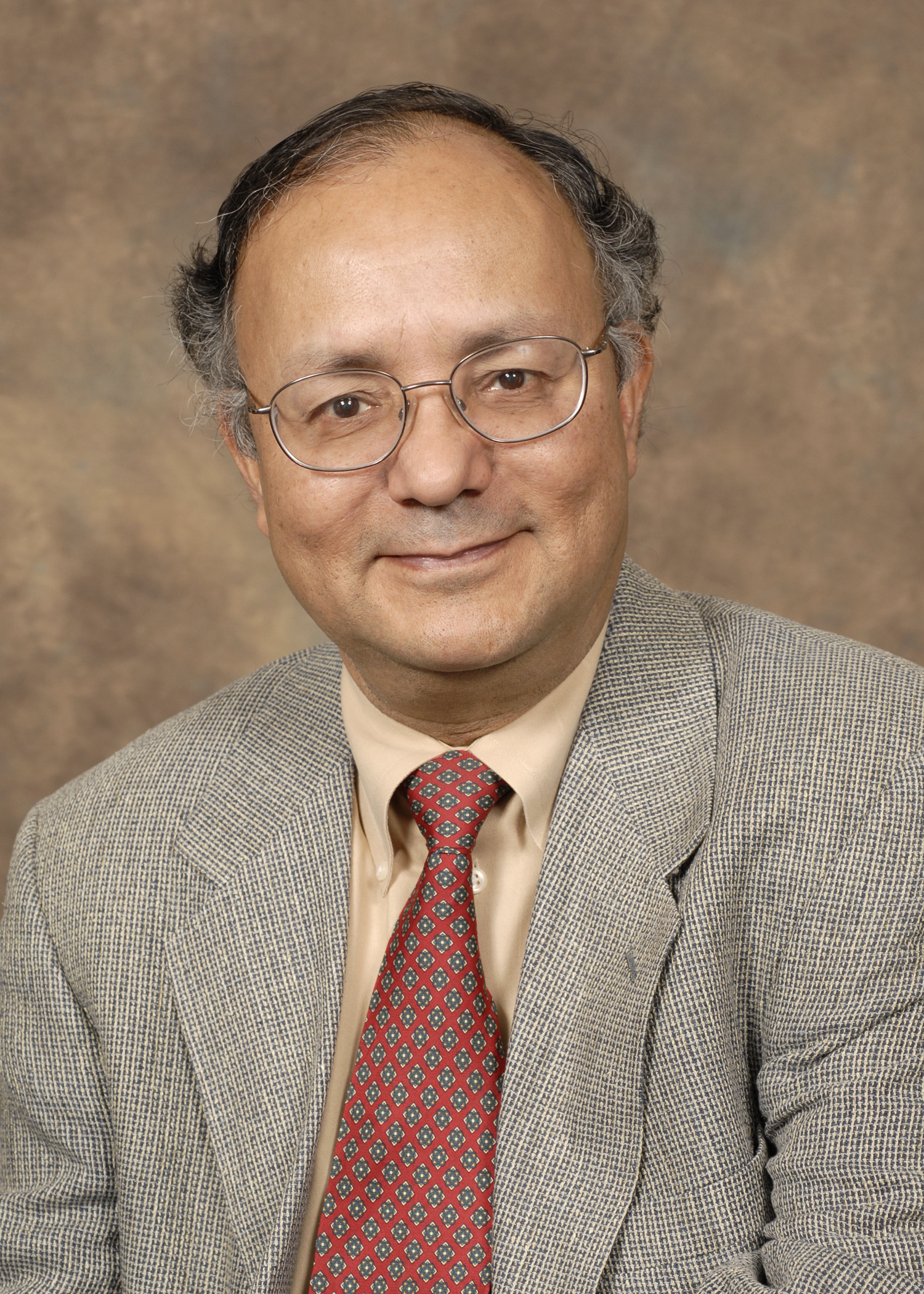
Ranajit Chakraborty, who published a review of the statistical methods used in Ashkenazi genetic studies

Morton's distinctive modeling backed the Patais' admixture theory by yielding an average 1% of gentile admixture per generation, and therefore lent support to Cavalli-Sforza's earlier conclusion. Cavalli-Sforza commented that, depending on the genetic markers selected, vast discrepancies in admixture estimates could be generated, and therefore no adequate statistical model was yet available to determine the ratios of admixture. In Burton's interpretation, both approaches were guilty of circular reasoning, with a "known" version of Jewish history influencing the design of the very statistical formulae ostensibly crafted to ascertain it. (Note: "This embedded circular reasoning meant that the real controversy was over the different versions of 'known history' accepted and perpetuated by, on one side, Koestler, Patai, Wing, Neel, and Morton; on another, Bonné-Tamir, Karlin, Motulsky, and most Israeli geneticists; and finally, the ambivalent positions taken by the Bodmers, Cavalli-Sforza, Carmelli, and (Ron S.) Kenett." (Burton 2022, p. 434)) in 1986 Ranajit Chakraborty, in a lengthy paper on the statistical methods used to determine degrees of genetic admixture in human groups, cited the genetic literature on the Ashkenazi as one of the three cases in population genetics where researchers produced discordant conclusions, the other two being African Americans and Icelanders. In 1991, Roselle Tekiner, commenting on Zionism's aim to forge an inclusive Jewish identity from the "ingathering of the exiles", argued that attempts to create a single identity out of disparate Jewish populations had failed. One 1974 study showed that a significant minority of Israelis lacked a sense of identity with the wider world of diaspora Jews. (Note: "24 percent of nonreligious, 13 percent of traditional, and 4 percent of religious Israelis [did] not identify with "the Jewish people"." (Tekiner 1991, p. 44)) The growing secular constituency required more than the consensual view, grounded in a theological right to the land, to connect into a generic Jewish identity. Tekiner suggested that Zionist tacticians and others, nonplussed by this failure, might look for scientific proof to convince secularists in particular that they formed a part of a biologically integral "race" descended from the biblical Hebrews.

In Elise Burton's summation, the infra-academic conflict above, which led to divergent results between the two schools, reflected different foci of interest for the respective research teams. The Israeli school specialized in Jewish and Middle Eastern populations, whereas the primary aim of the group around Cavalli-Sforza directed its project towards a much broader, global problem, that of the genetic history of all migrating human communities. The latter considered that the intricate history of Jewish populations across the diaspora was far too complicated for the purpose of testing admixtures.

=== The genome era: 2000 to the present ===
By the early 2000s, studies on the Zionist racial narrative gave way to modern genetic research, which was often met with controversy. (Note: "In contrast to the rest of the region, the history of genetic research on Jews in Israel has been relatively well studied. Historians and anthropologists have critically examined how the structuring assumptions of Jewish race science in early-twentieth-century Europe and North America, and their relationship to Zionist nationalism, reverberate within the genetic studies of Jewish populations by Israeli scientists from the 1950s to the present." (Burton 2021, p. 11)) Critics saw this new research as recycling earlier discredited metaphors of blood and race, repackaged as the biological variation between ethnic populations.

DNA sequencing from the 70s onwards had been slow even as it became a widespread analytical tool for positions in the debate on Ashkenazi origins. With the rise of automatic whole genome sequencing in the 1990s, research took rapid strides but controversy has remained an ongoing problem. Susan Martha Kahn in a 2005 overview of work on Jewish genetics observed that "racial assumptions about Jewish genetic uniqueness" were still a contemporary issue. At the end of the decade (2011) Mitchell Hart stated that "race" still remained a notable feature of both scholarly and popular Jewish thought informing the construction of modern Jewish concepts of identity. (Note: "race" is a significant component not only of scholarly or academic modern Jewish thought, but also of popular or everyday Jewish thought. It is one of the building blocks of contemporary Jewish identity construction, even if there are many who would dispute the applicability of biological or racial categories to Jews (Hart 2011, p. xxxv).)

In 2012, two important books appeared providing different overviews of results and approaching the subject from seemingly antithetical positions, while drawing on the same data sets: Harry Ostrer's A Genetic History of the Jewish People, and Nadia Abu El-Haj's The Genealogical Science: The Search for Jewish Origins and the Politics of Epistemology. (Note: "Following this initiation in mid-century Israel, research on Jewish populations has been continuous. But technologies and attitudes have changed and Abu El-Haj's book is mainly concerned with the most recent developments. Since the mid-nineties, geneticists based in Israel, Britain and the U.S. have applied advances in Y chromosome and mtDNA analysis to questions of Jewish biological difference. Apparently studying themselves, these researchers—who either self-designate as Jewish or work in teams with others who do—have largely evaded the accusations of colonial and racist prejudices that otherwise have haunted human population genetics. But even as the researchers are not anti-Semites and although their technologies and analyses are more refined than were ever those of race science, there exists a particular continuity in research objectives and questions posed: Who are the Jews? Are they a people? Where do they come from? This last question—originally whether the Jews were racially Semitic and thus foreign to Europe—has spawned another with direct political implications in the present: Is the Israeli state right to speak of Jewish settlement in Israel and on the Occupied Territories in terms of a return?" Hellström 2013, p. 439) Ostrer outlined a trajectory arching over a century of studies on Jews, from Maurice Fishberg's The Jews: A Study of Race and Environment (1911) onwards. (Note: Fishberg adopted the data of numerous studies in physical anthropology and subscribed to the notion of a Jewish race, but believed it was highly malleable and susceptible to change under different environmental challenges (Fishberg 1911, pp. v–viii, 504–556).) The scope of research showed a direct continuity, the difference lying in the great technical strides made since the early 20th century when the seeds were laid for modern genetics by the theory, which Fishberg's New York contemporary Thomas Hunt Morgan was developing, that chromosomal factors played a role in inheritance. Heirs to this tradition, Ostrer believed his generation was now in a position to apply sophisticated scientific methods to obtain a genetic answer to the crux of Jewish origins and identity. The result is, for Ostrer, that, "Jewishness can be characterized at the genetic level as a tapestry, in which the threads are represented as shared segments of DNA". (Note: Weitzman makes a careful distinction in construing Ostrer's metaphor: "the Jews can be described at the genetic level as a tapestry, with no single genetic thread running through the whole tapestry, (editor's italics) but with different Jewish populations woven together by various threads." (Weitzman 2019, p. 300)) Ostrer's research in contemporary molecular genetics advances a solution aligning traditional Jewish narratives with a biologically recognizable marker for Jewishness. (Note: "Are recent discoveries fragmentary and half-truths? I think not, because the molecular genetic studies of which Sand is critical have set the bar higher for discovery, reporting, and acceptance than the race science of a century ago—less stand-alone observation with more replication and more rigorous statistical testing. The stakes in genetic analysis are high. It is more than an issue of who belongs in the family and can partake in Jewish life and Israeli citizenship. It touches on the heart of Zionist claims for a Jewish homeland in Israel. One can imagine future disputes about exactly how large the shared Middle Eastern ancestry of Jewish groups has to be to justify Zionist claims." (Ostrer 2012, p. 220))

El-Haj, an anthropologist working within the field of social science examining genomic research, (Note: "Human population genetics... has been called 'the most widely misused area of human genetics' largely because findings are readily appropriated into preexisting cultural narratives... where they may be presented as 'proof' in support of a variety of sociopolitical agendas. In addition, determination of what constitutes a 'population' and what constitute 'discrete and comparable populations', critical decisions for the purposes of designing or interpreting genetic studies, can also be deeply entwined with popular concepts of race and other essentialist notions of identity. Given these issues and the veritable explosion in genomic research and its applications in recent decades, some scholars have expressed concerns that we have entered an era of the 'molecularization of race'.." (Baker 2017, p. 105)) challenged Ostrer's conclusions. She considers the whole enterprise of using genetics to confirm a narrative of origins problematic. She cites the Israeli geneticist Raphael Falk for the view that while Y-chromosome markers are "signatures" indexing ancient origins, they do not constitute evidence of the biological unity of Jews. (Note: "According to Falk 'Junk DNA is natural-cultural artifact that carries a genealogical message bearing witness to one's geographic origins and cultural past. It functions as evidence of what one might call cultural fidelity — of the fact that contemporary, self-designated Jews really do descend from a single ancient population, from a common history and long tradition of cultural distinction that is visible on the Y-chromosome only because their (male) ancestors remained true to their faith. Y-chromosome markers are 'signatures' of ancient origins (Thomas 1998, 139). Such markers are not, by way of contrast, evidence of the 'biological unity' of the Jews, a concept central to racial theories of Jewishness that dominated late nineteenth- and early twentieth-century thought." (Abu El-Haj 2012, pp. 48–49)) Her reading constituency, Kahn argues, also includes those anti-Zionists who would call into question a "foundational assumption on which the Zionist enterprise is predicated", and feed into the "discursive do-si-do of opposing narratives that characterize the ongoing Israel/Palestine conflict".

According to El-Haj and Burton, Jewish geneticists had to reconcile professional commitment to objectivity with their own personal investment in the topic. (Note: David B. Goldstein writes:"I suspect that had I no Jewish heritage, this work would likely have never led me into Jewish genetic history." (Goldstein 2009, p. xii)) Tensions over objectivity resurfaced among Jewish scholars, and in Israel the Ashkenazi background of most scientists conducting gene research led to claims that they were predominantly focused on their own communities. Because these Jewish genetic researchers constructed historical narratives along with pure science, entanglement could provoke heated political impacts. (Note: When the findings of a 2019 DNA study of Philistine bones linked them to Mediterranean peoples, Benjamin Netanyahu's Twitter account boasted it was proof that the Palestinians, unlike Jews, had no historic roots in Israel/Palestine (Gannon 2019; Kohler 2022, p. 1).)

In overviews of the subject, both the geneticist Raphael Falk and the historian Steven Weitzman have written of the dangers of confirmation bias. Falk writes:

the history of the relationship of Zionism and scientific biology, which has made an effort to single out Jews from non-Jews on the one hand, and to unite the distinct Jewish communities on the other hand, provides a problematic case of the utilisation of biological arguments as "evidence" for whatever social, economic, or political notion that has been put forward.

Weitzman recognizes the problem, but argues that notwithstanding the suspicious impression given by many genetic studies that science is being used to endorse a traditional belief, in the Jewish case, there appears to be evidence that would point towards precisely such an overlap between belief and scientific research:

For some scholars, it is suspicious that genetic analysis would seem to be reaffirming what many Jews already believe about their origin. Sometimes, what the evidence reveals is that the actual biogenetic ancestry of people can be very different from what people think their ancestry is ... Is it possible that there is bias at work in the genetic study of the Jews, that researchers are predisposed to accept results that confirm what Jews believe about themselves, and to discount results at odds with that self-image? Possibly, but there have also been studies that suggest that in some contexts self-identity and genetically established ancestry can match up fairly well. That is what much of recent genetic research has been suggesting about the Jews: that there is a correspondence between what they believe about the origin of their ancestors and the genetic ancestry registered in their DNA, that they have an ancestry distinct from that of the non-Jews among whom they live, and that some of those ancestors came from the Near East.

There are considerably large amounts of common ancestry, but there is no single Jewish genotype; there is no single Jewish identity that can be established genetically in all cases. Continuities of vertical descent are observed, but gene flow both between Jewish communities, as well as with surrounding gentile communities was also intense. (Note: "It becomes overwhelmingly clear that although Jews maintained detectable vertical genetic continuity along generations of socio-religious-cultural relationship, also intensive horizontal genetic relations were maintained both between Jewish communities and with the gentile surrounding. Thus, in spite of considerable consanguinity, there is no Jewish genotype to identify." (Falk 2014, p. 5)) Kohler, commenting on three studies by Behar (2010), Atzmon (2010) and Ostrer (2012), concludes that they are not unique as "since from the 1950s onwards studies show that Jews from different geographic/ethnic backgrounds were somewhat related". Falk stated that, "(t)here are no 'Jewish genes,' even though there are plenty of mutations that are pretty much restricted to a certain group of Jews", a viewpoint endorsed by Robert Pollack, (Note: "From any one person to another unrelated person, about one letter in a thousand, more or less, will be different when their three billion-letter DNAs are compared. There is no biological data in support of the notion of being a Jew solely through the inheritance of a single specific DNA sequence, nor will there ever be such evidence. There is no chance of some human genomes being Jewish and others not; biology makes all people truly equal." (Pollack 2013, p. 1)) among others.

The questions posed by thinkers on race over a century ago have relevance to contemporary scholarly discussions and debates on the genetic origins of ethnic groups. Some earlier controversies persist, with similar juxtaposition of antithetical views, between scientific proponents and skeptics of Jewish genetic or racial distinctions. Schaffer illustrates the point by underscoring how the marked differences in the views of two English Jewish physician-scholars and colleagues, Charles Singer and Redcliffe Salaman, – the former indifferent to Zionism and the latter an ardent supporter of the movement – form two categories in an "intellectual schism" dividing Jewish thinkers on race, a schism that remains alive even after the lapse of a century. Schaffer concludes his overview of a half-century of strenuous studies, by declaring that an ideological intransigence in all parties to the dispute persists, and that "discussions of this nature are unlikely to come to synthesis any time soon and instead are destined to remain bogged down in religious dogma and political agendas".

According to Anita Shapira, summarizing the genetic studies of Behar and Ostrer, "results confirm the common wisdom that Jews have always held," of a common Middle Eastern origin and heritage. Geneticist Sarah Tishkoff said that Ostrer's work along with Behar's study "clearly show a genetic common ancestry" to the majority of Jewish populations.

A 2020 summary article written by Ostrer summarizes his own research and that of Behar, Xue, and others, with analysis of critical studies, as follows: "Population genetic studies support dual Middle Eastern and Southern European origins for Ashkenazi Jews, their distinct founding event and their relatedness to other Jewish groups (Ostrer and Skorekci, 2013). Some issues of Ashkenazi Jewish population genetics remain. ... The contemporary view of Ashkenazi Jewish origins appears to be quite durable based on many analyses of large numbers of individuals by independent investigational groups. "

=== Race and non-Jews ===
According to Falk, "Even though not a race in a biological sense, political Zionism, after a century of attempts to prove contemporary Jews' material, biological relationships – not merely their spiritual, cultural ones – to the ancient people of the biblical stories, in spite of widespread interspersing with local communities, finally has succeeded. It is tragic that Zionism, as well as Arab Nationalism, have failed to recognize the Palestinians, many of whom similarly appear to share phylogenetic relations to the historic inhabitants of the country, as equal partners."

Since the 1990s, Israeli sociologist Uri Ram has identified the emergence of an "exclusionary, nationalist, even racist, and antidemocratic political-cultural trend, striving to heighten the fence encasing Israeli identity".

== Impact ==
Research into the medical genetics of Jews has identified factors associated with certain diseases known to affect Jews, though the share of genetic diseases among them is no greater than among any other population. Some 20 single gene mutations alone have been detected that affect the Ashkenazi, among them illnesses such as Tay–Sachs disease, Canavan disease, Gaucher's disease, Riley-Day syndrome, Niemann–Pick disease and Huntington's chorea and many other often fatal conditions, some associated particularly with, but not exclusively to, Jews. Institutions such as Dor Yeshorim have created a DNA database so that one can check for genetically incompatible matches among prospective couples.

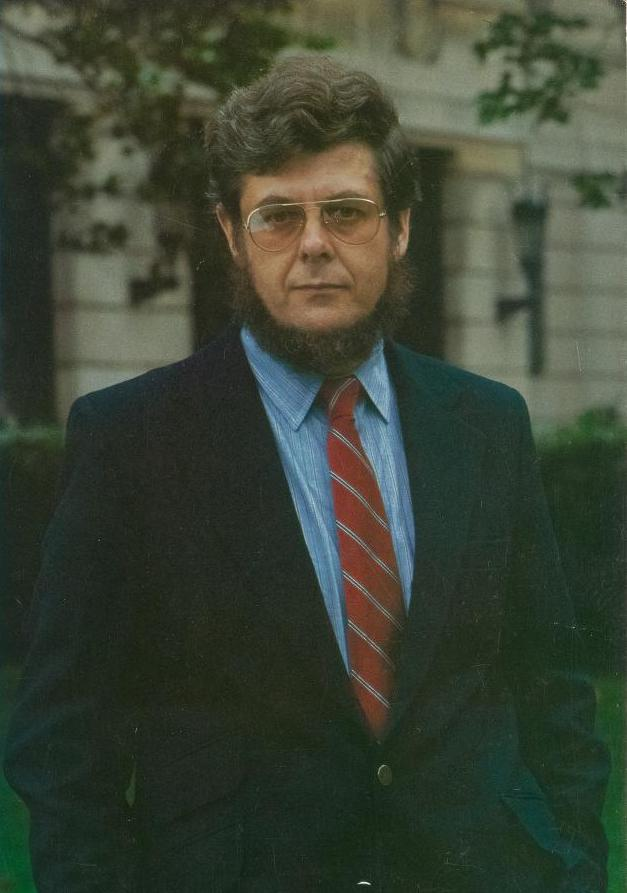
Robert Pollack, who noted the halakhic indifference to biological Jewishness versus religious practice

According to Michael Satlow, Professor of Religious Studies and Judaic Studies at Brown University, whatever implications might be read into these researches, Jewish religious law and the Law of Return have not been affected by Jewish population genetics. Genetic research has raised issues that affect the definition of who a Jew is, and contemporary rabbinical discussions do address problems that arise from the impact of genetics and new reproductive technologies. While Rebecca Alpert cites the Tanakh for the idea that there is a theological basis for biology as part of being Jewish, (Note: "There is no question that the biblical author understood a critical link between biological and cultural sources of Jewish identity." (Alpert 2007, p. 74)) the geneticist Robert Pollack has drawn on the authority of Maimonides to arrive at the opposite conclusion. In the Mishneh Torah, according to Pollack, the Rambam states that "when hiring a teacher of Torah for yourself or your child, you should give a learned mamzer, (a child from an illicit union), precedence over an ignorant man, even if that ignorant man happens to be the Kohen Gadol himself." The standard halakhic definition draws a distinction between a biological transmission of Jewishness (via the mother), and Jewishness as a matter of religious practice, extending to converts, and limiting the role of genes in Jewishness. Genetic evidence has been adduced to campaign for the right to aliyah for people like the Bantu Lemba, after indications turned up that their Buba priesthood were found to be bearers of the Y-chromosomal Aaron associated with the Cohanim who are, in Jewish tradition, thought to be direct descendants of the priestly caste that made sacrifices at the Second Temple.

The genetics of Jewish identity have given rise to concerns among historians specializing in Jewish studies who question the selective use of versions of traditional history in interpreting genetic data, and consider cross-disciplinary collaboration proposals confusing. (Note: (in American Journal of Human Genetics 2003) "the geneticists enter a debate, historical in nature, in order to contribute to it by genetic research-only to demand a new historical explanation for the unexpected genetic outcome of their study." (Kohler 2014, p. 111)) The reliance of geneticists in framing their research in the area of Jewish genetics on traditional, indeed theological, stories about the Jewish past – a characteristic also of earlier race theories (Note: "The common notion of the Jews as a pure and unalterable race turned into a presupposition for empirical research" (Lipphardt 2012, p. 577).) – is often construed as meaning that old religious narratives underpin the presuppositions informing the science itself. (Note: "the use of Jewish history to help lay out the scientific propositions being tested still obtains".; "Ultimately, all of this research hinges on the ability of scientists to cast generations backwards into a useable historical past. In frequently presupposes..that Jewish history occupied certain spaces and times, and extrapolates scientific possibilities around these narratives.") Some genetic works have claimed to have solved vexed conundrums in Jewish history like the origins of the Levites and Cohanim, while using core assumptions of Jewish tradition in their interpretations of the statistical data (Note: It has been customarily assumed that Levites, who form roughly 4% of the Ashkenazi population, descend via the male line from the biblical Tribe of Levi. A paper by Behar et al., concluded that since the R1a1 modal haplogroup, is strongly attested in both Ashkenazi and a number of Slavic groups, but of low frequency among Sephardim Levites and very rare in other Jewish groups, the former Levites must have had between 1 and 50 non-Jewish European founders. The authors favoured a single founder by citing a religious principle in Judaism. Levite status depends on patrilineal descent and a rabbinical ban would have had to have been breached many times to account for a higher number (American Journal of Human Genetics 2003, pp. 769, 772–774, 776; Kohler 2014, pp. 108–110).) With such a trend, Schaffer argues, genetics is usurping Jewish history, a discipline which is properly the province of historians.

Genetic arguments linking modern Jews and those of ancient Israel lend themselves to Zionist national narratives, and have been described by Ostrer as the "biologization and consolidation" of Jewish national identity. (Note: "Genetic genealogy has added new twists to the controversies around the biologization and consolidation, and returns of identities. Although genetic scientists such as Harry Ostrer, who has asserted that Jews constitute a genetically coherent group, distance themselves from eugenics and spurious 'race science', the nationalist conclusions are presented as uncontroversial: Jews are a people because there is some genetic evidence that many have ancient origins in the Levant (Ostrer 2012). Susan Martha Kahn, an anthropologist specializing in aspects of medical practice in Israel, in commenting on Ostrer's views, remarks that in his work genetic evidence is made to coincide with the Jewish oral tradition of common origins in the Middle East (Kahn 2013), with the consequence of biologization of group identity. It is not an accident that the greater visibility of converso descendants in the Jewish and the wider world coincides with the rise of genetic studies that seek to prove that Jews are a people indigenous to the Middle East, with the obvious geopolitical conclusions legitimizing the claims to Israel/Palestine (Abu El Haj 2012; Kahn 2013); (Kandiyoti 2020);"there can be no clinching biological answer to the question of identifying the original Jews, nor to any question about the shared heritage of all Jews qua Jews... Smocha argues for the emancipation of the Jewish nation from inherited notions of alleged biological unity. Shouldn't genetic research likewise shake itself loose of the effort to anchor Zionism in the supposedly shared biological origins of the Jews?" (Falk 2017, pp. 208–210); "Testament to the legacy of racial thought in giving form to a Zionist vision of Jewish peoplehood by the mid-twentieth century, Israeli population researchers never doubted that biological facts of a shared origin did indeed exist, even as finding those facts remained forever elusive... Looking at the history of Zionism through the lens of work in the biological sciences brings into focus a story long sidelined in histories of the Jewish state: Jewish thinkers and Zionist activists invested in race science as they forged an understanding of the Jewish people and fought to found the Jewish state. By the mid-twentieth century, a biological self-definition — even if not seamlessly a racial one, at least not as race was imagined at the turn of the twentieth century — had become common-sensical for many Jewish nationalists, and, in significant ways, it framed membership and shaped the contours of national belonging in the Jewish state. (Abu El-Haj 2012, p. 18)) Burton suggests that positioning modern Jews as the primary descendants of ancient Israelites underpins the legitimacy of the Zionist narrative, much as the controversial Phoenicianism did around the same time within Lebanese nationalism. (Note: "In the Levantine mandates, anthropometric reconstructions of 'ancient races' like the Phoenicians and Israelites fed into political discourses about Lebanese identity and the legitimacy of Zionism." (Burton 2021, p. 24)) The genetic affinity of Jews to Palestinians can be used to bolster claims that Jews originated in Israel. Anti-Zionists likewise have used genetics to support their critiques of Israel. (Note: "Nor is there any value in complaining, as Millière does, that the Palestinians are an artificial people 'invented' as a 'weapon of war against Israelis and even Jews.' Anti-Zionists play the same game by claiming that the Jewish people were invented and that few modern Jews have a genetic link to ancient Israel. The only question that arises from this argument is: so what? All nations and peoples are invented to varying degrees and at different points in history, and sometimes they disappear too; but just as Shlomo Sand cannot persuade millions of Jews that they are not really Jews, so Millière will fail to persuade millions of Palestinians that they are not really Palestinians. Trying to argue a self-conscious nation out of existence is at best futile, at worst sinister.." (Rich 2017, p. 103)) Jarrod Tanny sums up the issue by remarking: "If nationalism is based on the premise of 'We were here first' and 'we Jews' were not here first, then the land is not 'ours,' and Zionism is little more than an instance of European colonialism." Falk noted that while Zionism has achieved its goal, it was in his view tragic that the very phenotypical evidence from genetics used to underpin its claims to the land suggests that many Palestinians also are related to Jews as equal partners.

A recent study by a team of international psychologists concluded that research into genetic differences could inflame political violence in the Israeli–Palestinian conflict, (Note: For example, a team of American, European, and Israeli psychologists turned to the Israeli-Palestinian conflict to investigate how genetic discourses might contribute to the resolution or exacerbation of ethnic-nationalist tensions. Following a series of studies conducted mainly on Jewish subjects, the psychologists found that Jewish Israelis who read a simulated news article emphasizing the genetic differences between Jews and Arabs "showed less support for political compromise and [...] more support for collective punishment toward Palestinians and more support for the political exclusion of Palestinian citizens of Israel." The psychologists concluded that the rising publicity of research that conflates ethnicity with genetic difference could foreshadow or inflame political violence. Furthermore, this study reaffirmed the co-constitutive roles of Zionist politics and genetic science in the construction of a Jewish biological category and the chronic otherization of Palestinians (Burton 2021, p. 246).) while highlighting genetic similarities could help reduce conflict. (Note: "Using Arabs and Jews from diverse samples and contexts, we demonstrated that those who learn that their ethnic group is genetically related to an enemy group showed more constructive intergroup attitudes, interindividual behaviors, and support for peaceful policies than those who learn about the genetic differences. Specifically, in our three studies conducted in the United States, we found that heightening perceptions of interethnic genetic similarities versus differences altered Jews' and Arabs' negative attitudes, and even the real physical aggression of Jews toward an alleged Arab individual. In fact, it led to more support for conciliatory policies among Jews—in this case related to the Israeli–Palestinian conflict—and, compared with a plain control condition, provided some evidence that emphasizing genetic similarities may be one way to help attenuate intergroup conflict." (Kimel et al. 2016, pp. 688–700)) As McGonigle outlines, arguments over Ashkenazi descent fuel fierce controversies in the politics of Jewish genetics; critics of Israel may contest Zionism as a settler colonial project along genetic grounds. (Note: ""The stakes in the debate over Jewish origins are high, however, since the founding narrative of the Israeli state is based on exilic "return." If European Jews have descended from converts, the Zionist project falls prey to the pejorative categorization as "settler colonialism" pursued under false assumptions, playing into the hands of Israel's critics and fueling the indignation of the displaced and stateless Palestinian people (McGonigle 2021, p. 36).)

== See also ==
- Jewish peoplehood
- Who is a Jew?
- Ethnic nationalism (Racial nationalism)
- Genetic studies on Jews
- Race and genetics
- Racism in Israel
- Racism in Jewish communities
- Politics of archaeology in Israel and Palestine

== Sources ==
- Abu El-Haj, Nadia (2012). The Genealogical Science: The Search for Jewish Origins and the Politics of Epistemology. Chicago Studies in Practices of Meaning. University of Chicago Press. ISBN 978-0-226-20142-9. Archived from the original on 8 July 2023.
- Alpert, Rebecca (Spring 2007). "What Is a Jew? The Meaning of Genetic Disease for Jewish Identity" (PDF). The Reconstructionist. 71 (2): 69–83.
- Aschheim, Steven E. (1982). Brothers and Strangers: The East European Jew in German and German Jewish Consciousness, 1800–1923. University of Wisconsin Press. ISBN 978-0-608-09841-8.
- Avraham, Doron (2013). "The "Racialization" of Jewish Self-Identity: The Response to Exclusion in Nazi Germany, 1933–1938". Nationalism and Ethnic Politics. 19 (3): 354–374. doi:10.1080/13537113.2013.818364. S2CID 147576059.
- Avraham, Doron (2017). "Reconstructing a Collective: Zionism and Race Between National Socialism and Jewish Renewel". The Historical Journal. 60 (2). Cambridge University Press: 471–492. doi:10.1017/S0018246X16000406. JSTOR 26343366. S2CID 164670161.
- Azoulay, Katya Gibel (2003). "Not an Innocent Pursuit: The Politics of a 'Jewish' Genetic Signature". Developing World Bioethics. 3 (2). Wiley: 119–126. doi:10.1046/j.1471-8731.2003.00067.x. ISSN 1471-8731. PMID 14768643.
- Baker, Cynthia M. (2017). "Zionism's New Jew and the Birth of the Genomic Jew". Jew. Key Words in Jewish Studies. Rutgers University Press. pp. 97–110. ISBN 978-0-813-57386-1. Archived from the original on 10 July 2023.
- Balter, Michael (11 June 2010). "Who Are the Jews? Genetic Studies Spark Identity Debate". Science. 328 (5984): 1342. Bibcode:2010Sci...328.1342B. doi:10.1126/science.328.5984.1342. PMID 20538924.
- Behar D, Thomas M, Skorecki K, Hammer MF, et al. (2003). "Multiple Origins of Ashkenazi Levites: Y Chromosome Evidence for Both Near Eastern and European Ancestries". American Journal of Human Genetics. 73 (4): 768–779. doi:10.1086/378506. PMC 1180600. PMID 13680527.
- Blady, Ken (2000). Jewish Communities in Exotic Places. Rowman & Littlefield. ISBN 978-0-765-76112-5.
- Bloom, Etan (2011). Arthur Ruppin and the Production of Pre-Israeli Culture. Studies in Jewish History and Culture. Vol. 31. Brill. ISBN 978-90-04-20379-2. Archived from the original on 21 July 2023.
- Buber, Martin (1920) [First published 1911]. Drei Reden über das Judentum [Three Speeches on Judaism] (in German). Rütten & Loening.
- Burton, Elise K. (2021). Genetic Crossroads: The Middle East and the Science of Human Heredity. Stanford University Press. ISBN 978-1-503-61457-4. Archived from the original on 8 July 2023.
- Burton, Elise K. (2022). "Ashkenazi Anxieties: A Transnational Social History of Jewish Genetic Admixture Modeling, 1971–1986". Journal of the History of Biology. 55 (3): 411–442. doi:10.1007/s10739-022-09693-6. PMID 36322260. S2CID 253257113.
- Doron, Joachim (1980). "Rassenbewusstsein und naturwissenschaftliches Denken im deutschen Zionismus während der wilhelminischen Ära" [Racial Consciousness and Scientific Thinking in German Zionism during the Wilhelminian Era]. Jahrbuch des Instituts für deutsche Geschichte (in German). 9: 389–427.
- Doron, Joachim (1983). "Classic zionism and modern anti-semitism: Parallels and influences (1883-1914)". Studies in Zionism. 4 (2): 169–204. doi:10.1080/13531048208575816.
- Efron, John M. (1994). "Zionism and Racial Anthropology". Defenders of the Race: Jewish Doctors and Race Science in Fin-de-siècle Europe. Yale University Press. pp. 123–174. ISBN 978-0-300-05440-8. Archived from the original on 21 July 2023.
- Efron, John M. (December 2013). "Commentary: Jewish Genetic Origins in the Context of Past Historical and Anthropological Inquiries". Human Biology. 85 (6): 901–918. doi:10.3378/027.085.0602. PMID 25079124.
- Egorova, Yulia (2015). ""Jewish genetics": DNA, culture, and historical narrative". In Valman, Nadia; Roth, Laurence (eds.). The Routledge handbook of contemporary Jewish cultures. Routledge. pp. 353–364. ISBN 978-0-203-49747-0. Archived from the original on 6 June 2023.
- Endelman, Todd M. (Autumn 2004). "Anglo-Jewish Scientists and the Science of Race". Jewish Social Studies. 11 (1): 52–92. doi:10.2979/JSS.2004.11.1.52. JSTOR 4467695. S2CID 162317546.
- Falk, Raphael (2007). "Three Zionist Men of Science: Between Nature and Nurture". In Charpa, Ulrich; Deichmann, Ute (eds.). Jews and Sciences in German Contexts: Case Studies from the 19th and 20th Centuries. Mohr Siebeck. pp. 128–154. ISBN 978-3-161-49121-4. Archived from the original on 21 July 2023.
- Falk, Raphael (2014). "Genetic markers cannot determine Jewish descent". Frontiers in Genetics. 5: 462. doi:10.3389/fgene.2014.00462. PMC 4301023. PMID 25653666.
- Falk, Raphael (2017). Zionism and the Biology of Jews. History, Philosophy and Theory of the Life Sciences. Springer International Publishing. ISBN 978-3-319-57345-8. Archived from the original on 7 July 2023.
- Fishberg, Maurice (1911). The Jews: A Study of Race and Environment (PDF). Charles Scribner's Sons.
- Gannon, Megan (12 July 2019). "When Ancient DNA Gets Politicized". Smithsonian. Smithsonian Magazine.
- Gelber, Mark H. (2000). "The Rhetoric of Race and Jewish-National Cultural Politics: From Birnbaum and Buber to Brieger's René Richter". Melancholy Pride Nation, Race, and Gender in the German Literature of Cultural Zionism. Max Niemeyer Verlag. pp. 125–160. ISBN 978-3-484-65123-4. Archived from the original on 21 July 2023.
- Gilman, Sander L. (2010). Disease & diagnosis: The second age of biology. Taylor & Francis. ISBN 978-1-351-52209-0.
- Goldstein, David B. (2009). Jacob's Legacy: A Genetic View of Jewish History. Yale University Press. ISBN 978-0-300-15128-2.
- Goldstein, Eric L (January 2005). "Contesting the categories: Jews and government racial classification in the United States". Jewish History. 19 (1): 79–107. doi:10.1007/s10835-005-4359-6. S2CID 159972857. Archived from the original on 21 July 2023.
- Hart, Mitchell B. (June 1999). "Racial Science, Social Science, and the Politics of Jewish Assimilation". Isis. 90 (2): 268–297. doi:10.1086/384324. JSTOR 237051. S2CID 143667571.
- Hart, Mitchell B. (2000). Social Science and the Politics of Modern Jewish Identity. Stanford University Press. ISBN 978-0-804-73824-8.
- Hart, Mitchell B. (January 2005). "Jews, race, and capitalism in the German-Jewish context". Jewish History. 19 (1): 49–63. doi:10.1007/s10835-005-4357-8. S2CID 144189435.
- Hart, Mitchell B. (2011). Jews and Race: Writings on Identity and Difference, 1880-1940. Brandeis library of modern Jewish thought. Brandeis University Press. ISBN 978-1-584-65717-0. Archived from the original on 21 July 2023.
- Hellström, Petter (2013). "Genetic diaspora, genetic return (reviewing N. A. El-Haj, The genealogical science: The search for Jewish origins and the politics of epistemology)". Studies in History and Philosophy of Science Part C: Studies in History and Philosophy of Biological and Biomedical Sciences. 44 (3). Elsevier: 439–442. doi:10.1016/j.shpsc.2013.05.007.
- Hirsch, Dafna (2009). "Zionist eugenics, mixed marriage, and the creation of a 'new Jewish type'". Journal of the Royal Anthropological Institute. 15 (3): 592–609. doi:10.1111/j.1467-9655.2009.01575.x. JSTOR 40541701. Archived from the original on 2 November 2022.
- Hoffman, Matthew (January 2005). "From Pintele Yid to Racenjude: Chaim Zhitlovsky and racial conceptions of Jewishness". Jewish History. 19 (1): 65–78. doi:10.1007/s10835-005-4358-7. S2CID 143976833. Archived from the original on 21 July 2023.
- Jabotinsky, Ze'ev (1961). "A Letter on Autonomy" (PDF). In Pedazhur, Elazar (ed.). Nation and Society: Selected Articles. Jabotinsky Institute of Israel. pp. 37–49. Archived (PDF) from the original on 31 May 2022.
- Kahn, Susan Martha (June 2005). "The multiple meanings of Jewish genes". Culture, Medicine and Psychiatry. 29 (2): 179–192. doi:10.1007/s11013-005-7424-5. PMID 16249949. S2CID 28770419.
- Kahn, Susan Martha (December 2013). "Commentary: Who Are the Jews? New Formulations of an Age-Old Question". Human Biology. 85 (6): 919–924. doi:10.13110/humanbiology.85.6.0919. JSTOR 10.13110/humanbiology.85.6.0919. PMID 25079125. S2CID 201761565. Archived from the original on 8 July 2023.
- Kandiyoti, Dalia (2020). The Converso's Return: Conversion and Sephardi History in Contemporary Literature and Culture. Stanford Studies in Jewish History and Culture. Stanford University Press. ISBN 978-1-5036-1244-0. Archived from the original on 21 July 2023.
- Kiefer, Annegret (1991). Das Problem einer 'jüdischen Rasse': Eine Diskussion zwischen Wissenschaft und Ideologie (1870–1930) [The Problem of a 'Jewish Race': A Discussion between Science and Ideology (1870–1930)] (in German). Peter Lang. ISBN 978-3-631-43874-9.
- Kimel, Sasha Y.; Huesmann, Rowell; Kunst, Jonas R.; Halperin, Eran (30 March 2016). "Living in a Genetic World". Personality and Social Psychology Bulletin. 42 (5): 688–700. doi:10.1177/0146167216642196. PMID 27029578. S2CID 21136940. Archived from the original on 23 January 2023.
- Kirsh, Nurit (December 2003). "Population Genetics in Israel in the 1950s: The Unconscious Internalization of Ideology". Isis. 94 (4). University of Chicago Press: 631–655. doi:10.1086/386385. ISSN 0021-1753. JSTOR 386385. PMID 15077535. S2CID 42708609.
- Kohler, Noa Sophie (2014). "Genes as a Historical Archive: On the Applicability of Genetic Research to Sociohistorical Questions: The Debate on the Origins of Ashkenazi Jewry Revisited". Perspectives in Biology and Medicine. 57 (1). Project MUSE: 105–117. doi:10.1353/pbm.2014.0000. ISSN 1529-8795. PMID 25345705. S2CID 29858311.
- Kohler, Noa Sophie (2022). "What are Jews: interrogating genetic studies and the reification of race" (PDF). Journal of Anthropological Sciences. 101 (100). Istituto Italiano Antropologia: 185–199. doi:10.4436/JASS.10001. PMID 35302512.
- Kornberg, Jacques (1993). Theodor Herzl: From Assimilation to Zionism. Indiana University Press. ISBN 978-0-253-11259-0.
- Leff, Lisa Moses (January 2005). "Self-definition and self-defense: Jewish racial identity in nineteenth-century France". Jewish History. 19 (1): 7–28. doi:10.1007/s10835-005-4355-x. S2CID 144273380.
- Lipphardt, Veronika (2008b). Muller-Wille, S. (ed.). Biohistorical narratives of Jewish History. Contextualizing the Studies of Wilhelm Nussbaum (1896–1985) (PDF). A Cultural History of Heredity IV: Heredity in the Century of the Gene. Preprint (Max-Planck-Institut für Wissenschaftsgeschichte). Max-Planck-Institute for the History of Science. pp. 191–212.
- Lipphardt, Veronika (April 2012). "Isolates and Crosses in Human Population Genetics; or, A Contextualization of German Race Science". Current Anthropology. 53 (S5): S69–S82. doi:10.1086/662574. JSTOR 662574. S2CID 161578154.
- McGonigle, Ian V. (2021). Genomic Citizenship: The Molecularization of Identity in the Contemporary Middle East. MIT Press. ISBN 978-0-262-36669-4. Archived from the original on 8 July 2023.
- Morris-Reich, Amos (Fall 2006). "Arthur Ruppin's Concept of Race". Israel Studies. 11 (3): 1–30. doi:10.2979/ISR.2006.11.3.1. JSTOR 30245648. S2CID 144898510.
- Mosse, George L. (2023) [First published 1970]. "The Influence of the Völkisch Idea on German Jewry". Germans and Jews: The Right, the Left, and the Search for a "Third Force" in Pre-Nazi Germany. Wisconsin University Press. pp. 54–79. ISBN 978-0-299-34284-5. Archived from the original on 21 July 2023.
- Nicosia, Francis R. (2010). Zionism and Anti-Semitism in Nazi Germany. Cambridge University Press. ISBN 978-0-521-17298-1.
- Olson, Jess (November 2007). "he Late Zionism of Nathan Birnbaum: The Herzl Controversy Reconsidered". AJS Review. 31 (2): 241–276. doi:10.1017/S0364009407000517. JSTOR 27564291. S2CID 161907484.
- Ostrer, Harry (2012). A Genetic History of the Jewish People. Oxford University Press. ISBN 978-3-319-57345-8. Archived from the original on 1 July 2023.
- Ostrer, Harry (22 March 2020). "The Genetic Origins of Ashkenazi Jews". Avotaynu.
- Parfitt, Tudor; Egorova, Yulia (2005). "Genetics, History and identity: The case of the Bene Israel and the Lemba Culture". Culture, Medicine and Psychiatry. 29 (2): 193–224. doi:10.1007/s11013-005-7425-4. PMID 16249950. S2CID 19691358. Archived from the original on 21 July 2023.
- Patai, Raphael; Patai, Jennifer (1989). The Myth of the Jewish Race. Jewish Folklore and Anthropology Series (Revised ed.). Wayne State University Press. ISBN 978-0-8143-1948-2.
- Pollack, Robert (13 April 2013). "Ruth the Moabite, David the King, and the Fallacy of Biological Judaism" (PDF). Kol Hadash. B'nai Yeshurun.
- Prainsack, Barbara; Hashiloni-Dolev, Yael (2009). "Religion and nationhood: Collective identities and the New Genetics: Example 2: 'Falsifying' difference: the story of common ancestry of Palestinian Arabs and Jews". In Atkinson, P.; Glasner, P.; Lock, M. (eds.). The Handbook of Genetics & Society: Mapping the New Genomic Era. Taylor & Francis. pp. 404–421. ISBN 978-1-134-12877-8.
- Presner, Todd Samuel (2007). Muscular Judaism: The Jewish Body and the Politics of Regeneration. Taylor & Francis. ISBN 978-1-135-98226-3.
- Ram, Uri (2002). "Historiosphical Foundations of the Historical Strife in Israel". In Shapira, Anita; Penslar, Derek Jonathan (eds.). Israeli Historical Revisionism: from left to right. Routledge. pp. 57–58. ISBN 978-0-7146-5379-2.
- Rich, Dave (25 April 2017). "Anti-Judaism, Antisemitism, and Delegitimizing Israel". Israel Journal of Foreign Affairs. 11 (1): 101–104. doi:10.1080/23739770.2017.1315682. S2CID 152132582. Archived from the original on 8 July 2023.
- Salamon, Hagar (January–April 2003). "Blackness in Transition: Decoding Racial Constructs throughStories of Ethiopian Jews". Journal of Folklore Research. 40 (1): 3–32. doi:10.2979/JFR.2003.40.1.3. JSTOR 3814642.
- Satlow, Michael L. (August 2018). "Cynthia M. Baker, Jew, (New Brunswick, NJ and London: Rutgers University Press, 2017), pp. xiii-190" (PDF). Quest. Issues in Contemporary Jewish History (13). CDEC: 185–195. doi:10.48248/issn.2037-741X/718.
- Schaffer, Gavin (2010). "Dilemmas of Jewish Difference: Reflections on Contemporary Research into Jewish Origins and Types from an Anglo-Jewish Historical Perspective". Jewish Culture and History. 12 (1–2). Informa UK Limited: 75–94. doi:10.1080/1462169x.2010.10512145. S2CID 143496144. Archived from the original on 30 October 2022.
- Sokoloff, Naomi B.; Glenn, Susan A. (2011). "Who and What is Jewish? Controversies and Comparative Perspectives on the Boundaries of Jewish Identity". In Sokoloff, Naomi B.; Glenn, Susan A. (eds.). Boundaries of Jewish Identity. University of Washington Press. pp. 3–11. ISBN 978-0-295-80083-7.
- Tamarkin, Noah (2015), Jewish Genetics, Oxford Bibliographies, Oxford University Press, doi:10.1093/obo/9780199840731-0112, archived from the original on 10 November 2022
- Tanny, Jarrod (20 May 2013). "What 'Jews a Race' Debate Means for Israel". The Forward.
- Tekiner, Roselle (1991). "Race and the Issue of National Identity in Israel". International Journal of Middle East Studies. 23 (1). Cambridge University Press: 39–55. doi:10.1017/S0020743800034541. ISSN 0020-7438. JSTOR 163931. S2CID 163043582.
- Vogt, Stefan (2014). "Zwischen Humanismus und Nationalismus. Die Rezeption völkisch-nationalen Denkens im deutschsprachigen Zionismus" [Between Humanism and Nationalism. The Reception of Ethnic-National Thought in German-Speaking Zionism]. In Gust, Kerstin; Wilhelm, Karin (eds.). Neue Städte für einen neuen Staat: Die städtebauliche Erfindung des modernen Israel und der Wiederaufbau in der BRD. Eine Annäherung [New Cities for a New State: The Urban Invention of Modern Israel and the Reconstruction in the Federal Republic of Germany. An Approach] (in German). transcript-Verlag. pp. 228–236. ISBN 978-3-839-42204-5.
- Vogt, Stefan (2015). "Between Decay and Doom: Zionist Discourses of "Untergang" in Germany, 1890 to 1933". In Aschheim, Steven E.; Liska, Vivian (eds.). The German-Jewish Experience Revisited. De Gruyter. pp. 75–102. doi:10.1515/9783110367195-006. ISBN 978-3-110-37293-9.
- Vogt, Stefan (2016). Subalterne Positionierungen: Der deutsche Zionismus im Feld des Nationalismus in Deutschland, 1890-1933 [Subaltern Positionings: German Zionism in the Field of Nationalism in Germany, 1890-1933]. Wallstein Verlag. ISBN 978-3-8353-1951-6.
- Weikart, Richard (2008). "The Impact of Social Darwinism on Anti-Semitic Ideology in Germany and Austria, 1860–1945". In Cantor, Geoffrey; Swetlitz, Marc (eds.). Jewish Tradition and the Challenge of Darwinism. University of Chicago Press. pp. 93–115. ISBN 978-0-226-09301-7.
- Weitzman, Steven (2019). "Biological Approaches to the Origin of the Jews". The Origin of the Jews: The Quest for Roots in a Rootless Age. Princeton University Press. ISBN 978-0-691-19165-2.
- Zimmermann, Moshe (1987). Wilhelm Marr: The Patriarch of Anti-Semitism. Oxford University Press. ISBN 978-0-195-36495-8.
