= Elisabeth Goldschmidt =

Israeli geneticist (1912–1970)

- אליזבת גולדשמידט
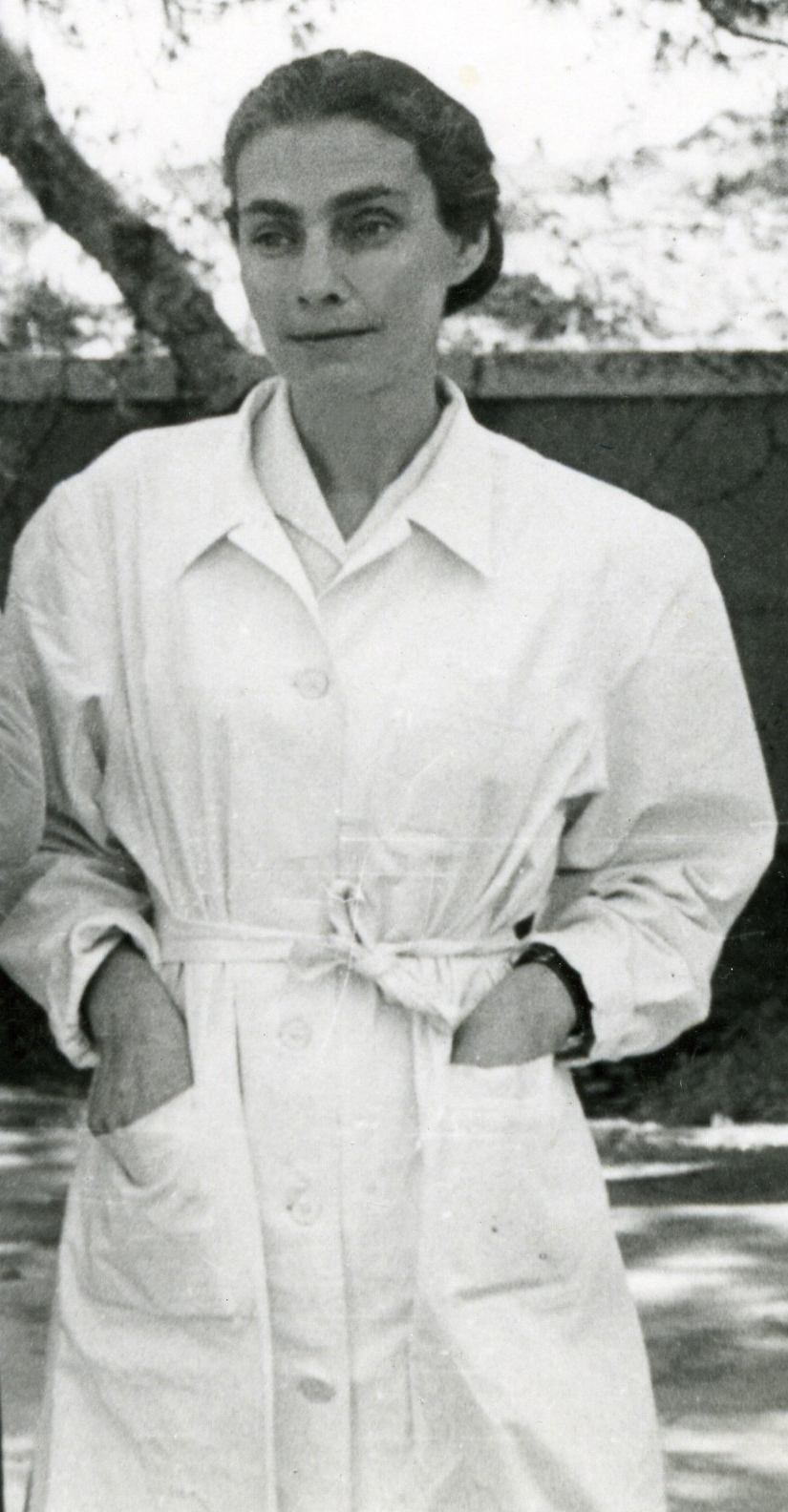
- Born: Elisabeth Wechsler; September 22, 1912; Frankfurt, Germany
- Died: May 6, 1970 (aged 57)
- Education: Hebrew University of Jerusalem
- Spouse: Yosef Goldschmidt
- Children: Eliezer Goldschmidt; Yemima Ben-Menahem
- Scientific career
- Fields: Genetics
- Workplaces: Hebrew University of Jerusalem
- Thesis: Cytological studies in Chironomidae (1942)

Elisabeth Goldschmidt (née Wechsler; Hebrew: אליזבת גולדשמידט; September 22, 1912 – May 6, 1970) was a German-born Israeli geneticist who founded the genetics program at the Hebrew University of Jerusalem. She has been described as "the founding mother of the field of genetics in Israel".

== Early life and education ==
Goldschmidt was born Elisabeth Wechsler into an Orthodox Jewish family in Frankfurt, Germany, on September 22, 1912. She began studying medicine at the University of Frankfurt in 1932, but after Adolf Hitler rose to power in Germany the following year, she dropped out and moved to London, England. There she went on to study botany and zoology, receiving her B.Sc. degree in 1936. She then emigrated to Jerusalem with her husband, Joseph Goldschmidt. She earned her Ph.D. from the Hebrew University of Jerusalem in 1942 with a thesis entitled Cytological studies in Chironomidae.

== Career ==
After receiving her Ph.D. from the Hebrew University of Jerusalem, Goldschmidt became a junior assistant in the Department of Zoology there. In 1950, she was promoted to Instructor in Genetics at the university, and in the same year she was awarded a fellowship from the American Association of University Women. This fellowship led to her traveling to the United States for a year, where she worked in the laboratories of Theodosius Dobzhansky and Curt Stern. Upon returning to the Hebrew University of Jerusalem in 1951, she resumed her genetics research and began teaching the subject to medical students. In 1961, with Chaim Sheba and Raphael Falk, she organized a Conference on Human Population Genetics, and by 1963 she had worked with her students to found the Laboratory of Genetics (later the Department of Genetics) at the Hebrew University. She also worked with Tirza Cohen to establish the first genetic counseling clinic in Israel at Hadassah Hospital.

== Research ==
Early in her career, Goldschmidt focused her research on the adaptation of certain organisms to conditions of extreme salinity. She later began researching population genetics in Drosophila flies. She learned the technique of paper chromatography from visiting Ernst Hadorn's lab in 1953, and she went on to apply this in her research. She was also interested in researching the genetic basis of human diseases such as Tay–Sachs disease.

== Personal life and death ==
Goldschmidt and her husband, Joseph Goldschmidt, had a son, Eliezer Goldschmidt, and a daughter, Yemima Ben-Menachem. She committed suicide on May 6, 1970.
