= Zionism is racism (disambiguation) =

Zionism is racism may refer to:

- United Nations General Assembly Resolution 3379
- Zionism is Racism (motion)
- Racial conceptions of Jewish identity in Zionism
- Zionism as settler colonialism
