= Yemima Ben-Menahem =

Israeli Philosopher

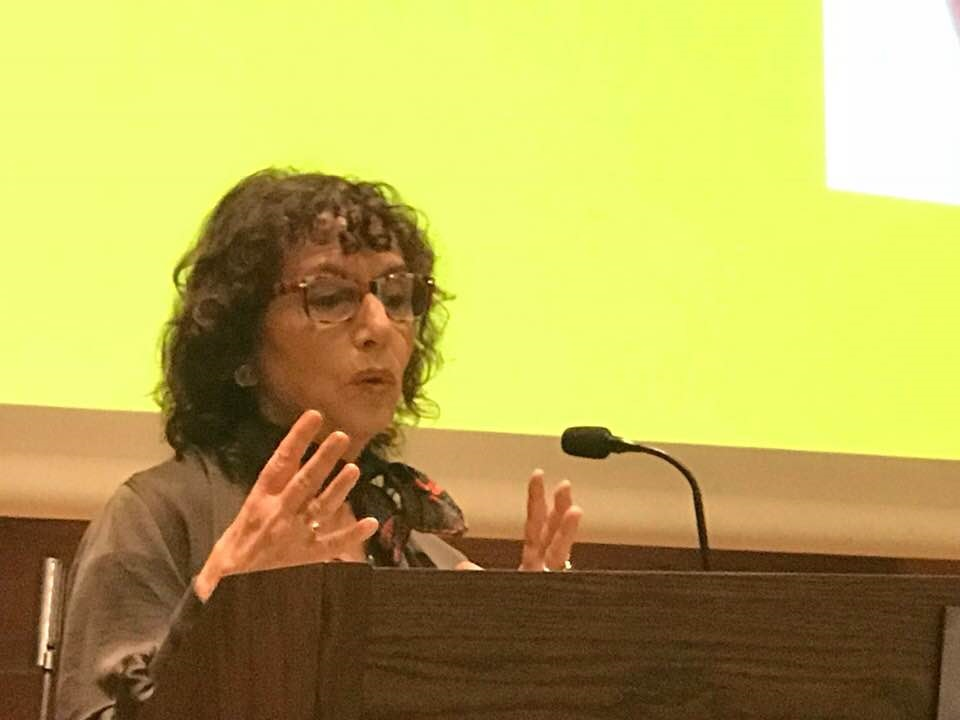
- Born: 23 December 1946 (age 79); Jerusalem, Israel

Education
- Education: Hebrew University of Jerusalem
- Doctoral advisors: Mark Steiner

Philosophical work
- Era: Contemporary philosophy
- Region: Western philosophy
- Main interests: philosophy of science; Philosophy of modern physics; Philosophy of history

Yemima Ben-Menahem (Hebrew: ימימה בן-מנחם; born 23 December 1946) is a professor (Emerita) of philosophy at the Hebrew University of Jerusalem. Her main area of expertise is philosophy of science, in particular philosophy of modern physics.

== Biography ==
Yemima Goldschmidt (later Ben-Menahem) earned a BSc in physics and mathematics in 1969 and an MSc (summa cum laude) in philosophy of science in 1972, both from the Hebrew University of Jerusalem. She earned her PhD at the Hebrew University in 1983 with a dissertation entitled "Paradoxes and Intuitions", under the direction of Mark Steiner.

Ben-Menachem is married to Hanina Ben-Menachem, a professor of law at Hebrew University, with whom she has four children. Her mother was Elisabeth Goldschmidt, a pioneer of genetic research in Israel, and her father Yosef Goldschmidt, a Knesset Member and Deputy Minister representing the National Religious Party.

== Academic career ==
In 2001, Ben-Menahem founded the Journal Aleph: Historical Studies in Science and Judaism. She served as Director of the Edelstein Center for the History and Philosophy of Science, Technology and Medicine at the Hebrew University. Since 2006, she has been member of the Academic Board of the Einstein Papers Project.

In 2007, she curated the exhibition Newton's Secrets at the National Library of Israel.

Ben-Menahem devoted several papers and a book to conventionalism, a position first articulated by Henri Poincaré in the context of geometry. According to conventionalists, many of the assertions we take to express objective truths, are in fact conventions in disguise, derived from definitions or methodological decisions that are not forced on us by logic, mathematics, or empirical fact, and about which we have discretion. Ben-Menahem reads twentieth century science and philosophy from the perspective of the impact of conventionalism on these fields. The pronounced influence of conventionalism, according to her, is manifest in the philosophy of logic and mathematics, the theory of relativity, and the writings of leading twentieth century philosophers including Carnap, Wittgenstein, Putnam, and Quine.

Ben-Menahem has written on Jorge Luis Borges, Donald Davidson, Michel Foucault, William James, Emil Meyerson, Henri Poincaré.

== Awards and recognition ==
In 2022, Ben-Menachem won the Israel Prize for the study of philosophy and religious sciences.

== Published works ==
- Conventionalism (Cambridge University Press, 2006)
- Causation in Science (Princeton University Press, 2018)

=== Books edited ===
- Hilary Putnam (Cambridge University Press, 2005)
- Probability in Physics (with Meir Hemmo) (Springer, 2012)

== Selected articles ==
- "Natural Laws and Human Language" in Engaging Putnam J. Conant and S. Chakraborty (eds.) (De Greuter) (2020) (forthcoming).
- (With Hanina Ben-Menahem) "The Rule of Law: Natural, Human and Divine" Studies in the History and Philosophy of Science 35 (2020) 139–159.
- "The PBR Theorem: Whose Side is it On?" Studies in the History and Philosophy of Modern Physics 57 (2017) 80–88.
- "Borges on Replication and Concept Formation" in: Stepping in the Same River Twice, A. Shavit and A.M. Ellison (eds.) (Yale University Press) (2017) 23–36.
- "If Counterfactuals Were Excluded from Historical Reasoning..." Journal of the Philosophy of History 10 (2016) 370–381
- "The Web and the Tree: Quine and James on the Growth of Knowledge" in Quine and His Place in History, F. Janssen-Lauret and G. Kemp (eds) Palgrave (2016) 59–75.
- "Poincare's Impact on Twentieth Century Physics" HOPOS 6 (2016) 257–273.
- "Revisiting the Refutation of Conventionalism", The Library of Living Philosophers XXXIV, The Philosophy of Hilary Putnam, E. Auxier, D.R. Anderson, L.E. Hahn (eds), Open Court (2015) 451–478.
- "Historical Necessity and Contingency" in: The Blackwell Companion to the Philosophy of History, A. Tucker (ed) Blackwells (2009) 120–130
- "Convention: Poincare and Some of his Critics", British Journal for the philosophy of Science 52 (2001) 471–513.
- "Direction and Description", Studies in the History and Philosophy of Modern Physics 32 (2001) 621–635.
- "Dummett Versus Bell on Quantum Mechanics", Studies in the History and Philosophy of Modern Physics 28(1997) 277–290.
- "Equivalent Descriptions", The British Journal for the Philosophy of Science, 41(1990) 261–279.
- "The Inference to the Best Explanation", Erkenntnis 33 (1990) 319- 344.

== See also ==
- Women of Israel
