= Eliezer E. Goldschmidt =

Israeli academic

- אליעזר גולדשמידט
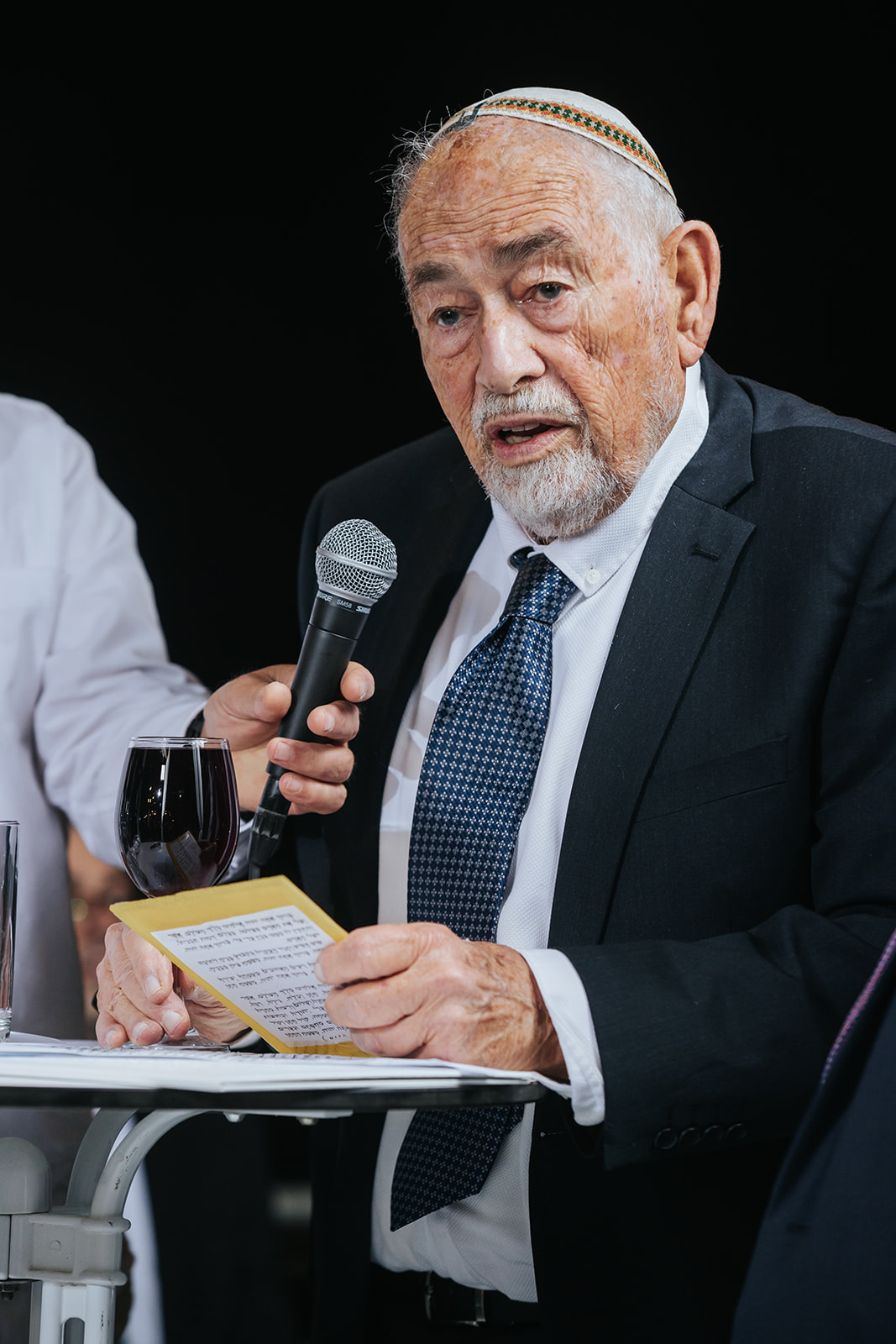
- Born: 1938 (age 87–88); Jerusalem
- Citizenship: Israel
- Known for: Research on Etrog citron and more
- Scientific career
- Fields: Horticulture
- Institutions: Hebrew University of Jerusalem

Eliezer E. Goldschmidt (Hebrew: אליעזר גולדשמידט; born 1938, in Jerusalem) is an emeritus professor of agriculture at the Hebrew University of Jerusalem. He earned his Ph.D. in 1968 and has been a professor since 1982.

== Biography ==
Eliezer Goldschmidt was born in Jerusalem in 1938, the eldest son of Joseph Goldschmidt and Elisheva Goldschmidt. He is the elder brother of Prof. Yamima Ben Menachem. Studied at Horev Elementary School and Mizrahi High School for Boys. He was a member of the Nahal core of the Ezra youth movement. In 1955 he studied for one year at the HaDrom yeshiva in Rehovot. In the summer of 1956, he enlisted in the Nahal. After training at Beit Dras, he completed his military service at Kibbutz Hefetz Chaim.

Between 1958 and 1961 he studied for a bachelor's degree at the Faculty of Agriculture at the Hebrew University. In 1963 he completed his master's degree, his dissertation dealt with the examination of the peroxidase enzyme system in citrus tissues. In 1968 he finished his doctorate; The doctoral thesis dealt with the hormonal systems that supervise the growth of branches in citrus trees. In 1970, he completed his post-doctorate in the laboratory of Prof. Jerome Schiff, at Brandeis University in Boston, and was involved in biochemical research on sulfur reduction in algae.

While living in Boston, he met Rabbi Yosef Dov HaLevi Soloveitchik, who ordained him as a rabbi in 1979.

Goldschmidt returned to Israel to the Hebrew University. Between 1972 and 1977 he served as a senior lecturer in the Faculty of Agriculture, in 1978 he became an associate professor, and in 1983 he became a full professor. In 1999 he was appointed the holder of the James de Rothschild Chair of Horticulture.

Goldschmidt Conducted courses for bachelor's and master's degrees in horticulture, citrus, plant hormones, plant physiology and the laws that depend on Israel's land. He also supervised twenty-six doctoral students and many master's students.

Among his positions at the Hebrew University's Faculty of Agriculture, he previously served as chairman of the committee for graduate students in agriculture and applied biology (1986-1990); chairman of the teaching committee (1980-1983); Acting Head of the Department of Horticulture (1978) and Chairman of Plant Science Studies (2001-2003). He was also a member of the Hebrew University's Senior Appointments Committee for Life Sciences (1991-1993), and a member of the Hebrew University's Senior Appointments Committee for Humanities and Social Sciences ( 2000-2003). He held two positions in the Bard Fund for Agricultural Developments United States-Israel: Chairman of the Foundation's Interdisciplinary Evaluation Committee (1982), and Chairman of the Field Crops and Orchards Evaluation Committee (2004-2006). In addition, he also served as a member of the Israel Marketing Council Peri Hadar (1987-1996) and Chairman of the Scientific Council of the University Botanical Gardens in Jerusalem (2002).

Goldschmidt would appear around the holidays on various television programs and explain the plants associated with the holiday.

Prof. Goldschmidt retired in 2006.

== Contributions ==
His research has focused on general agriculture and on various citrus species.

He is primarily known for his research on citron genetics and shape variability. He developed an auxin which is instrumental in preserving the style and stigma of the citron; these features figure prominently in determining the halachic status of individual citrons for use as etrogim.

Since retiring from the Hebrew University, he has continued his work on projects to lengthen the shelf life of produce and to increase the productivity of wheat.

== Selected publications ==
Goldschmidt, EE; Huber, SC (1992). "Regulation of photosynthesis by end-product accumulation in leaves of plants storing starch, sucrose, and hexose sugars". Plant Physiology. 99 (4): 1443–1448. doi:10.1104/pp.99.4.1443. PMC 1080645. PMID 16669056.

Trebitsh, T; Goldschmidt, EE; Riov, J (1993). "Ethylene induces de novo synthesis of chlorophyllase, a chlorophyll degrading enzyme, in citrus fruit peel". Proceedings of the National Academy of Sciences of the United States of America. 90 (20): 9441–9445. Bibcode:1993PNAS...90.9441T. doi:10.1073/pnas.90.20.9441. PMC 47584. PMID 11607429.

Jacob-Wilk, D; Holland, D; Goldschmidt, EE; Riov, J; Eyal, Y (1999). "Chlorophyll breakdown by chlorophyllase: Isolation and functional expression of the Chlase1 gene from ethylene-treated Citrus fruit and its regulation during development". Plant Journal. 20 (6): 653–661. doi:10.1046/j.1365-313X.1999.00637.x. PMID 10652137.

Droby, S; Vinokur, V; Weiss, B; Cohen, L; Daus, A; Goldschmidt, EE; Porat, R (2002). "Induction of resistance to Penicillium digitatum in grapefruit by the yeast biocontrol agent Candida oleophila". Phytopathology. 92 (4): 393–399. Bibcode:2002PhPat..92..393D. doi:10.1094/PHYTO.2002.92.4.393. PMID 18942952.

Mudge, Ken; Janick, Jules; Scofield, Steven; Goldschmidt, EE (2009). "Chapter 9: A History of Grafting". In Janick, Jules (ed.). Horticultural Reviews. Vol. 35. Hoboken, New Jersey: John Wiley & Sons, Inc. pp. 437–493. doi:10.1002/9780470593776. ISBN 978-0470-38642-2.
