= Politics of archaeology in Israel and Palestine =

Part of the Israeli–Palestinian conflict

Archaeology has a significant presence in the politics and social fabric of Israel and Palestine. Many important developments in Levantine archaeology have occurred within Israel and Palestine.

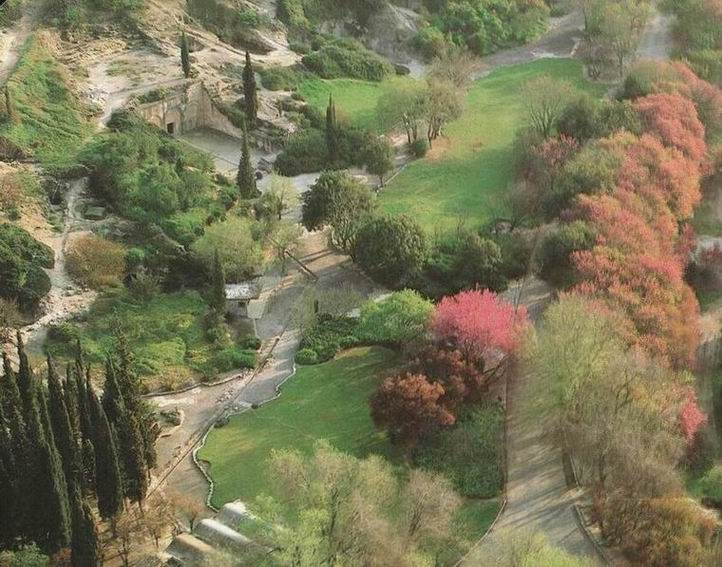
Beth She'arim

Before 1946, the Department of Antiquities of the British administration of Mandatory Palestine was jointly staffed by citizens of the United Kingdom, Arabs, and Jews. After the creation of the Hashemite Kingdom of Jordan and the state of Israel, the Department was split into several smaller departments. According to Hallote and Joffe, Israel's Department of Antiquities and Museums "attracted relatively little attention from religious Jews," and a 1950s excavation of burial caves at Beth She'arim "did not elicit a great response from religious groups." Israel also organized its archaeological activities so as to position the country's high culture on a global stage. The politicization of archaeology, which Hallote and Joffe attribute to "popular interest of religious nationalist groups," did not begin in earnest until after the Six-Day War.

== Yadin and Masada ==
Yigael Yadin, a professor of archaeology at Hebrew University, had previously been the second Chief of Staff of the Israel Defense Forces. As an archaeologist, in 1960, he discovered papyrus scrolls written by Simon Bar Kokhba, leader of the Bar-Kokhba Revolt. The find was kept secret for a month, before being revealed at a ceremony attended by various Israeli leaders and the international media. A subsequent Yadin lecture at the Mann Auditorium in Tel Aviv attracted around three-thousand people.

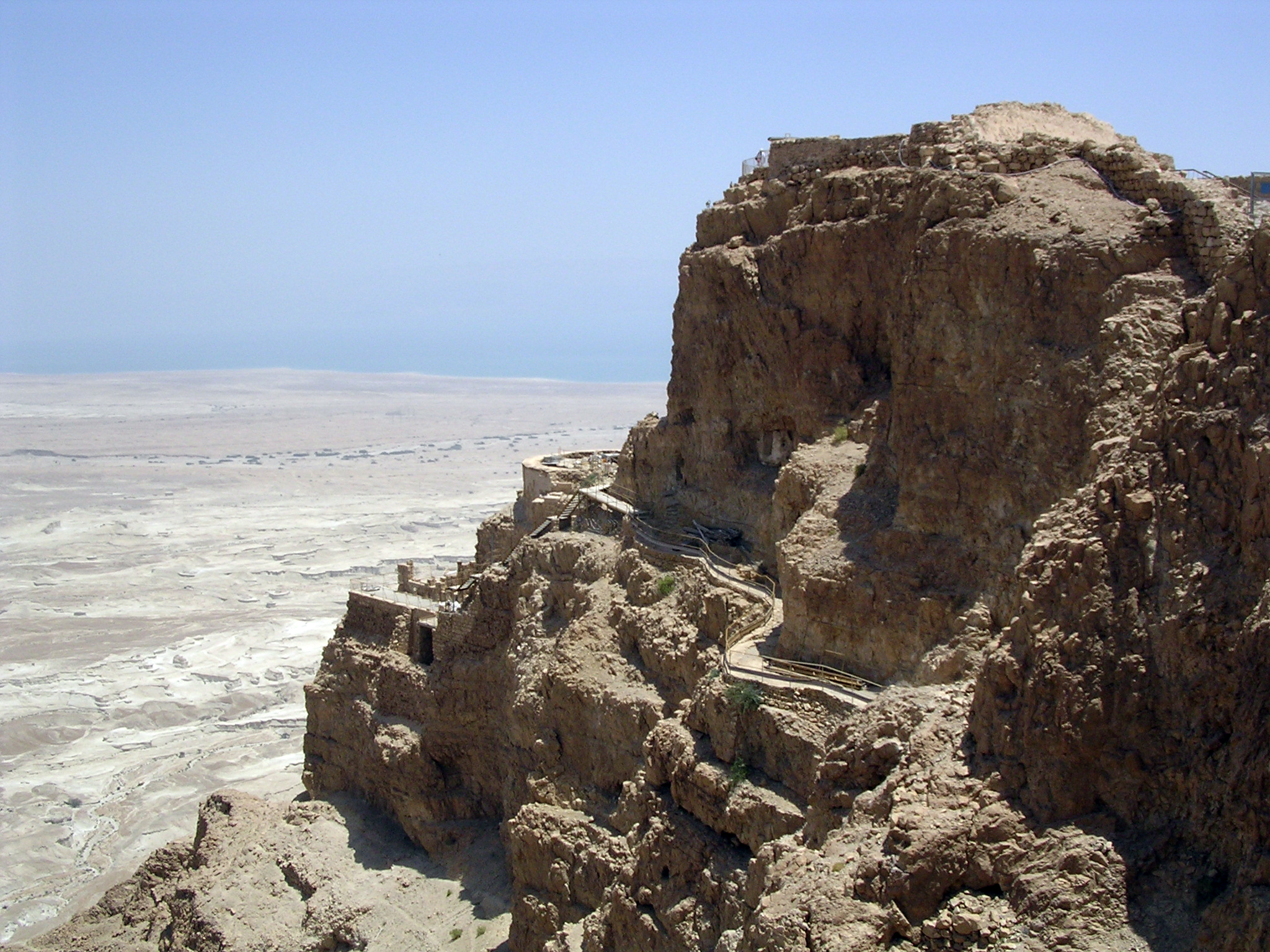
Masada

Beginning in October 1963, Yadin led excavations at Masada, which currently serves as the swearing-in site of new Israel Defense Forces soldiers. Personnel and resources were provided by the Army during the digs; the first ended in May 1964, and the second lasted from November 1964 to April 1965. Upon publishing his findings, Yadin commented on the religious and political relevance of the site, calling it "an undying symbol of desperate courage, a symbol which has stirred hearts throughout the last nineteen centuries."

The excavations were noted worldwide, and Yadin parlayed his new fame into a political career, eventually becoming deputy Prime Minister to Menachem Begin. Nachman Ben-Yehuda later argued that Yadin discredited Josephus' assertion that the rebels in Masada were Sicarii. Yehuda charged that Yadin "certainly used his very high credibility" as a veteran and professor "to bulldoze his overhauled version of Josephus Flavius concerning the events at Masada." Abraham Rabinovich credits the later excavations for "opening the way for the desert mount's becoming a major tourist site." American archaeologist Jodi Magness has written archaeology cannot prove or disprove the account of Josephus because the human remains found can be interpreted differently.

== The Six-Day War ==
In 1967, the Six-Day War caused significant disruptions in archaeological activities in the region. American students and personnel at Hebrew Union College were urged to evacuate, and a planned excavation of the Gezer site, on June 26, was cancelled. The British School of Archaeology in Jerusalem suffered only minor damage, but the Palestine Archaeological Museum fared worse. As William G. Dever reports, "the exterior of this beautiful building was pock-marked by small-arms fire, particularly around the inner courtyard, and...the tower, which had been used as a gun position by the Jordanians, was rather badly damaged....Precious objects...lay broken by ricocheting bullets....The Dead Sea Scrolls Gallery was empty." The breakout of the war prompted indefinite suspension of excavation in the West Bank.

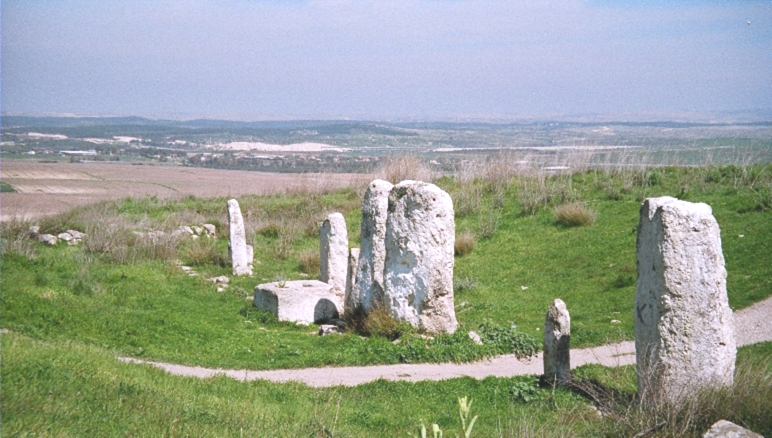
Gezer

Excavation activities resumed on June 15, at Givat Shaul, followed by the resumption of work at Gezer on July 17. July 20 saw the initiation of a project at Tel Arad. After Israeli forces had gained control of the West Bank, the Israel Department of Antiquities laid claim to the area's notable archaeological sites. According to Dever, Israeli archaeologists hadn't had access to the sites since 1948. Subsequently, groups of experts visited Gibeon, Samaria, Shechem, and Tell el-Farah (North), and an "emergency survey" of archaeological sites (so-called because it was assumed that the captured territories would soon be returned to Jordan) was put into motion, eventually recording some 6,000 sites, of which 5,000 were previously unrecorded.

== Postwar period ==
According to the archaeologist Albert Glock, archaeology has been used selectively by both Christian and Jewish Zionists to reconstruct a version of Palestine consonant with their respective ideologues and to provide a warrant for occupying the country.

Almost 60% of the West Bank's cultural archaeological heritage the lies in Area C, which falls under full Israeli control. Israel does not allow Palestinian institutes to explore and safeguard this heritage, with the result that much of the area is subject to sacking. According to the Palestinian Department of Antiquites and Cultural Heritage upwards of 120,000 objects are smuggled out of Palestine. Plundering of sites has increased dramatically on each occasion when an intifada broke out, closing off Israel to Palestinian labour. The groundwork is done by Palestinian looters, and the results funneled through Jerusalem, the main transit point for Palestinian middlemen offloading the wares on the Israeli antiquities market. Many looters regard these sites as "negative heritage" since were it retrieved it would not remain in the West Bank as part of Palestinian cultural heritage.

Israeli archaeology in the West Bank has focused on the Biblical remains to the exclusion of the ancient pagan, Christian Byzantine and Muslim strata. Some sites of no Jewish relevance are left to decay. The important prehistoric archaeological site the Shuqba Cave was separated from the Palestinian villager of Shuqba from which it took its name, and the Wadi Natuf area became a dumping site full of garbage and litter or was crossed by a settlement road, with an exit ramp to allow trucks from settlements to offload their waste there. Many Palestinian heritage sites within the West Bank have been added to the Jewish heritage list. Notable examples where West Bank cultural properties have been expropriated wholly or in part from Palestinian control are the Herodium, Joseph's Tomb in Nablus, the Cave of the Patriarchs in Hebron. Rachel's Tomb and the Tomb of Jesse and Ruth in Tel Rumeida, Hebron. Qumran is in the West Bank but entirely controlled by Israeli authorities, and Israeli advertisement abroad have suggested that the site is in Israel. (Note: The British Advertising Standards Committee demanded in 2008 that the Israeli Ministry of Tourism take down advertisements suggesting that Qumran was in Israel.) Israeli authorities have justified this by pointing out that they are ensuring freedom of worship and protecting the integrity of the sites. Even so, worship is limited. For example, Jewish worship at Joseph’s Tomb is only conducted once a month, from midnight to 6 am. Worship at Rachel’s Tomb is only possible because of a highly fortified concrete barriers. Joseph’s Tomb was torched hours after the IDF evacuated the site in 2000.

Religious opposition to certain archaeological practices in Israel began in the late 1970s and intensified through the 1980s. Objections were raised to the excavation of the City of David in Jerusalem, for which project director Yigal Shiloh was publicly vilified. The situation escalated in 1981 when members of several different religious sects threw stones at archaeologists at the site. The confrontation, led by Shlomo Goren and Ovadia Yosef, resulted from the sects' allegation that the excavation was affecting a Jewish cemetery (which Hallote and Joffe claim did not exist). Education Minister Zevulun Hammer eventually ordered the excavation to be halted, but the High Court of Israel overturned his decision. Throughout the 1980s, activists identifying with the ultra-Orthodox Haredi movement were supported by Toldot Aharon and Agudat Israel in clashes at archaeological sites. Notably, in 1983, activists in Jerusalem damaged archaeologists' offices and graves in which archaeologists were buried.

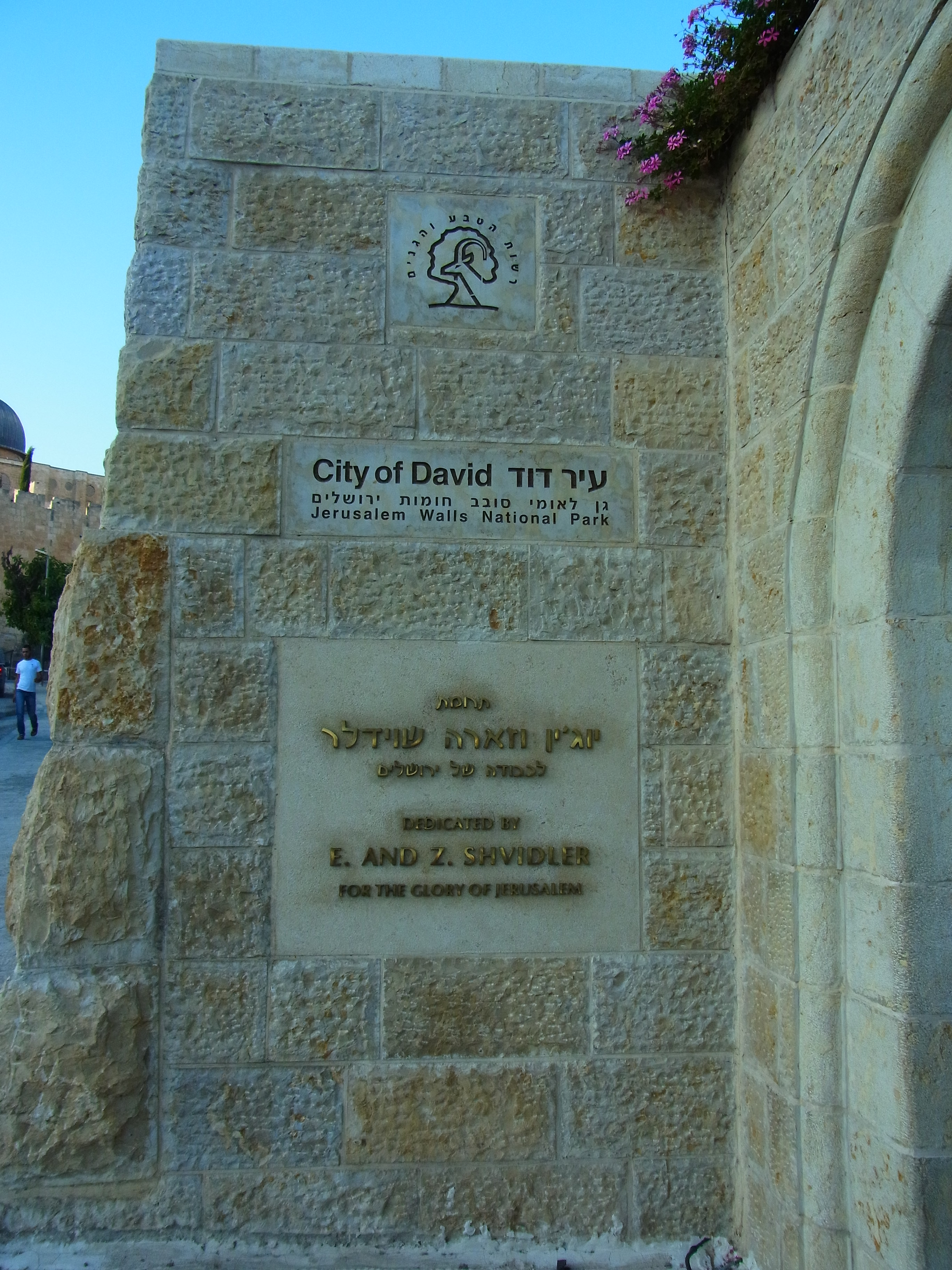
City of David

By 1987, protests had reached American excavations at Caesarea. Archaeological operations were curtailed by the start of the First Intifada later that year. In 1992 a Greek mosaic was damaged in retaliation for the discovery of a crypt containing human bones under an Armenian church.

== Operation Scroll ==
"Operation Scroll" is the term for a 1993 effort by the Israeli Antiquities Authority to discover more of the Dead Sea Scrolls in the Judean Desert. Several archaeologists searched between Wadi ed-Daliya and Nahal Deregot, surveying six hundred and fifty caves and sites, and ultimately excavating seventy of them. The earliest finds were from the Neolithic era, and there were many artifacts unearthed from the time of Bar Kokhba. At approximately the same time as this operation, the Oslo Accords were being written; the IAA was subsequently criticized for taking advantage of the timing. In November 1993, ultra-Orthodox Jews rioted in Jerusalem in response to archaeologists' allegedly excavating Jewish graves. Demonstrations in the city were organized by the Atra Kadisha religious group. Operation Scroll came under fire for possibly defying a new agreement reached by Israel and the Palestine Liberation Organization regarding Palestinian self-rule, and may have circumvented a United Nations resolution that prohibited unearthing and removal of significant artifacts from occupied areas under foreign control.

== Controversy ==
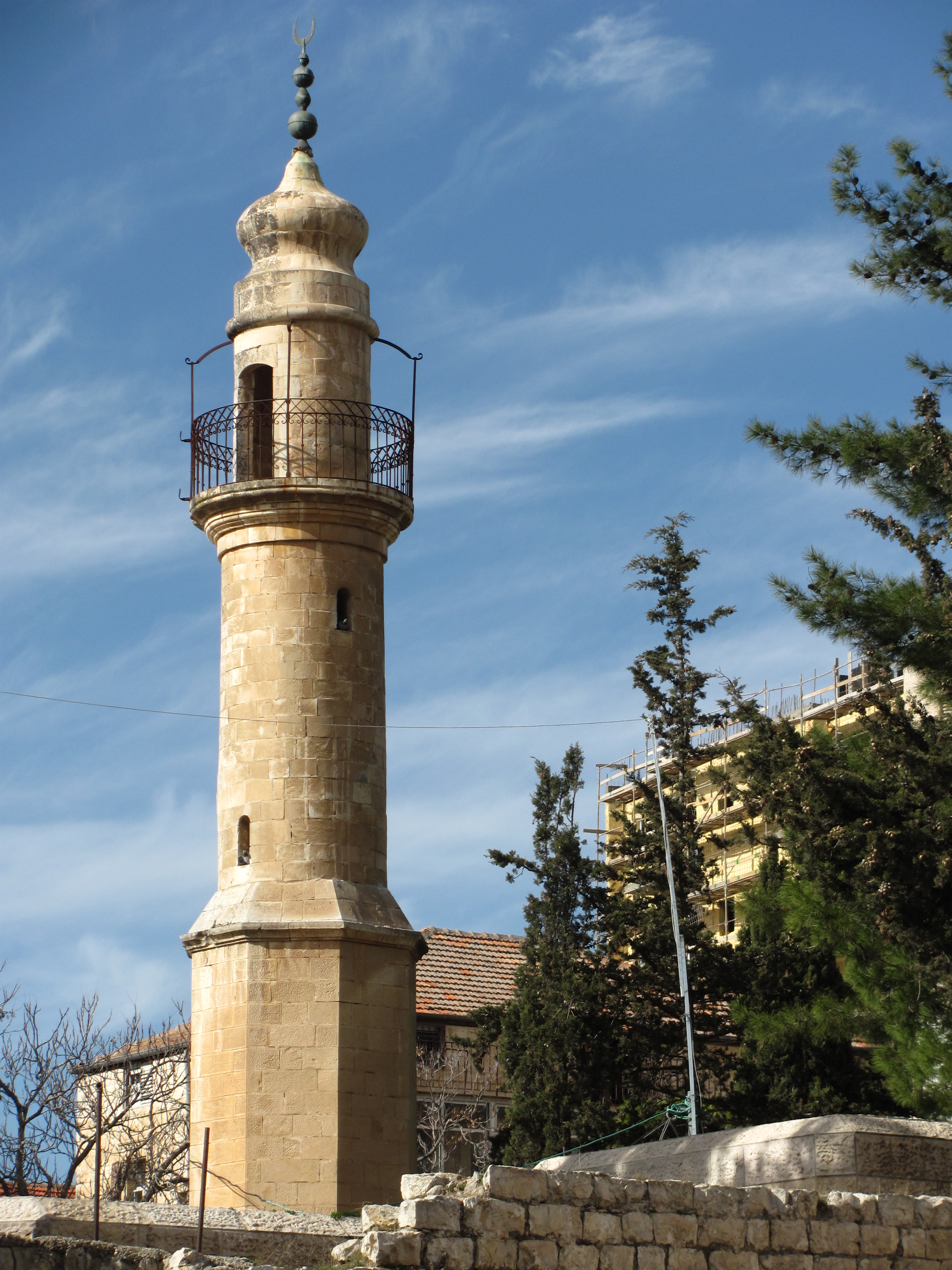
The Nebi Akasha Mosque in Jerusalem

In an archaeological context, animosity has existed between Israeli journalists and officials and their Palestinian counterparts, particularly from the 1990s into the 2010s. In a 1992 article in Ha'aretz, Israeli journalist Yosi Torpstein examined what he called "the large-scale theft of antiquities" by Palestinian looters. American academic Nadia Abu El Haj describes "Operation Scroll," a 1993 "salvage excavation" in Jericho that was launched in advance of Israel's pullout from the West Bank town. Abu El Haj's 2001 book Facts on the Ground was released to some controversy; archaeologist Alexander H. Joffe published a highly-critical review in which he described Abu El Haj's methods as "schizophrenic" and asserted that the book is "a representation of Israeli archaeology that is simply bizarre." Facts on the Ground won the Albert Hourani Book Award for 2002.

Several sites of archaeological significance have been targeted in apparent price tag attacks in the region, which have allegedly been carried out by what Ha'aretz termed "Hard-line Jewish youths." In December 2011, arsonists attempted to set a Palestinian mosque on fire in the West Bank, near Ariel. Palestinian witnesses reported that Israeli settlers were responsible for the predawn attack, in which several of the mosque's windows were broken and its entrance sustained burns. One week later, the Nebi Akasha Mosque in central Jerusalem was burned. The mosque, located in an Ultra-Orthodox neighborhood, was built in the 12th century and expanded in the 13th century. It was reportedly built on a burial ground for soldiers allied with Saladin. In September 2012, graffiti was sprayed on a mosque in Dura, near Hebron. The vandalism referred to the then-recent evacuation of the Migron settlement in the West Bank. Vandals attempted to burn down the mosque and nearby vehicles.

== Sources ==
- Friedman, Robert (Autumn 1983). "Israeli Censorship of the Palestinian Press". Journal of Palestine Studies. 13 (1): 93–101. doi:10.2307/2536927. JSTOR 2536927.
- Glock, Albert (Spring 1994). "Archaeology as Cultural Survival: The Future of the Palestinian Past". Journal of Palestine Studies. 23 (3): 70–84. doi:10.2307/2537961. JSTOR 2537961.
- Greenberg, Raphael; Keinan, Adi (2009). Israeli Archaeological Activity in the West Bank 1967–2007: A Sourcebook (PDF). Ostracon. ISBN 978-965-91468-0-2.
- Al-Houdalieh, Salah Hussein A.; Tawafsha, Saleh Ali (March 2017). "The Destruction of Archaeological Resources in the Palestinian Territories, Area C: Kafr Shiyān as a Case Study". Near Eastern Archaeology. 80 (1): 40–49. doi:10.5615/neareastarch.80.1.0040. JSTOR 10.5615/neareastarch.80.1.0040. S2CID 164811697.
- Joffe, Alexander H. (2005). "Book Reviews: Facts on the Ground". Journal of Near Eastern Studies. 64 (4): 297–304. doi:10.1086/498368.
- Kletter, Raz (2014). Just Past?: The Making of Israeli Archaeology. Routledge. ISBN 978-1-317-49136-1.
- Macintyre, Donald (14 June 2008). "Palestinians barred from Dead Sea beaches to 'appease Israeli settlers'". The Independent.
- Perugini, Nicola (Spring 2014). "The Moral Economy of Settler Colonialism: Israel and the "Evacuation Trauma"" (PDF). History of the Present. 4 (1): 49–74. doi:10.5406/historypresent.4.1.0049. hdl:20.500.11820/f4047a5e-f019-4992-ae9a-4619205d79b8. JSTOR 10.5406/historypresent.4.1.0049.
- Schipper, Friedrich T. (2013). "Holy Places: Contested Heritrage - Dealing with Cultural Heritage in the Region of Palestine from the Ottoman period until Today". In Kila, Joris D.; Zeidler, James (eds.). Cultural Heritage in the Crosshairs. Brill. pp. 263–286. ISBN 978-9-004-25142-7.
- Sher, Gilead (2006). The Israeli-Palestinian peace negotiations, 1999-2001 : within reach. London: Routledge. p. 165. ISBN 0-7146-5653-4. OCLC 60589065.
- Yahya, Adel H (2010). "Heritage Appropriation in the Holy Land". In Boytner, Ran; Dodd, Lynn Swartz; Parker, Bradley J. (eds.). Controlling the Past, Owning the Future: The Political Uses of Archaeology in the Middle East. University of Arizona Press. pp. 142–158. ISBN 978-0-816-52795-3.
- Yadin, Yigal (1966). Masada: Herod's Fortress and the Zealots' Last Stand. London: Weidenfeld. pp. 272. ISBN 978-0-297-74754-3.
- Yücel, Idris (2017). "The British School of Archaeology in Jerusalem in the wake of the WWI". History Studies. 9 (2): 257–269.
