= Raphael Falk (geneticist) =

German-born Israeli geneticist and historian (1929–2019)

Raphael "Rafi" Falk (Hebrew: רפאל "רפי" פאלק; July 14, 1929 – September 15, 2019) was a German-born Israeli geneticist and historian of science. He was professor emeritus of genetics at the Hebrew University of Jerusalem. His early research was on the genetics of Drosophila; from 1983 he was active in researching the history and philosophy of science, with a particular focus on genetics.

== Early life ==
Falk was born in Frankfurt am Main, Germany. When he was aged 5, amid the rise of Nazism in Germany, his family left for Palestine.

== Education and career ==
He was educated at the Stockholm University, where he worked with Gert Bonnier, and the Hebrew University of Jerusalem. He subsequently completed his postdoc with H. J. Muller and Curt Stern. His former teacher, Elisabeth Goldschmidt, eventually persuaded him to switch his research focus from Drosophila genetics to the history and philosophy of genetics as it pertains to the people of Israel. By the 1950s and 60s, his work appreciated the ways in which X-rays induced mutations in the flies in a way that Muller's original work in the 1920s had not.

From the early 1980s, Falk increasingly turned his attention to the history and philosophy of biology, becoming "one of the leading practitioners of the field". He also began to look at the interactions between studies on the population genetics of Jews and Zionist agendas, and ultimately published his body of research on the subject first in Hebrew in 2006 and in English in 2017 as Zionism and the Biology of the Jews.

== Personal life ==
He was married to psychologist and probability theorist Ruma Falk.

== Books ==
Falk's books include:

- The Concept of the Gene in Development and Evolution: Historical and Epistemological (edited with Peter J. Beurton and Hans-Jörg Rheinberger, Cambridge, University Press, 2000)
- Genetic Analysis: A History of Genetic Thinking (Cambridge University Press, 2011)
- Zionism and the Biology of Jews (Springer, 2017), English translation from the Hebrew: הציונות והביולוגיה של היהודים (Ressling, 2006)
