= Maurice Fishberg =

Jewish-American physical anthropologist

Maurice Fishberg (August 16, 1872 – August 30, 1934) was a Jewish-American physical anthropologist who specialised in the ethnology of the Jews. Fishberg was born in Kamenetz Podolsky (now Ukraine) and died in New York City.

== Involvement in the American Eugenics Movement and Self-Discreditation ==
After emigrating to the United States in 1889, and, arriving in New York, he studied medicine at the university there. He received his degree from New York University in 1897. He also studied at Bellevue Hospital Medical College.

Fishberg has been associated with Beth Israel Hospital, New York, and was medical examiner of the United Hebrew Charities of that city. During his time as a medical examiner he recorded skull and nose measurements of Jewish immigrants through which he originally asserted a genetic difference between Jews and non-Jews to describe them as another race along with Joseph Jacobs. However, his theories were largely discredited by Franz Boas through the application of the scientific method.

Opposed to the narrow or vertically arranged studies which Maurice Fishberg conducted which completely ignored the Jewish ethnicity, i.e. culture, religion, and even family in the case of adoptions, Franz Boas looked at all of those factors as well as across multiple generations and in multiple geographic locations to determine there to be no discernible genetic difference between Jews and non-Jews. This, combined with the growth of what Max J. Kholer called Hitlerism or later Nazism in Germany, resulted in a national summit where Boas presided as guest of honor. As Maurice Fishberg along with Ellsworth Huntington discredited their prior works before The Judeans and the Jewish Academy of Sciences on March 4, 1934, Boas emphatically stated that there is no genetic difference between Jew and non-Jew nor any "superior race". Later this discussion was distributed by Congregation B'nai B'rith in Cincinnati, Ohio.

== Tuberculosis ==
He wrote a book describing the "etiology, diagnosis, prognosis and treatment" of pulmonary tuberculosis. He critiqued the standard practice of treating tuberculosis in sanatoriums, and argued that treatment at home could be equally effective.

The book also claimed that people with tuberculosis are more likely to be talented at artistic temperaments, a common belief at the time.

== Works ==
- Physical Anthropology of the Jews (1902)
  - "Materials for the Physical Anthropology of the Eastern European Jews by Maurice Fishberg". Memoirs of the American Anthropological Society. Vol. I, 1905–1907. Lancaster, Pennsylvania: The New Era Printing Company. 1907. pp. 1–147.
- Jews: A Study of Race and Environment (1911)
- Pulmonary Tuberculosis (1919)
