= Jarrod Tanny =

American historian

Jarrod Tanny is a Canadian American professor of history and Charles and Hannah Block Distinguished Scholar in Jewish History at the University of North Carolina Wilmington. After completing his education through a master's degree in Canada, he came to the United States for a PhD in history at the University of California, Berkeley.

== Biography ==
Tanny grew up in Montreal, Canada, and graduated from McGill University. He earned a master's degree in Russian and East European studies from the University of Toronto, and a Ph.D. in history from the University of California at Berkeley in 2008.

== Career ==
Tanny, then a professor of history at Ohio University, was hired in 2010 as the inaugural Block Scholar, a professorship named in honour of the parents of former State Senator Frank Block (American politician). His scholarly interests include Jewish humour and Russian Jewish history.

Tanny's 2011 book, City of Rogues and Schnorrers, explores Jewish life in 19th-century Odesa, Ukraine (then part of the Russian Empire), a free port and boomtown with a reputation for attracting "gangsters and swindlers..." along with ambitious men and women, some of whom attained great wealth.

The Slavic and East European Journal, described City of Rogues and Schnorrers as, "serious and funny, informative and amusing, witty and well written." Reviewer Anna Shternshis cited Tanny's unusual ability to draw on both Russian and Yiddish sources, which she considers to be an important contribution in a field where scholarship has often been confined to a single language.

== Publications ==
- City of Rogues and Schnorrers: Russia's Jews and the Myth of Old Odesa. (Indiana University Press, 2011)
- "I Survived Teaching Jewish Studies in North Carolina" (Forward, March 22, 2015). Also published under the pseudonym Yid In Dixieland as "Bible Belt Blues: Tales of a Professional Canadian Jew in the American Deep South" (Shtetl Montreal, 2011).
- How To Boycott Israel For Dummies - New Campus Apartheid Edition. (Self-published)
- Jewish + Woke = Joke. (Self-published)
- The Gospel of Sarsour. (Self-published)
