= Khazar hypothesis of Ashkenazi ancestry =

Largely abandoned fringe theory on Ashkenazi descent

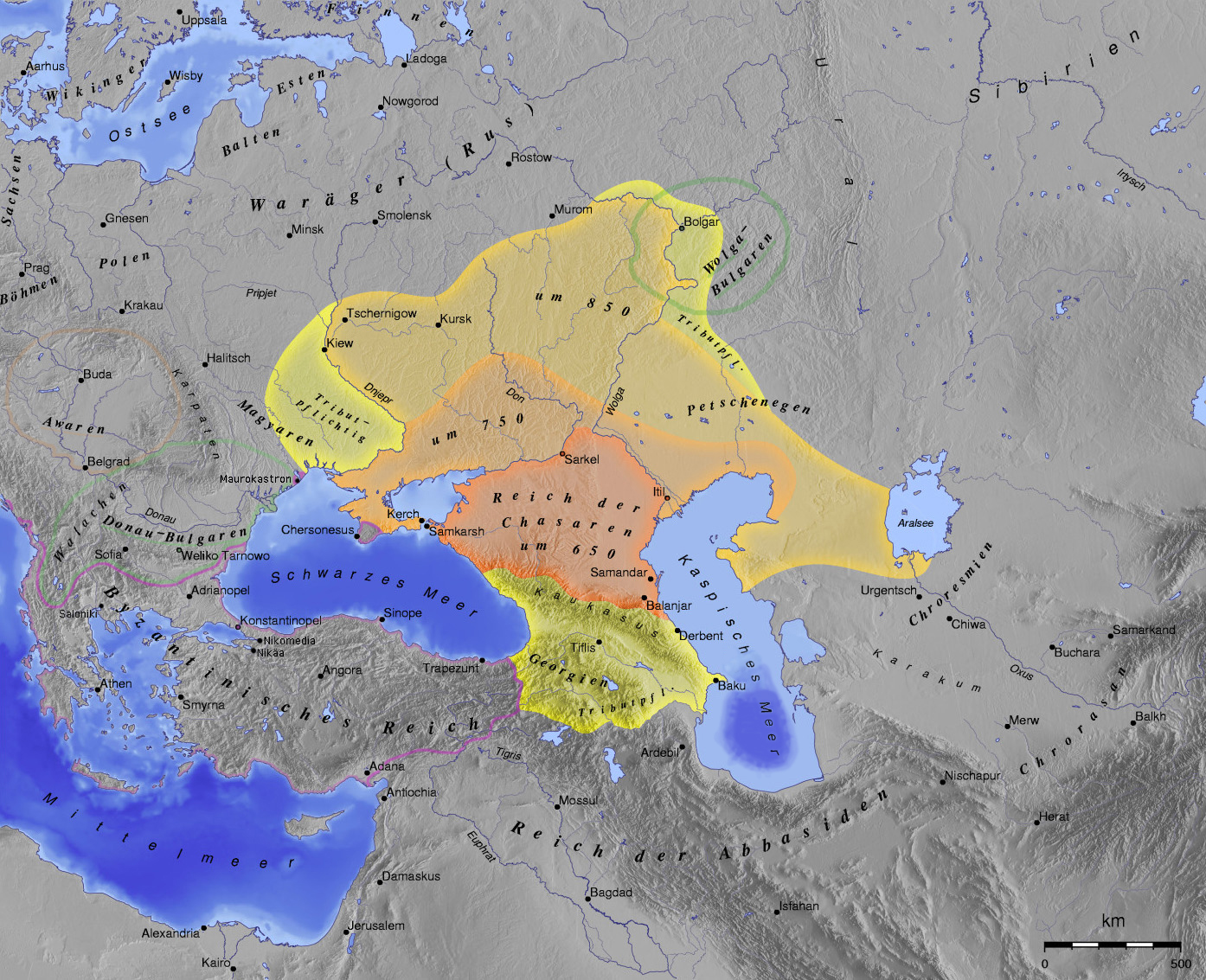
Khazar Khaganate, 650–850

A largely abandoned fringe hypothesis postulated that Ashkenazi Jews were primarily, or to a large extent, descended from converts to Judaism among the Khazars, a multi-ethnic conglomerate of mostly Turkic peoples who formed a semi-nomadic khanate in and around the northern and central Caucasus and the Pontic–Caspian steppe in the late 6th century CE. It is still sometimes used in antisemitic conspiracy theories and in various anti-Zionist approaches.

Genetic studies on Jews have found no substantive evidence of a Khazar origin among Ashkenazi Jews.

A 2023 American Society of Human Genetics Annual Meeting poster presentation reported that the Khazar myth of Ashkenazi Jewish origins had been "set to rest" and disproved, identifying a Western Turkic genetic profile in genomes from the core area of the Khazar Khaganate — and "no evidence at all" of recent shared ancestry with medieval or present-day Jewry.

Virtually all contemporary historians and linguists reject any notion of Khazars directly contributing to the ancestry of Ashkenazi Jewry, per the conclusions of population genomics researcher Pavel Flegontov et al. in 2016.

Genetic studies, the researchers also concluded, support a Near Eastern origin for a significant portion of Ashkenazi Y chromosomes and the traditional view of the European Jewish diaspora's Levantine origin — followed by migration to the northern Mediterranean, substantial local admixture especially on the maternal side, and subsequent limited Eastern European admixture, with no evidence of a detectable Khazar genetic contribution and no particular similarity to populations from the Caucasus, including populations in the Khazar region, among Ashkenazi Jews.

The Flegontov co-authors further cited Shaul Stampfer's 2013 historical analysis that the Khazars' conversion to Judaism might have never happened, "being a medieval legend".

Geneticists such as Doron Behar and others (2013) have concluded that an Ashkenazi-Khazar origin link is unlikely, and added that while the lack of clear modern descendants of the Khazars made it difficult to test any hypothetical contribution to Ashkenazi Jewish ancestry, the researchers found no genetic markers in Ashkenazi Jews that linked them to peoples of the Caucasus and Khazar area. Gil Atzmon et al. found evidence that the Ashkenazi have mixed Near Eastern and Southern European/Mediterranean origins, though some admixture with Khazar and Slavic populations after 100 CE was not excluded. Xue et al. note a wholly Khazar/Turkish/Middle Eastern origin is out of the question, given the complexity of Ashkenazi admixtures.

The medieval sources upon which the hypothesis drew, regarding the Khazar conversion "legend" discussed by Stampfer, included the Khazar Correspondence, according to which at some point in the 8th–9th centuries, a small number of Khazars were said by Judah Halevi and Abraham ibn Daud to have converted to Rabbinic Judaism, and after collapse of the Khazar empire, the Khazars were said to have fled to Eastern Europe to make up a large part of the Jews there. The scope of the conversion within the Khazar Khanate remains uncertain, and content used to tie the subsequent Ashkenazi communities to the Khazars is meager and subject to conflicting interpretations.

The myth of Europe's Jewish population originating among the Khazars persisted for two centuries, possibly from 1808. In the late 19th century, Ernest Renan and others speculated that the Ashkenazi Jews of Europe originated among refugees who had migrated from the collapsed Khazarian Khanate westward into Europe. Though intermittently evoked by several scholars since that time, the Khazar-Ashkenazi hypothesis received an uptick in attention with the publication of Arthur Koestler's The Thirteenth Tribe in 1976.

The hypothesis was resuscitated by geneticist Eran Elhaik in 2013, with research and critiques by Behar, Flegontov, Shaus, and others challenging it in the same year and thereafter.

Some anti-Zionists have cited the Khazar hypothesis in an attempt to discredit the claim by modern Jews to the Land of Israel. The Khazar hypothesis is also sometimes cited in antisemitic arguments promoted by adherents of various movements and ideologies to express the belief that modern Jews are not true descendants of the Israelites.

== Genetics and the Khazar theory ==
The consensus in genetic research affirms that the genetic origins of Ashkenazi Jews bear no indication of a detectable contribution from Khazars, and that the world's Jewish populations (including Ashkenazim, North African Jews, and Sephardim) share substantial genetic ancestry derived from a common ancient Middle Eastern founder population.

In a 2023 American Society of Human Genetics Annual Meeting poster presentation by Shaus, Shingiray, Lalueza-Fox, et al., multiple ancient genomes recovered from the core area of the Khazar Khaganate showed a typical Western Turkic genetic profile and "no evidence at all" for recent shared ancestry with present-day Jews or medieval Jews.

Earlier, ethnographer, historian, and anthropologist Raphael Patai also described the Khazars as a Turkic people. After major advances in DNA sequence analysis and computing technology in the late 20th and early 21st century, a plethora of genetic research on Jewish and other human populations has been conducted worldwide.

In 2000, science journalist Nicholas Wade interpreted a genetics paper on Ashkenazi Y-chromosome lineages as refuting theories that the Ashkenazi were descendants of converts generally or of the Khazars specifically.

The following year, in 2001, Almut Nebel et al., summarizing studies that reported a low-level European gene flow contributing to Ashkenazi paternal gene pool, suggested this influence might be reflected in the Eu 19 chromosomes common in Eastern Europe, or otherwise, that Ashkenazim with this component might descend from Khazars, an hypothesis the authors found "attractive". (Note: They hypothesized that these chromosomes could reflect low-level gene flow from surrounding Eastern European populations, or, alternatively, that both the Ashkenazi Jews with R1a1a (R-M17), and to a much greater extent Eastern European populations in general, might partly be descendants of Khazars. They concluded "However, if the R1a1a (R-M17) chromosomes in Ashkenazi Jews do indeed represent the vestiges of the mysterious Khazars then, according to our data, this contribution was limited to either a single founder or a few closely related men, and does not exceed ~12% of the present-day Ashkenazim.".)

In 2008, in a book entitled Jacob's Legacy: A Genetic View of Jewish History , David Goldstein stated that despite his initial skepticism regarding Koestler's thesis, the certainty underlying his dismissal had been undermined when he considered that a hypothetical Khazar connection struck him as no more far-fetched than what had emerged in genetics concerning the apparent 'spectacular continuity of the Cohen line' or the discovery of what seemed to be Jewish genetic signatures among the Bantu Lemba. In his view, the idea had a degree of plausibility, if not likely.

In 2013, Martin B. Richards stated that presently available genetic studies show that 50-80 percent of Ashkenazi Y chromosome DNA could be traced to the Near East, while his own study at the University of Huddersfield found that 80 percent of Ashkenazi mitochondrial DNA could be traced to Europe, but with virtually no lineages from the North Caucasus. This implied a trend of European women marrying Near Eastern men, but provided no evidence to support the Khazar hypothesis. The claim that Ashkenazis as a whole take their origin from Khazars has been widely criticized as there is no direct evidence to support it. Using four Jewish groups, one being Ashkenazi, Kopelman et al. found no evidence for the Khazar theory.

Some evidence suggests a close relationship of Jewish patrilineages (including those of the Ashkenazi, Sephardi, Iraqi and Moroccan Jews) with those of the Samaritans, with some lineages sharing a common ancestry projected to the time of the Assyrian conquest of the Kingdom of Israel.

=== Behar et al. studies ===
According to a 2010 study by Doron Behar et al., Ashkenazi Jews form a "tight cluster" overlying non-Jewish samples from the Levant with Sephardic, Middle Eastern and North African Jewish populations and Samaritans, results being "consistent with an historical formulation of the Jewish people as descending from ancient Hebrew and Israelite residents of the Levant". In 2013 Behar et al. published a genetic study that came up with the conclusion that there isn't genetic evidence for the Khazar origin of Ashkenazi Jews, and instead Ashkenazi Jews are genetically closest to other Jewish groups and non-Jewish Middle Eastern and European populations.

A 2003 study by Behar et al. found that Haplogroup R1a1a (R-M17) is present in over 50% of Ashkenazi Levites (who comprise 4% of the Ashkenazi Jewish population). In 2008 David Goldstein asserted that based on the study a Khazar connection "now seems to me plausible, if not likely". Faerman (2008) states that "External low-level gene flow of possible Eastern European origin has been shown in Ashkenazim but no evidence of a hypothetical Khazars' contribution to the Ashkenazi gene pool has ever been found."

However, Behar and others made two more genetic studies on Ashkenazi Levites ending up with a different conclusion. The results of these studies showed that the R1a haplogroup present in Ashkenazi Levites is R1a-M582/R1a-Y2619 rather than R1a1a and originated in the Near East instead of Eastern Europe and was "likely a minor haplogroup among the Hebrews".

A 2013 study by Rootsi, Behar et al. of Ashkenazi Levites found a high frequency of haplogroup R1a-M582 among them (64.9% of Ashkenazi Levites) pointing to a founding event and paternal ancestor common to half of them. Since R1a shows high frequency in Eastern Europe generally, it was thought possible, that the evidence might indicate the founder was a non-Jewish European. Testing the 3 hypotheses of a European, a Near Eastern or a Khazarian origin, their data excluded both the European and Khazarian origin of a Levite founder since they found no evidence of R1a-M582 Y-chromosomes in either group, other than singletons, while it occurs with significant frequency in Near Eastern regions Iranian Kerman, Iranian Azeri, the Kurds from Cilician Anatolia and Kazakhstan, and among Ashkenazi and non-Ashkenazi Jews. R1a-M582 was not detected among data from Iraqi, Bedouins, Druze and Palestinians sampled in Israel.

A 2017 study by Behar, concentrating on the Ashkenazi Levites (themselves about where the proportion reaches 50%), while signalling that there's a "rich variation of haplogroup R1a outside of Europe which is phylogenetically separate from the typically European R1a branches", precises that the particular R1a-Y2619 sub-clade testifies for a local origin, and that the "Middle Eastern origin of the Ashkenazi Levite lineage based on what was previously a relatively limited number of reported samples, can now be considered firmly validated."

=== Elhaik et al. studies ===
Eran Elhaik argued in 2012 that:

"Strong evidence for the Khazarian hypothesis is the clustering of European Jews with the populations that in his opinion resided on opposite ends of ancient Khazaria: Armenians, Georgians, and Azerbaijani Jews. Because Caucasus populations remained relatively isolated in the Caucasus region and because there are no records of Caucasus populations mass-migrating to Eastern and Central Europe prior to the fall of Khazaria (Balanovsky et al. 2011), these findings imply a shared origin for European Jews and Caucasus populations."

In later publications, Elhaik and his team modified their theory, proposing simply that the Judaised Khazar kingdom was a core transit area for a federation of Jewish merchants of mixed Iranian, Turkish and Slavic origins who, when that empire collapsed, relocated to Europe.

Furthermore, in the 2016 study Das, Elhaik, Wexler et al. argued that the first Ashkenazi populations to speak the Yiddish language came from areas near four villages in Eastern Turkey along the Silk Road whose names derived from the word "Ashkenaz," rather than from Germanic lands as is the general consensus in scholarship. They proposed that Iranians, Greeks, Turks, and Slavs converted to Judaism in Anatolia prior to migrating to Khazaria where a small-scale conversion had already occurred. The historian Bernard Spolsky commenting on Elhaik's earlier study wrote. "Recently, Elhaik (2013) claims to have found evidence supporting the Khazarian origin of Ashkenazim, but the whole issue of genetic evidence remains uncertain."

In 2018, Elhaik stated that the Ashkenazi maternal line is European and that only 3% of Ashkenazi DNA shows links with the Eastern Mediterranean/Middle East, a 'minuscule' amount comparable to the proportion of Neanderthal genes in modern European populations. For Elhaik, the vehicle by which unique Asiatic variations on Ashkenazi Y-chromosomes occurred, with Haplogroup Q-L275, was the Ashina ruling clan of the Göktürks, who converted to Judaism and established the Khazar empire.

==== Scientific criticism of papers by Elhaik, Das, and Wexler ====
Elhaik's 2012 study proved highly controversial. Several noted geneticists, among them Marcus Feldman, Harry Ostrer, Doron Behar, and Michael Hammer have maintained—and the view has gained widespread support among scientists—that the worldwide Jewish population is related and shares common roots in the Middle East, Feldman stated Elhaik's statistical analysis would not pass muster with most scientists; Hammer affirmed it was an outlier minority view without scientific support. Elhaik in reply described the group as "liars" and "frauds", noting Ostrer would not share genetic data that might be used "to defame the Jewish people". Elhaik's PhD supervisor Dan Graur, likewise dismissed them as a "clique", and said Elhaik is "combative" which is what science itself is.

Elhaik's 2012 study was criticized in a 2013 paper in Human Biology for its use of Armenians and Azerbaijani Jews as proxies for Khazars and for using Bedouin and Jordanian Hashemites as a proxy for the Ancient Israelites. The former decision was criticized because Armenians were assumed to have a monolithic Caucasian ancestry, when as an Anatolian people (rather than Turkic) they contain many genetically Middle Eastern elements. Azerbaijani Jews are also assumed for the purposes of the study to have Khazarian ancestry, when Mountain Jews are actually descended from Persian Jews. The decision to cast Bedouin/Hashemites as "proto-Jews" was especially seen as political in nature, considering that both have origins in Arab tribes from the Arabian Peninsula rather than from the Ancient Israelites, while the descent of the Jews from the Israelites is largely accepted.

Geneticists conducting studies in Jewish genetics have challenged Elhaik's methods in his first paper. Michael Hammer called Elhaik's premise "unrealistic," calling Elhaik and other Khazarian hypothesis proponents "outlier folks … who have a minority view that's not supported scientifically. I think the arguments they make are pretty weak and stretching what we know." Marcus Feldman, director of Stanford University's Morrison Institute for Population and Resource Studies, echoes Hammer. "If you take all of the careful genetic population analysis that has been done over the last 15 years … there's no doubt about the common Middle Eastern origin," he said. He added that Elhaik's first paper "is sort of a one-off." Elhaik's statistical analysis would not pass muster with most contemporary scholars, Feldman said: "He appears to be applying the statistics in a way that gives him different results from what everybody else has obtained from essentially similar data."

Das, Elhaik and Wexler's 2016 study was challenged by the historian of Soviet and East European Jewry Shaul Stampfer, who dismissed it as 'basically nonsense', and the demographer Sergio DellaPergola, who claimed it was a "falsification", whose methodology was defective in using a small population size and failing to factor in the genetic profiles of other Jews such as the Sephardic Jews to whom the Ashkenazi Jews are closely related. Elhaik replied that factoring in the DNA of non-Ashkenazic Jews would not alter the genetic profile of Ashkenazi Jews, and that his team remained the largest genomic study of the latter to date, and the first to target Yiddish speakers. The Yiddish scholar Marion Aptroot states "Seen from the standpoint of the humanities, certain aspects of the article by Das et al. fall short of established standards."

Recently, a study by a team of biologists and linguists, led by Pavel Flegontov, a specialist in genomics, published a response to Das, Elhaik and Wexler's 2016 study, criticizing their methodology and conclusions. They argue that GPS works to allow inferences for the origins of modern populations with an unadmixed genome, but not for tracing ancestries back 1,000 years ago. In their view, the paper tried to fit Wexler's 'marginal and unsupported interpretation' of Yiddish into a model that only permits valid deductions for recent unadmixed populations. They also criticized the linguistic aspect of the study on the grounds that "all methods of historical linguistics concur that Yiddish is a Germanic language, with no reliable evidence for Slavic, Iranian, or Turkic substrata." They further describe the purported "Slavo-Iranian confederation" as "a historically meaningless term invented by the authors under review."

Alexander Beider also takes issue with Elhaik's findings on linguistic grounds, similarly arguing that Yiddish onomastics lacks traces of a Turkic component. He concludes that theories of a Khazar connection are either speculative or simply wrong and "cannot be taken seriously."

== History ==
=== 1806–1918 ===
Lawrence J. Epstein attributes to the Ukrainian Rabbi Isaac Baer Levinsohn (1788–1860) the first reference of a connection between the Ashkenazi Jews and the Khazars. According to Jacob S. Raisin, Levinsohn expressed the opinion that Russian Jews hailed from the banks of the Volga. Levinsohn wrote in 1828:

Our elders told us that some generations earlier the Jews in these parts spoke only this Russian language, and this Ashkenazi Jewish language we speak now had not yet spread among all the Jews living in these regions. (Note: Direct citation from Levinsohn's Teudah beyisrael (Document in Israel): "Wexler 1987 p.230 believes that the Jewish Slavic varieties were replaced by Yiddish starting in the fourteenth century, and in the southern Slavic area by Judezmo starting in the sixteenth century: the process was slow, with the last evidence of monolingual Slavic–speaking Jews, in the early nineteenth century in the Ukraine. The latest reference reports (Levinsohn 1928:35) '(O)ur elders have told us that several generations ago, the Jews in these parts spoke only the Russian language'."(Spolsky 2014, p. 293, n.3))

The hypothesis was advanced nonetheless earlier, in 1808, by Johann Ewers in his Vom Ursprung des russischen Staats ("On the origins of the Russian state") in the context of an early controversy over the foundations of the Russian state, which pitted scholars espousing a Norman origin for the Varangians against those who argued that these founders of the Kievan Rus' were Slavic and indigenous. Ewers proposed the idea that the Viking/Varangian founders were in fact Khazars. The Russian historian Nikolay Karamzin advanced the claim, asserting that considerable numbers of Khazars had left Khazaria for Kievan Rus' in the time of Vladimir I (980–1015). The German Orientalist Karl Neumann suggested as early as 1847 that the migration of Khazars might have contributed to the formation of the core population of the Jews of Eastern Europe, without however specifying whether he was referring to Judaizing Turks or ethnic Jewish residents of Khazaria.

Subsequently, Abraham Eliyahu Harkavi suggested in 1869 that there might be a link between the Khazars and European Jews. Three years later, however, in 1872, a Crimean Karaite, Abraham Firkovich, alternatively proclaimed that the members of his Turkic-speaking sect were descended from Turkic converts to Judaism. This hypothesis, that the descendants of Khazar converts to Judaism formed a major proportion of Ashkenazim, was first proposed to a Western public by Ernest Renan in 1883. In a lecture delivered in Paris before the Saint-Simon Foundation on 27 January 1883, Renan argued that conversion played a significant role in the formation of the Jewish people, stating that:

This conversion of the kingdom of the Khazars has a considerable importance regarding the origin of those Jews who dwell in the countries along the Danube and southern Russia. These regions enclose great masses of Jewish populations which have in all probability nothing or almost nothing that is anthropologically Jewish in them.

According to Mari Réthelyi, a Jewish studies teacher writing in the journal Hungarian Cultural Studies, many Hungarian Jews in the late nineteenth century, responding to Magyarization and to Hungarian antisemitism, took up the theory, proposed by Rabbi Samuel Kohn in 1884, that Hungarian Jews, like Hungarian Christians, shared a common ethnic descent from the intermarriage of Khazars and Magyars.

Renan's thesis found an echo soon after, in 1885, when Isidore Loeb, a rabbi, historian and secretary of the Alliance Israélite Universelle, arguing for the cause of Jewish emancipation, challenged the notion that nations were based on races, and the Jews therefore, could be excluded as alien. To the contrary, he argued, they were no different from other peoples and nations, all of which arose from miscegenation: the Jews were no exception, and one could assume, he added, that many German and Russian Jews descended from the Khazars. (Note: Isidore Loeb (1893). "Réflexions sur les Juifs". Revue des Études Juives 27. pp. 1–31. This was published posthumously.) Similarly, in 1893, Anatole Leroy-Beaulieu, a critic of antisemitism who drew on Renan, queried whether or not thousands of Polish and Russian Jews might have their origins traced back to the "old nomads of the steppes". (Note: "N'est il pas probable que, parmi les quatre millions de juifs russes, il y en a des milliers qui se rattachent aux anciens nomades de la steppe? L'étude des types israélites en Pologne et en Petite-Russie porte à le croire. 11 semble qu'il y ait souvent chez eux un alliage finno-turc."(Leroy-Beaulieu 1893, pp. 124–125, 137–138))

Other scholars, such as Joseph Jacobs (1886), expressed scepticism. (Note: "In South Russia the kingdom of the Cozars, situated midway between the Patriarchate of Constantinople and the Emirate of Bagdad, ingeniously evaded the necessity of acknowledging either of these powers by formally adopting Judaism, which both had to tolerate. The adhesion was scarcely more than formal, and there is little evidence of any great intermixture of pure Jews with these Cozars, except by the few learned Jews who taught them their creed. These seem to have been of the Karaite sect, and we find still the headcentre of the Karaites in the Crimea, where the Cozars ultimately concentrated. All accounts represent the Karaites as perfectly un-Jewish in appearance, and I would venture to apply to them Napoleon's witticism, 'Grattez le Karaite et vous trouverez le Khazar' [Scratch a Karaite and you find a Khazar]. The Cozars were crushed in the ninth century, while the Polish Jews, who are supposed to show signs of intermixture with Cozars, came into that kingdom from Germany long afterwards."(Jacobs 1886, pp. 42–43))

The Russian-Jewish physician and physical anthropologist Samuel Weissenberg (1867–1928), using physical measurements of 1,350 Jews in his home town of Elizavetgrad, challenged the idea that east European Jews originated, like German Jews, as migrants from medieval France. Jewish settlement in eastern Europe took place very early, and these rooted eastern communities readily accepted into their midst Khazars who had converted, absorbing many thousands into the Kievan empire. The theory implied Jewish culture predated the rise of Russia, an implication which led Stalin decades later to ban Khazar studies in the Soviet Union. Johann Friedrich Blumenbach (1752–1840), a pioneer of race science and physical anthropology, had argued earlier that the origins of the "European" race lay in the Caucasus. In this context, Weissenberg's formulation, in identifying Eastern Jews as descendants of an intermixture of Jews with the Caucasian Khazars, presented the eastern Jews, long thought inferior or less noble than Western Sephardic Jews, as the authentic, veritable heirs of a European Jewish tradition. (Note: Goldstein 2006, p. 131: "The theory that Eastern European Jews descended from the Khazars was originally proposed by Samuel Weissenberg in an attempt to show that Jews were deeply rooted on Russian soil and that the cradle of Jewish civilization was the Caucasus.") In 1903, Maksymilian Ernest Gumplowicz (1864–1897), in his posthumous treatise entitled The beginnings of Jewish religion in Poland, examined traces of Khazar elements in early Polish history. (Note: Maksymilian Ernest Gumplowicz (1903). Początki religii żydowskiej w Polsce. Warsaw: E. Wende. pp. 15–28.)

In 1909 Hugo von Kutschera developed the notion into a book-length study, arguing that Khazars formed the foundational core of the modern Ashkenazi. Maurice Fishberg introduced the notion to an American audience in 1911 in his book The Jews: A Study of Race and Environment.

When at the Versailles Peace Conference, a Jewish Zionist called Palestine the land of the Jewish people's ancestors, Joseph Reinach, a French Jewish member of parliament who was opposed to Zionism, dismissed the idea, arguing that Jews descended from Israelites were a tiny minority. In his view, conversion had played a major role in the expansion of the Jewish people, and, in addition, he claimed, the majority of "Russian, Polish and Galician Jews descend from the Khazars, a Tatar people from the south of Russia who converted to Judaism en masse at the time of Charlemagne."

=== Interwar years, 1918–1939 ===
The idea was also taken up by the Polish-Jewish economic historian and General Zionist Yitzhak Schipper in 1918, by the Harvard anthropologist Roland B. Dixon (1923) and writer H. G. Wells (1921), who used it to argue that "The main part of Jewry never was in Judea", a thesis that was to have a political echo in later opinion. In 1931 Sigmund Freud wrote to Max Eitingon that the sculptor Oscar Nemon, for whom he was sitting, showed the lineaments of a "Slavic Eastern Jew, Khazar or Kalmuck or something like that".

In 1932, Samuel Krauss ventured the theory that the biblical Ashkenaz referred to northern Asia Minor, and he identified it with the Khazars, a position immediately disputed by Jacob Mann.

This interwar period consolidated also a belief, originally developed by the Russian Orientalists V. V. Grigor'iev and V. D. Smirnov, that the East European congregations of the Karaite sect of Judaism were descendants of Turkic Khazars. The idea of a Khazarian origin of the Karaites was then adopted as their official viewpoint. Seraja Szapszal (1873–1961), from 1927, the ḥakham of the Polish-Lithuanian Karaite community, had begun to implement a thorough-going reform policy of dejudaizing Karaite culture and traditions and transforming along Turkic lines. As a secular Jew and orientalist he was influenced by Atatürk's reforms, and his policy was dictated by several considerations: Jews were suffering from harassment in public and private in Eastern Europe; he wished to forestall the threat he had intuited was imminent in both Fascism and Nazism, which were beginning to gain a foothold; he was passionate about the Karaites' language, Karaim, and its Turkish tradition, and somewhat insouciant of the Judaic heritage of his people. In 1934 Corrado Gini, a distinguished statistician, interested also in demography and anthropology, with close ties to the fascist elite, led an expedition in August–October 1934 to survey the Karaites. He concluded that Karaites were ethnically mixed, predominantly Chuvash, which he mistook to be Finno-Ugric descendants of the Tauro-Cimmerians who at one point had been absorbed into the Khazars who for Gini however were not Turkic. A further conclusion was that the Ashkenazi arose from "Turko-Tatar converts to Judaism". Though the Khazar-Karaite theory is unsubstantiated by any historical evidence, the early Karaite literature speaks of Khazars as mamzerim, 'bastards' or 'strangers' within Judaism. This myth served a political purpose, of taking that community out of the stranglehold of antisemitic regulations and prejudices directed generally against Jews in Eastern Europe.

=== 1939–1945 ===
In 1943, Abraham Polak (sometimes referred to as Poliak), later professor of the history of the Middle Ages at Tel Aviv University, published a Hebrew monograph in which he concluded that the East European Jews came from Khazaria. First written as an article in 1941, then as a monograph (1943), it was twice revised in 1944, and then in 1951 with the title Khazaria: History of a Jewish Kingdom in Europe. (Note: Kazariyah: Toldot mamlacha yehudit be'Eropa, Tel Aviv: Mosad Bialik, 1951)

In Nazi Germany, unlike most race theorists in Germany down to his time, Hans F. K. Günther argued that the Jews were not a pure race, although he nevertheless considered them to be highly inbred. He argued that the Ashkenazi were a mix of Near Eastern, Oriental, East Baltic, Eastern, Inner-Asian, Nordic, Hamite, and Negro peoples and separate from the Sephardim. Günther believed that the conversion of the Khazars, whom he took to have been a Near Eastern race, constituted a further external element in the racial makeup of the Ashkenazi Jews, strengthening its Near Eastern component. Günther's theorizing about racial consequences flowing from the conversion of the Khazars was embraced by Gerhard Kittel.

The Karaite claim not to be ethnic Jews, but descendants of the Khazars, was eventually accepted by the Nazis who exempted them, unlike the Crimean Krymchaks with whom they had historic ties, from the policy of genocidal extermination on these grounds.

=== 1946–1949 ===
In debates leading up to the UN plan in 1947 to partition Palestine into Jewish and Arab states, the British politicians John Hope Simpson and Edward Spears, intent on denying Zionism that part of its claim that drew on biblical arguments, asserted that Jewish immigrants to Mandatory Palestine were the descendants of pagan converts and not of the Israelites. The approach was one shared by both gentile and Jewish anti-Zionists. Rory Miller claims that their denial of lineal descent from Israelites drew on the Khazar theory.

In anti-Zionist argumentation delivered at the UN in 1947 Faris al-Khoury and Jamal Al-Husseini used the theory to oppose the creation of a Jewish state on racial and historic grounds. Cecil Hourani claimed that the Arab leaders had been convinced of the value of the argument by Benjamin H. Freedman. Internal British documents seem to support the claim. It would later play a role in Arab anti-Zionist polemics, taking on an antisemitic edge, though Bernard Lewis, noted in 1987 that serious Arab scholars had dropped it, remarked that it only occasionally emerged in Arab political polemics.

=== 1950–1976 ===
D.M. Dunlop, writing in 1954, thought very little evidence backed what he regarded as a mere assumption, and argued that the Ashkenazi-Khazar descent hypothesis went far beyond what "our imperfect records" permit.

Léon Poliakov, while assuming the Jews of Western Europe resulted from a "panmixia" in the first millennium, on the basis of serology research showing their blood types overlapped with those of other European populations, asserted in 1955 that it was widely assumed that Europe's Eastern Jews descended from a mixture of Khazarian and German Jews. Polak's work found some support from Salo Wittmayer Baron and Ben-Zion Dinur, but was dismissed by Bernard Weinryb as a fiction (1962).

In 1957 Salo Wittmayer Baron, called by his biographer an "architect of Jewish history", devoted a large part of a chapter in his Social and Religious History of the Jews to the Khazarian Jewish state, and the impact he believed that community exercised on the formation of East European Jewries in his Social and Religious History of the Jews (1957). The scarcity of direct Jewish testimonies did not disconcert Baron: this was to be expected since medieval Jews were "generally inarticulate outside their main centers of learning". The Khazarian turn to Judaism was, he judged, the "largest and last mass conversion", involving both the royal house and large sectors of the population. Jews migrated there to flee the recurrent intolerance against Jews and the geopolitical upheavals of the region's chronic wars, which often proved devastating to northern Asia Minor, between Byzantium, Sassanid Persia, and the Abbasid and Umayyad Caliphates.

For Baron, the fact of Jewish Khazaria played a lively role in stirring up among Western Jews an image of "red Jews", and among Jews in Islamic countries a beacon of hope. After the dissolution of Khazaria, Baron sees a diaspora drifting both north into Russia, Poland and Ukraine, and westwards into Pannonia and the Balkans, where their cultivated presence both established Jewish communities and paved the way, ironically, for the Slavonic conversion to Christianity. By the 11th and 12th centuries, these Eastern Jews make their first appearance in the Jewish literature of France and Germany. Maimonides, bemoaning the neglect of learning in the East, laid his hopes for the perpetuation of Jewish learning in the young struggling communities of Europe but would, Baron concludes, have been surprised to find that within centuries precisely in Eastern Europe would arise thriving communities that were to assume leadership of the Jewish people itself.

=== 1976–present: Koestler, The Thirteenth Tribe and contemporary views ===
The Khazar-Ashkenazi hypothesis came to the attention of a much wider public with the publication in 1976 of Arthur Koestler's book The Thirteenth Tribe, which made sweeping claims for a Khazar legacy among the Ashkenazi, and asserted that the Jewish population in Eastern Europe could not have reached 8 million without the contribution of the Khazars. Koestler argued that the Khazar theory would mitigate European racially-based antisemitism.

The book received both positive and negative reviews. Israel's ambassador to Britain branded it "an anti-Semitic action financed by the Palestinians", while Bernard Lewis claimed that the idea was not supported by any evidence whatsoever, and had been "abandoned by all serious scholars".

Raphael Patai, however, registered some support for the idea that Khazar remnants had played a role in the growth of Eastern European Jewish communities, and several amateur researchers, such as Boris Altschüler (1994) and Kevin Alan Brook, kept the thesis in the public eye. Brook's views evolved as new data became available: in the first edition of his book (1999), he contended that about one-fourth of Ashkenazic ancestry may trace back to the Khazars, whereas in the second edition (2006) he regarded the Khazar contribution as "small" and in the third edition (2018) he argued against any Khazar contribution.

In 2007, Peter Golden suggested that at least some of the Ashkenazi Jews of Hungary in particular (along with some Hungarians) might have inherited a minority of their ancestry from Khazar remnants that migrated west.

The theory has been used in challenges to concepts of Jewish peoplehood. It has been revived recently in a variety of approaches, from linguistics (Paul Wexler) to historiography (Shlomo Sand in his 2008 book The Invention of the Jewish People) and population genetics (Eran Elhaik). In broad academic perspective, both the idea that the Khazars converted en masse to Judaism, and the suggestion that they emigrated to form the core population of Ashkenazi Jewry, remain highly polemical issues.

Writing in 2011, Simon Schama in his The Story of the Jews, endorsed the traditional narrative of a Khazar conversion under kings of distant Jewish descent who initiated judaising reforms among the population. In June 2014, Shaul Stampfer published a paper challenging the Khazar hypothesis as ungrounded in sources contemporary with the Khazar period, stating: "Such a conversion, even though it's a wonderful story, never happened".

== Antisemitism ==
=== United States ===
Maurice Fishberg and Roland B. Dixon's works were later exploited in racist and religious polemical literature by advocates of British Israelism in the United States. Particularly after the publication of Burton J. Hendrick's The Jews in America (1923) Singerman 2004, pp. 4–5 it began to enjoy a vogue among advocates of immigration restrictions in the 1920s; racial theorists like Lothrop Stoddard; antisemitic conspiracy theorists such as the Ku Klux Klan's Hiram Wesley Evans; and anti-communist polemicists such as John O. Beaty.

In 1938, Ezra Pound, then strongly identifying with the Fascist regime of Benito Mussolini, sent a query to fellow poet Louis Zukofsky concerning the Khazars after someone had written to him claiming that the ancient Jews had died out and that modern Jews were of Khazar descent. He returned to the issue in 1955, apparently influenced by a book called Facts Are Facts, which pushed the Jewish-Khazar descent theory, and which for Pound had dug up "a few savoury morsels". The booklet in question, by a Roman Catholic convert from Rabbinic Judaism, Benjamin H. Freedman, was an antisemitic tirade written to David Goldstein after the latter had converted to Catholicism.

John O. Beaty was an antisemitic, McCarthyite professor of Old English at SMU, author of The Iron Curtain over America (Dallas 1952). According to him, "the Khazar Jews were responsible for all of America's – and the world's ills," beginning with World War I. The book had little impact until the former Wall Street broker and oil tycoon J. Russell Maguire promoted it. A similar position was adopted by Wilmot Robertson, whose views influenced David Duke. British novelist Douglas Reed has also been influential. In his works, the Ashkenazi are false Jews, descendants of the Khazars.

A number of different variants of the theory came to be exploited by the Christian Identity movement, which took shape from the 1940s to the 1970s and had its roots in British Israelism planted on American evangelical soil in the late 19th century. By the 1960s the Khazar ancestry theory was an article of faith in the Christian Identity movement, which has associated two verses from the New Testament, Revelation 2:9 and 3:9 with the Khazars. Jeffrey Kaplan calls these two passages the cornerstone of Identity theology. He also reports that Christian Identity literature makes selective references to the Babylonian Talmud, while the works of Francis Parker Yockey and Arthur Koestler are raised almost to the status of Holy Writ.

Contemporary antisemitic groups have promoted the Khazar myth on social media, according to the Anti-Defamation League and the American Jewish Committee. In the United States, extremist sects of Black Hebrew Israelites promote the long-debunked antisemitic Khazar conspiracy theory about Jewish origins. These groups believe that Jewish people are "imposters" and that African Americans (sometimes Native and Latin Americans also) are the true descendants of the Israelites.

=== Soviet Union and Russia ===
The Khazar myth was prominent in Soviet antisemitism, gaining a place in Soviet historiography. The theory influenced Soviet historians including Boris Rybakov, Mikhail Artamonov and Lev Gumilyov and was used to support Soviet political theory. Artamonov argued that the Khazars had played an important role in the development of Rus'. Rybakov disputed this view, instead regarding the Khazar state as parasitic. Official Soviet views on the Khazars hardened after December 1951 when Pravda published a critical review of Artamonov's work under the pen name P. Ivanov. Rybakov for his part denied that he was Ivanov. (Sand has speculated that Ivanov was in fact Stalin.) According to Sand, in Ivanov's review the Khazars were regarded as parasites and enemies. Ivanov's views became the certified Soviet position.

Lev Gumilyov's theory of ethnogenesis draws heavily on the Khazars theory. For Gumilyov ethnicity was defined by stereotypical behavior which was linked to adaption to the terrain. He regarded Jews as a parasitic, international urban class. The Jews had dominated the Khazars creating a chimera, subjecting Rus' to the "Khazar Yoke".

Since the 1970s the term Khazars has entered the Russian nationalist lexicon, being used as a euphemism for Jews. Vadim V. Kozhinov theorized that the Khazar Yoke was more dangerous to Rus´ than the Tatar Yoke. The Khazars were imagined as a persistent danger to Rus'. After the dissolution of the Soviet Union the theory maintained a role in Russian antisemitism. Contemporary Russian antisemites continue to perpetuate the Khazar myth. Gumilyov's and his students' works remain popular in Russia. "Khazars" and "ethnic chimera" have become preferred terms for antisemitic Russian chauvinists.

=== Germany ===
The Khazar hypothesis was promoted by the former Nazi scholar Herman Wirth (1885–1981), who wrote an antisemitic legal report in 1958 that questioned the origins of the Jewish People and relativized the Holocaust. It was central to his Palestinabuch (Book of Palestine), the extensive manuscript of which was lost for unclear reasons in the 1970s. It was his theory that the Ashkenazi Jews descended from a superstitious slave people (Khazars) on the fringes of a mythical Nordic civilization (Shambhala) in the Gobi Desert. According to Wirth, Christ descended from a lost tribe of the original Aryans, who had left their traces in the Near East in the form of Megalithic monuments.

The Palestinabuch was meant as a counterpart to Wirth's Ura Linda Chronicle (1933) on the ancient Frisians, whom he considered direct descendants of the first Aryans and whose origins he located in Palestine. It was officially titled The Riddle of the Palestine's Megalithic Graves: From JAU to Jesus. By 1969 the proposed title had changed into Between the North Sea and the Sea of Genezareth, implicitly referring to an influential book by the 19th-century German reactionary Julius Langbehn.

The myth of the lost Palestinabuch was promoted by the Chilean fascist and antisemite Miguel Serrano and picked up by the Russian political theorist Alexandr Dugin, who devoted his indicative book Hyperborean Theory (1993) to Herman Wirth's legacy. Wirth's ideas were also echoed by the German conspiracy theorist Jan van Helsing, who wrote several influential books on secret societies, as well as by the New Age influencer David Icke.

=== Cults ===
Aum Shinrikyo is a Japanese doomsday cult. The cult was active in Japan and Russia, with an estimated 10,000 and 30,000 followers respectively. The group's Manual of Fear used The Protocols of the Elders of Zion in addition to other antisemitic material. The manual claimed that the Jews are really Khazars intent on world domination. The Khazar theory has also become part of the Ascended Masters theology. Hatonn, an extraterrestrial, transmits messages including the complete text of The Protocols of the Elders of Zion. He identifies the authors of The Protocols as Khazars and speaks of false Zionist Jews who have usurped and controlled the true Jews.

== See also ==
- Wentworth Arthur Matthew
- Ernest Renan – French Orientalist and Semitic scholar
- Khazarian Mafia
- Genetic history of Europe
- History of the Jews in Turkey
- Japanese-Jewish common ancestry theory
- Japhetic theory
- Jewish ethnic divisions
- Jewish history
- Kuzari
- List of topics characterized as pseudoscience
- Rus' Khaganate
- Theory of Kashmiri descent from lost tribes of Israel
- Timeline of the Turkic peoples (500–1300)
