= The Thirteenth Tribe =

1976 book by Arthur Koestler

- First UK edition
- Author: Arthur Koestler
- Language: English
- Subject: Khazar Empire,Ashkenazi Jews,Jewish History
- Publisher: Hutchinson
- Publication date: 1976
- Publication place: United Kingdom
- Media type: Print
- Pages: 244 (1977 Pan Books edition)
- ISBN: 0-394-40284-7

The Thirteenth Tribe is a 1976 book by Arthur Koestler advocating the Khazar hypothesis of Ashkenazi ancestry, the thesis that Ashkenazi Jews are not descended from the historical Judeans and Israelites of antiquity, but from Khazars, a Turkic people who allegedly mass-converted to Judaism. Koestler hypothesized that the Khazars after their conversion in the 8th century migrated westwards into Eastern Europe in the 12th and 13th centuries when the Khazar Empire was collapsing.

Koestler used previous works by Douglas Morton Dunlop, Raphael Patai and Abraham Polak as sources. His stated intent was to make antisemitism disappear by disproving its racial basis.

Popular reviews of the book were mixed, academic critiques of its research were generally negative, and Koestler biographers David Cesarani and Michael Scammell panned it. In 2018, the New York Times described the book as "widely discredited."

== Summary ==
=== Contents ===
Koestler advances the thesis that Ashkenazi Jews are not descended from the historical Israelites of antiquity, but from Khazars, a Turkic people originating in and populating an empire north of and between the Black Sea and Caspian Sea. Koestler's hypothesis is that the Khazars – who converted to Judaism in the 8th century – migrated westwards into current Eastern Europe (primarily Ukraine, Poland, Belarus, Lithuania, Hungary and Germany) in the 12th and 13th centuries when the Khazar Empire was collapsing.

At the end of the book's last chapter, Koestler summarizes its content and his intentions as follows: "In Part One of this book I have attempted to trace the history of the Khazar Empire based on the scant existing sources. In Part Two, Chapters V-VII, I have compiled the historical evidence which indicates that the bulk of Eastern Jewry — and hence of world Jewry — is of Khazar-Turkish, rather than Semitic, origin. In the last chapter I have tried to show that the evidence from anthropology concurs with history in refuting the popular belief in a Jewish race descended from the biblical tribe."

=== Sources ===
Mattias Gardell writes that Koestler's thesis is "partly based on amateur anthropology", and its scientific arguments come from The Myth of a Jewish Race (1975) by Raphael Patai and his daughter Jennifer. It also relies on the work of earlier historians, particularly Russian-Israeli historian Abraham Poliak's Hebrew book Khazaria: Toledot mamlakhah yehudit (1951), and the History of the Jewish Khazars (1954) by Douglas Morton Dunlop, the author whom Koestler himself describes as a main source. Neil McInnes writes that Dunlop was, however, "much more tentative" in his conclusions, as were other historians of Khazars, including Peter Golden and Moses Shulvass. Golden himself described the book as "controversial", stating it contained "sweeping claims of Khazar legacy and influence".

=== Motive ===
Koestler biographer Michael Scammell writes that Koestler told French biologist Pierre Debray-Ritzen he "was convinced that if he could prove that the bulk of Eastern European Jews (the ancestors of today's Ashkenazim) were descended from the Khazars, the racial basis for anti-Semitism would be removed and anti-Semitism itself could disappear". According to George Urban, Koestler's desire to connect Ashkenazi Jews with Khazars was "based on a tacit belief that the intellectual brilliance of and international influence of Hungarians and Jews, especially Hungarian Jews or Jewish-Hungarians, was due to some unexplained but clearly ancient affinity between the two peoples".

== Reception ==
In The Invention of the Jewish People, Shlomo Sand, historian of cinema, French intellectual history, and nationalism at Tel Aviv University, writes "while the Khazars scared off the Israeli historians, not one of whom has published a single paper on the subject, Koestler's Thirteenth Tribe annoyed and provoked angry responses. Hebrew readers had no access to the book itself for many years, learning about it only through the venomous denunciations". Writing in The Wall Street Journal, Chronicle of Higher Education editor Evan Goldstein states "Sand suggests that those who attacked Koestler's book did so not because it lacked merit, but because the critics were cowards and ideologues. 'No one wants to go looking under stones when venomous scorpions might be lurking beneath them, waiting to attack the self-image of the existing ethnos and its territorial ambitions.'"

In the Arab world the theory espoused in Koestler's book was adopted by persons who argued that if Ashkenazi Jews are primarily Khazar and not Semitic in origin, they would have no historical claim to Israel, nor would they be the subject of the Biblical promise of Canaan to the Israelites, thus undermining the theological basis of both Jewish religious Zionists and Christian Zionists. The Saudi Arabian delegate to the United Nations argued that Koestler's theory "negated Israel's right to exist". Koestler did not see alleged Khazar ancestry as diminishing the claim of Jews to Israel, which he felt was based on the United Nations mandate and not on Biblical covenants or genetic inheritance. In his view, "[t]he problem of the Khazar infusion a thousand years ago... is irrelevant to modern Israel."

Koestler's book was praised by the neo-Nazi magazine The Thunderbolt as "the political bombshell of the century", and it was enthusiastically supported by followers of the Christian Identity movement. According to Jeffrey Kaplan, The Thirteenth Tribe was "Identity's primary source for the Khazar theory"; they felt Koestler's book confirmed their own beliefs regarding Jews, and sold it "through their mail order services". Goldstein writes that "Koestler and the Khazar theory he advanced lives on in the fever swamps of the white nationalist movement". Michael Barkun writes that Koestler was apparently "either unaware of or oblivious to the use anti-Semites had made of the Khazar theory since its introduction at the turn of the century."

== Assessment ==
After it was first published, Fitzroy Maclean in The New York Times Book Review called The Thirteenth Tribe excellent, writing "Mr. Koestler's book is as readable as it is thought-provoking. Nothing could be more stimulating than the skill, elegance and erudition with which he marshals his facts and develops his theories." Reviewing the work in the Washington Report on Middle East Affairs in 1991, journalist and author Grace Halsell described it as a "carefully researched book" that "refutes the idea of a Jewish 'race'."

Despite some positive reviews in the press, James A. Beverley writes "When The Thirteenth Tribe was released, the academic critique of its research was prompt, public, and generally negative", and Evan Goldstein states that it was "savaged by critics". An August 1976 review in Time magazine described Koestler's theory as "all too facile, despite the obvious effort and time the author spent on his study", and stated that "Koestler offers a blizzard of information but not enough hard facts to support his thesis". A November 1976 review in National Review stated that the work had "neither the value of a well-executed honest piece of scholarship nor the emotional appeal of a polemic – only the earmarks of a poorly researched and hastily written book". Koestler's analysis was described as a mixture of flawed etymologies and misinterpreted primary sources by Chimen Abramsky in 1976 and Hyam Maccoby in 1977.

Barkun describes the book as an "eccentric work", and writes that Koestler was "unequipped with the specialist background the subject might be thought to require", but that he "nevertheless made an amateur's serious attempt to investigate and support the theory." Professor of Polish-Jewish history Gershon D. Hundert wrote in 2006 "There is no evidence to support the theory that the ancestors of Polish Jewry were Jews who came from the Crimean Jewish kingdom of Khazaria", describing Koestler as the "best-known advocate" of the theory. In 2009, Jeffrey Goldberg wrote that the book was "a combination of discredited and forgotten [ideas]".

Koestler biographers have also been critical of the work. In Arthur Koestler: The Homeless Mind (1998), David Cesarani states it makes "selective use of facts for a grossly polemical end" and is "risible as scholarship". In Koestler: The Literary and Political Odyssey of a Twentieth-Century Skeptic (2009), Michael Scammell writes that Koestler's theory "was almost entirely hypothetical and based on the slenderest of circumstantial evidence", and takes the book as evidence that Koestler's brain "was starting to fail him".

=== Genetic research ===
A 2005 study by Nebel et al., based on Y chromosome polymorphic markers, showed that Ashkenazi Jews are more closely related to other Jewish and Middle Eastern groups than to the populations among whom they lived in Europe. However, 11.5% of male Ashkenazim were found to belong to Haplogroup R1a, the dominant Y chromosome haplogroup in Eastern Europeans, suggesting possible gene flow. Referencing The Thirteenth Tribe, the study's authors note that "Some authors argue that after the fall of their kingdom in the second half of the 10th century CE, the Khazar converts were absorbed by the emerging Ashkenazi Jewish community in Eastern Europe." They conclude: "However, if the R-M17 chromosomes in Ashkenazi Jews do indeed represent the vestiges of the mysterious Khazars then, according to our data, this contribution was limited to either a single founder or a few closely related men, and does not exceed ~ 12% of the present-day Ashkenazim". Subsequent research showed that Ashkenazi varieties of R1a cannot have been Khazar in origin, with their Levite branch R1a-Y2619 within R1a-M582 being of Middle Eastern origin and their non-Levite haplogroup R1a-M12402 having close Slavic matches but a distance from Turkic matches.

Writing in Science, Michael Balter states Koestler's thesis "clash[es] with several recent studies suggesting that Jewishness, including the Ashkenazi version, has deep genetic roots." He refers to a 2010 study by geneticist Harry Ostrer which found that Ashkenazi Jews "clustered more closely with Middle Eastern and Sephardic Jews, a finding the researchers say is inconsistent with the Khazar hypothesis" and concludes "that all three Jewish groups—Middle Eastern, Sephardic, and Ashkenazi—share genomewide genetic markers that distinguish them from other worldwide populations". Geneticist Noah Rosenberg asserts that although recent DNA studies "do not appear to support" the Khazar hypothesis, they do not "entirely eliminate it either."

A 2013 study by Costa et al. included The Thirteenth Tribe in its list of references and attempted to test its Khazar hypothesis genetically. It concluded that "virtually none" of the Ashkenazi mitochondrial DNA (mtDNA) haplogroups originated in the North Caucasus or Chuvashia, which it viewed as invalidating Koestler's hypothesis.
