= Graur =

Graur is a surname. Notable people with the surname include:

- Alexandru Graur (1900–1988), Romanian linguist
- Dan Graur (born 1953), American scientist working in the fields of molecular evolution
- Dinu Graur (born 1994), Moldovan footballer
- Valeriu Graur (1940–2012), Moldovan activist and a political prisoner in the former Soviet Union
