= Khazar myth (disambiguation) =

Khazar myth may refer to:

- Khazar hypothesis of Ashkenazi ancestry
- Antisemitic theories associated with Khazars
- Khazar hypothesis of Cossack ancestry
- An element of Khazar mythology
