= Eran Elhaik =

Israeli geneticist and bioinformatician

- ערן אלחייק
- Born: 1980 (age 45–46); Israel
- Education: University of Houston
- Scientific career
- Fields: Genetics, bioinformatics, Population genetics
- Workplaces: Johns Hopkins University, University of Sheffield, Lund University
- Doctoral advisor: Dan Graur
- Website: www.eranelhaiklab.org

Eran Elhaik (Hebrew: ערן אלחייק; born 1980) is an Israeli-American geneticist and bioinformatician, an associate professor of bioinformatics at Lund University in Sweden and Chief of Science Officer at an ancestry testing company called Ancient DNA Hub owned by Anath Genomic Consultans AB, registered in Sweden. His research uses computational, statistical, epidemiological and mathematical approaches to fields such as complex disorders, population genetics, personalised medicine, molecular evolution, genomics, paleogenomics and epigenetics.

== Career ==
After completing undergraduate studies in Israel, he obtained a PhD in molecular evolution under the supervision of Dan Graur at the University of Houston in 2009, followed by postdoctoral research fellowships at the Johns Hopkins University School of Medicine and School of Public Health. In 2011, after concerns emerged about the retention of private genetic data of individuals in surveyed populations, the Genographic Project hired Elhaik and asked him to design a method that would enable analysts to extract only historical information from the accumulating genomic evidence of populations in order to ensure that the personal health data of sampled individuals remained private. From 2014 to 2019 he worked at the University of Sheffield Department of Animal and Plant Sciences in the United Kingdom. Since 2019 he has been an associate professor of bioinformatics at the Department of Biology at Lund University in Sweden.

== Research ==
In the field of molecular evolution, Elhaik worked on the compositional domain model that describes the compositional organization of animal genomes.

In the field of complex disorders, he proposed that the allostatic load theory could be used to explain bipolar disorder and Sudden infant death syndrome (SIDS). According to this theory, the accumulation of perinatal and prenatal stressors has neurotoxic effects with consequences to one's health.

In the field of genetics, Elhaik was part of the team that designed the GenoChip microarray for the Genographic Project and their online tests. He also contributed to the development of algorithms for data compression. in earlier ancestry studies, modern paternal or maternal haplogroups were used to trace migrations in antiquity. Elhaik was diffident about the method, considering it problematic 'since the modern frequencies of haplogroups do not represent the past very accurately.' To this end he developed his aGPS algorithm to establish place of origin with greater precision.

In the field of population genetics, Elhaik has published papers analyzing the ancestries of European Jews and Druze, including work related to the Khazar hypothesis of Ashkenazi ancestry, a contentious subject that has received media attention.

Elhaik acknowledges the presence of a Middle Eastern signature amongst Ashkenazi Jews, but he isn't certain if this suggests ancient Judean or Iranian ancestry. He has previously proposed that Ashkenazi Jews are of mixed Irano-Turko-Slavic and southern European descent. Most of Elhaik's population genetic research uses the GPS (Geographic Population Structure) algorithm designed by him and co-authors.

Elhaik himself initially contacted Harry Ostrer, who, along with most other scientists in the field, proposes that the Jews are genetically related and relatively homogeneous, to obtain permission to access the data basis used by Ostrer and his colleagues to establish their result. Ostrer was willing to share his data provided that Elhaik submit a proposal showing that the project met several criteria, including that it be "non-defamatory nature toward the Jewish people", which Elhaik claimed was evidence of bias.

Elhaik has indicated that it "bothers him" to see that his paper "has attracted the attention of anti-Zionists and 'anti-Semitic white supremacists'".

In the field of paleogenetics, Elhaik has published papers that identified ancient ancestry informative markers (aAIMs), which can be used for the biolocalization of ancient individuals He has also developed an AI-based method called Temporal Population Structure (TPS) to date ancient individuals from their DNA without prior knowledge.

In the field of forensics, Elhaik has published applications and legal papers. His applications include GPS that allows geolocations of human DNA and mGPS, an AI-based tool which employs the water, soil, and urban environment microbiome for geolocation and can be used forensically to complement or replace DNA and fingerprint evidence. Elhaik has also published a legal opinion on how privacy laws should be amended to accommodate advancements in metagenomics.

In terms of pure theory, Elhaik has published a critique of the methodology of PCA that undergirds the whole structure of population genetics. Re-analyzing 12 PCA applications he found that the method lends itself to generating desired outcomes, and is characterized by cherrypicking and circular reasoning. The design flexibility of PCA enables anyone to buttress preconceived claims about ethnogenesis. He illustrated the point by instancing the case of genetic studies of the origins of Ashkenazi Jews. This thesis was ranked 8th among the top 100 downloaded scientific papers published by Nature Portfolio in 2022.

== Reactions ==
The accuracy and reliability of Elhaik's population genetic theory of the Khazars met with strong criticism from a number of other geneticists, as well as from linguists who took exception to his use of Paul Wexler's theories of the origins of Yiddish.

In particular, the validity of the proxy population used in his first Khazar paper was criticized on methodological grounds. Marcus Feldman has said that Elhaik is "just wrong" about the Khazar hypothesis, where he "appears to be applying the statistics in a way that gives him different results from what everybody else has obtained from essentially similar data". Elhaik argues that ancestry of Jewish populations is poorly understood, and also that principal component analysis, employed to identify population structures and their ancestry, has serious flaws that generate erroneous results.

In a 2015 overview of the issue of attempts to derive an inclusive genetic profile of all Jews, Raphael Falk, touching on Elhaik's contribution to the argument in 2013, wrote:

The findings support the hypothesis that posits that European Jews are comprised of Caucasus, European, and Middle Eastern ancestries, and portray the European Jewish genome as a mosaic of Caucasus, European, and Semitic ancestries, thereby consolidating previous contradictory reports of Jewish ancestry.

Falk then noted the follow-up paper by Behar challenging Elhaik's results argued that the southern Caucasus populations, sampled by Elhaik were related to countries further south. The problem, he concluded, was that 'the risk of circularity of the argument is exposed: Geneticists determine the genotypic details of socio-ethnologists' classifications, whereas socio-demographers rely on geneticists findings to bolster their classifications.
