= Shlomo Sand =

Israeli historian and academic (born 1946)

- שלמה זנד
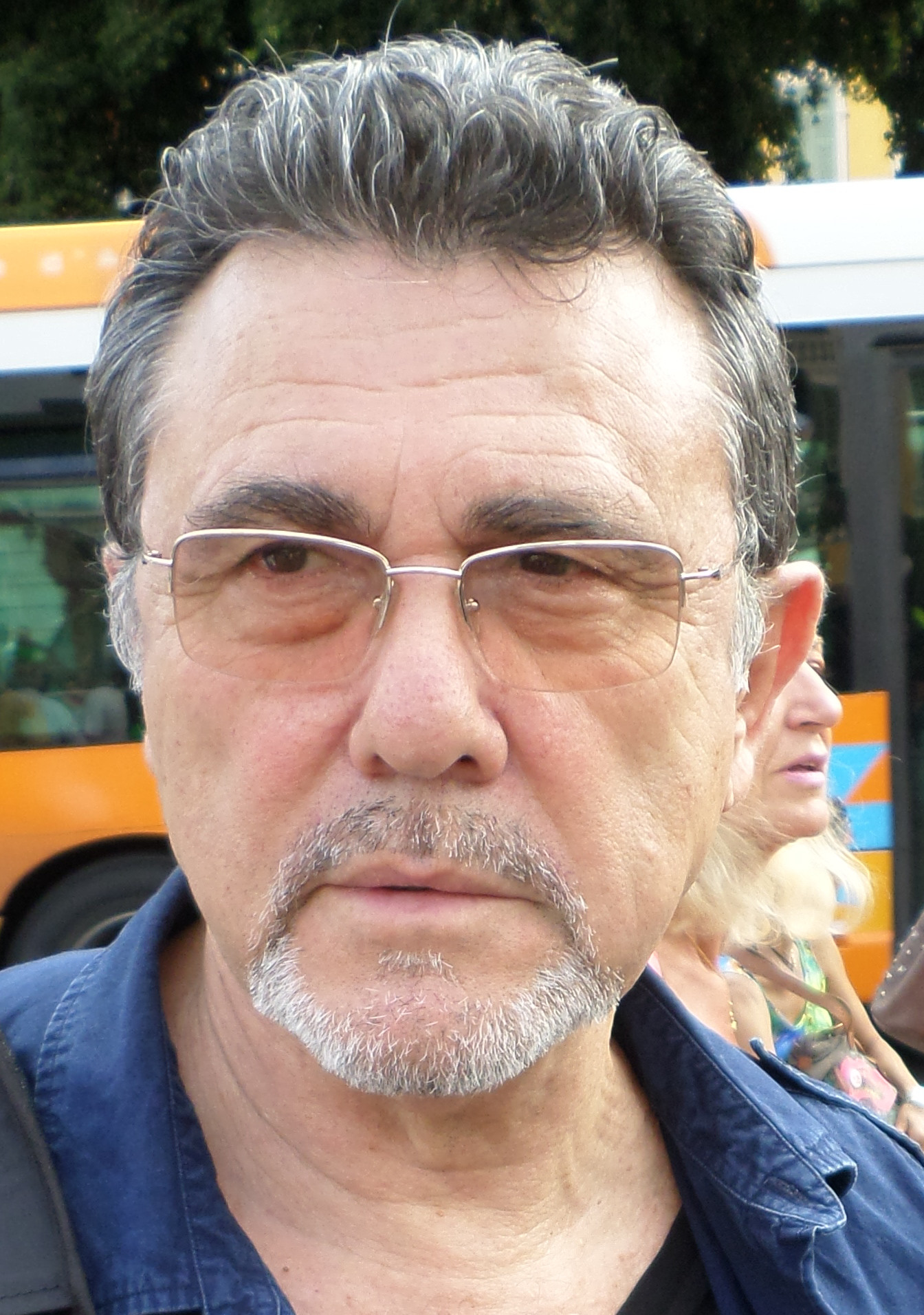
- Sand in 2014
- Born: 10 September 1946 (age 80); Linz, Austria

Academic background
- Education: 1978–1982, Doctoral student at the École des Hautes Études en Sciences Sociales

Academic work
- Era: Contemporary
- Institutions: 1983–1985, Maître assistant associé, École des Hautes Études en Sciences Sociales; 1988–1994, Tenure, Tel Aviv University; 1995–2001, Associate Professor, Tel Aviv University; 2002–2014, Full Professor, Tel Aviv University; 2014–present, Professor Emeritus, Tel Aviv University
- Main interests: History of Jews
- Notable works: The Invention of the Jewish People
- Notable ideas: Non-Zionism

Shlomo Sand (pronounced Zand; Hebrew: שלמה זנד; born 10 September 1946) is an Israeli post-Zionist historian and socialist. He has served as an emeritus Professor of History at Tel Aviv University since 2014. He is known for his book The Invention of the Jewish People, originally published in Hebrew as Matai ve'eich humtsa ha'am hayehudi? (מתי ואיך הומצא העם היהודי? When and How Was the Jewish People Invented?) in 2008.

== Biography ==
Sand was born in Linz, Austria, to Polish Jewish Holocaust survivors. His cultural background was grounded in Yiddish culture. His father, having taken an aversion to rabbis, abandoned his Talmudic studies at a yeshiva and dropped attendance at synagogues, after his mother was denied a front seat after her husband's death, and they could not afford the seat price. Both his parents had communist and anti-imperialist views and refused to accept compensation from Germany for their suffering during the Second World War. Sand spent his first two years in a displaced persons camp near Munich, and moved with the family to Jaffa in 1948, where his father got a job as night porter in the headquarters of the local Communist party. He was expelled from high school at the age of sixteen, studied electronics by night and found employment by day in a radio repair business. Drafted in 1965, he served at the communist kibbutz of Yad Hanna. According to one interview, "Sand spent the late 1960s and early 1970s working a series of odd jobs, including several years as a telephone lineman." He completed his high-school work at age 25 and spent three years in the military. The Six-Day War, in which he served – his unit conquered at heavy loss the Abu Tor area in East Jerusalem – pushed him towards the radical left. After the war he served in Jericho, where, he says, Palestinians trying to return to the country were gunned down if they came at night but were arrested if caught doing so by day. Such experiences, particularly one incident in which he reports his fellow soldiers beat and tortured a restrained Palestinian man to death, left him with a sense that he had lost his homeland.

He was friends with the Palestinian poet Mahmoud Darwish, with whom he was involved in the Rakah communist party, and a conversation between the two inspired Darwish's 1967 poem "A Soldier Dreams Of White Lilies," (Note: Also translated as "A Soldier Dreams of White Tulips".) though it was not revealed at the time that the soldier was Sand.

Quitting the Union of Israeli Communist Youth (Banki), Sand joined the more radical, and anti-Zionist, Matzpen in 1968. He resigned from Matzpen in 1970 due to his disillusionment with the organisation.

Declining an offer by the Israeli Maki Communist Party to be sent to do cinema studies in Poland, Sand graduated with a BA in History from Tel Aviv University in 1975. Determined to "abandon everything" Israeli, he moved to France, where, from 1975 to 1985, after winning a scholarship, he studied and taught in Paris, receiving an MA in French History and a PhD for his thesis on Georges Sorel and Marxism. Since 1982, Sand has taught at Tel Aviv University as well as at the University of California, Berkeley, and the École des hautes études en sciences sociales in Paris.

In 1983, according to one source, Sand "took part in a heated exchange over Zeev Sternhell's Ni droite, ni gauche: l'idéologie fasciste en France, and later drew the ire of Claude Lanzmann with his 2002 book in Hebrew, Film as History, in which he not only passed scathing judgement on Lanzmann's Shoah, but also revealed that the film had been secretly funded by the Israeli government."

== Views and opinions ==
While acknowledging "the affinity between Jews and the holy land," Sand has said that "I don't think the religious affinity to the land gives you historical right." Expounding on this argument, in 2012, Sand wrote:

[I]t always seemed to me that a sincere attempt to organize the world as it was organized hundreds or thousands of years ago would mean the injection of violent deceptive insanity into the overall system of international relations. Would anyone today consider encouraging an Arab demand to settle in the Iberian Peninsula to establish a Muslim state there simply because their ancestors were expelled from the region during the Reconquista? Why should the descendants of the Puritans who were forced to leave England centuries ago not attempt to return en masse to the land of their forefathers in order to establish the heavenly kingdom? Would any sane person support Native American demands to assume territorial possession of Manhattan and to expel its white, black, Asian and Latino inhabitants? And somewhat more recently are we obligated to assist the Serbs in returning to Kosovo and reasserting control over the region because of the sacred heroic battle of 1389 or because Orthodox Christians who spoke a Serbian dialect constituted a decisive majority of the local population a mere two hundred years ago?

Nevertheless, Sand supports Israel's existence "not because of historical right, but because of the fact that it exists today and any effort to destroy it will bring new tragedies." He explained that he does not call himself a Zionist, but "a post-Zionist and non-Zionist because the justification of this land is not historical right." Comparing the Palestinians to children of rape, Sand has said that Israel "raped a population. And not only a population – we destroyed this society, in constituting the Israeli state." He opposes the Law of Return and the right of return. Still, "Israel has to be the state of Israelis. That is the only way we can continue to live in the Middle East." He argues that before Hitler, Jews were overwhelmingly against Zionism, and the concept of "Eretz Israel" was not about an earthly homeland but about something more spiritual. He also opposes the one-state solution because, while "very very popular in leftist circles," it is "not serious" because Israelis, being "one of the most racist societies in the western world," will never accept it. Thus he supports a "two state solution on the borders of ’67, taking out most of the settlers. I don’t think it will be a big problem." His position on the formation of a national identity extends to Palestinians, who did not, in his view, exist as a people before the rise of Zionism.

=== Criticism of gene studies ===
Sand argues both against the notion of defining a nation based on genetic principles, and against the concrete results and reliability of genetic studies focusing on ethnic markers.

In 2010, when Harry Ostrer, a professor of genetics at the Albert Einstein College of Medicine, announced the results of a DNA study showing "powerful genetic markers of Jewish ancestry," Sand told Science Magazine that "Hitler would certainly have been very pleased." Writing in The Chronicle of Higher Education, Josh Fischman commented that Sand's argument in The Invention of the Jewish People that Jews arose from multiple conversions among various communities in Europe and elsewhere contradicted work by Harry Ostrer which argued that "geographically and culturally distant Jews still have more genes in common than they do with non-Jews around them," and that such genes were of Levantine origin," including the area where modern Israel is situated. Ostrer himself took offense at Sand's attack on his work: "Bringing up Hitler was overheated and misconstrues my work," he said. Sand reiterated his criticism, writing in an email to Fischman that "It is a shame for somebody who defines himself as a Jew to look for a Jewish gene."

Geneticist Dr. Eran Elhaik has published two research papers which cite Sand's work extensively. The first, "The Missing Link of Jewish European Ancestry: Contrasting the Rhineland and the Khazarian Hypotheses", came out in December 2012 argued that genetic evidence points to a "mosaic of Near Eastern-Caucasus, European, and Semitic ancestries" within the founding population of modern European Jews. The theory proved highly controversial, and was contested by a number of historians and several geneticists. Elhaik's second paper, in collaboration with others, similarly used Sand's work and concluded that the Ashkenazi descend from 'a heterogeneous Iranian population, which later mixed with Eastern and Western Slavs and possibly some Turks and Greeks in the territory of the Khazar Empire around the 8th century A.D.'

The overwhelming majority of genetic studies on the Jewish diaspora, specifically Ashkenazi jews, have not confirmed the Khazar myth and have instead identified a common origin in the Middle East.

== Published works ==
=== The Invention of the Jewish People ===
Sand's best-known book in English is The Invention of the Jewish People, originally published in Hebrew (Resling, 2008) as Matai ve'eich humtsa ha'am hayehudi? (מתי ואיך הומצא העם היהודי? When and How Was the Jewish People Invented?) and translated into English the following year (Verso, 2009). It has generated a heated controversy.

Sand reconstructs how the myths of Jewish nationalism were forged by certain 19th-century historians, starting with Heinrich Graetz, who took the Hebrew Bible as a reliable historical source. Sand was criticized, mainly by Zionist historians, for presenting allegedly "dubious theories" regarding Jewish identity as historical facts. He argues that several ancient peoples were forcibly converted to Judaism, starting with the Idumeans, while numerous individuals voluntarily embraced Judaism throughout the Roman Empire and neighboring polities. Sand also espouses the hypothesis that Ashkenazi Jews are descended from Khazars who converted in the early Middle Ages, which is vehemently denied by other Israeli scholars. Like early Zionists such as Israel Belkind, Sand dismisses the misconception of a massive exile of Judeans in the first century CE and argues that Palestinians are mostly descended from the Judean population of that time. All these arguments challenge the ideological foundations of the State of Israel.

The book was in the best-seller list in Israel for nineteen weeks. It was reprinted three times when published in French (Comment le peuple juif fut inventé, Fayard, Paris, 2008). In France, it received the "Prix Aujourd'hui", a journalists' award given to a non-fiction political or historical work. An English translation of the book was published by Verso Books in October 2009. The book has also been translated into German, Italian, Spanish, Portuguese, Arabic, Russian, and Slovene and as of late 2009 further translations were underway. As of 2009, The Invention of the Jewish People has been translated into more languages than any other Israeli history book.

=== The Invention of the Land of Israel ===
In April 2012, a sequel, The Invention of the Land of Israel, was published in Hebrew by Kinneret Zmora-Bitan Dvir. It was published in English in 2013.

=== How I Stopped Being a Jew ===
In 2013, Sand published How I Stopped Being a Jew which examines the question of Jewish identity and the distinction between being a Jew and being Israeli. It also examines the identity of Israel, with a focus on the country's relationship, as a "Jewish state," to Jews around the world and to its non-Jewish citizens. He expresses a desire to break with what he sees as a "tribal Judeocentrism" subject to the "caprices of the sleepwalking sorcerers of the tribe," expressing a deep attachment to the Hebrew language and to a secular ideal of Israel.

=== The End of the French Intellectual ===
Sand's 2016 book La fin de l'intellectuel français? was published in English in 2018 as The End of the French Intellectual (with the question mark omitted). It is a critique of three contemporary French intellectuals, Michel Houellebecq, Éric Zemmour and Alain Finkielkraut.

== Other publications ==
- L'Illusion du politique, Paris, La Découverte, 1984
- Intellectuals, Truth and Power: From the Dreyfus Affair to the Gulf War, Tel Aviv, Am Oved, 2000 (in Hebrew).
- Le XXe siècle à l'écran, Paris, Seuil, 2004 (also in Hebrew and Spanish).
- Historians, Time and Imagination, Tel Aviv, Am Oved, 2004 (in Hebrew ).
- The Words and the Land, Los Angeles, Semiotext, 2011 (also in French).
- Twilight of History, London, Verso, 2017 (also in Hebrew and French).
- J. Julliard & S. Sand (eds.), Georges Sorel en son temps, Paris, Seuil, 1985
- H. Bresheeth, M. Zimmerman & S. Sand (eds.), Cinema and Memory, Jerusalem, Zalman Shazar, 2004 (in Hebrew).
- S. Sand (ed.), Ernest Renan – On the Nation and the Jewish People. London, Verso, 2010 (also in French and Hebrew).
