= Khazarian Mafia =

Antisemitic conspiracy theory invoking the medieval Khazars

The Khazarian Mafia is an antisemitic conspiracy theory alleging that a clandestine cabal of "fake" Jews – supposedly descended from the medieval Khazars – controls global finance, media, and politics. The phrase has circulated widely on fringe media and social platforms since the 2010s–2020s and was further weaponized during the 2022 Russian invasion of Ukraine to malign Ukrainians and Jews and to rationalize Russian aggression. Researchers identify the narrative as a rebranding of older antisemitic tropes (including the blood libel) coupled to a modern misuse of the contested and largely rejected "Khazar hypothesis of Ashkenazi ancestry".

== Background ==
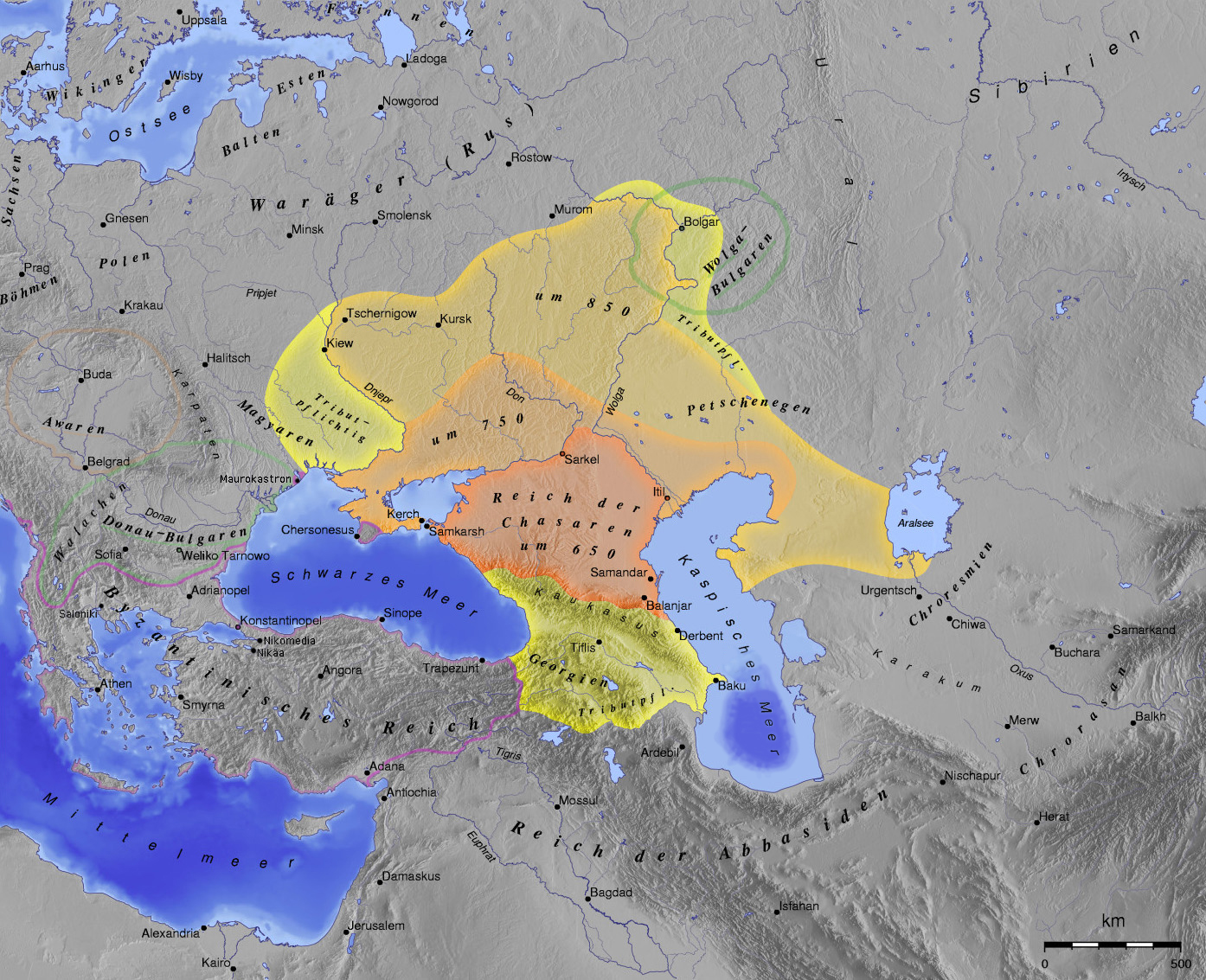
Khazar Khaganate, 650–850

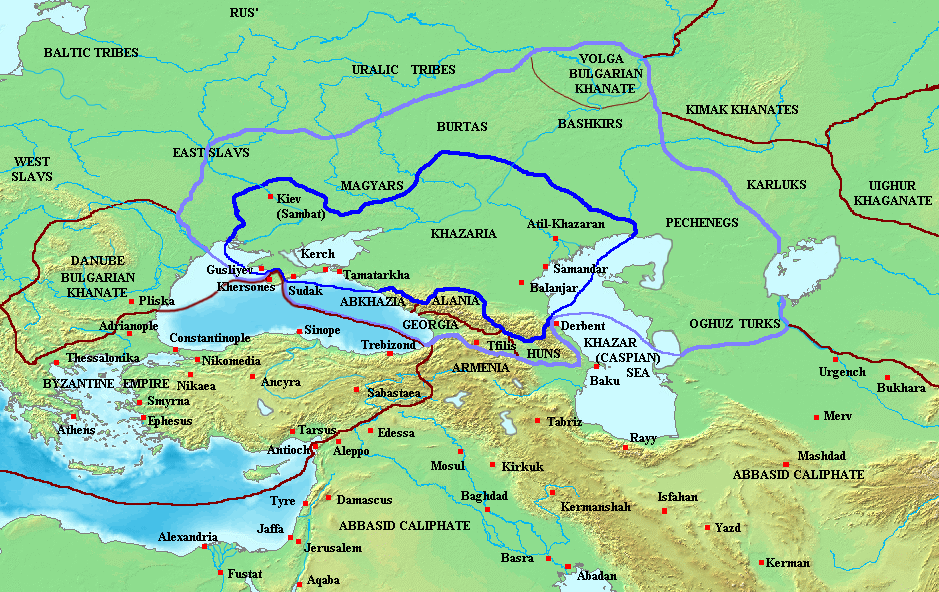
Map of the Khazar Khaganate and surrounding states, c. 820. Peer-reviewed genetic studies do not support a Khazar origin for Ashkenazi Jews.

The label "Khazarian Mafia" borrows from the historical Khazar Khaganate (7th–10th centuries), whose elites are described in some medieval sources as having adopted Judaism; however, modern scholarship disputes the scope and historicity of any mass conversion and rejects claims that most Ashkenazi Jews descend from Khazars. The contemporary conspiracy theory crystallized on fringe outlets and blogs; for example, Veterans Today has repeatedly published articles describing a trans-historical "Khazarian Mafia."

== Origins and development ==
In the mid-20th century, Arthur Koestler's 1976 book The Thirteenth Tribe popularized a narrative that many Eastern European Jews were of Khazar origin; while the book sparked public interest, academic responses highlighted its methodological flaws and the problematic political uses of its thesis. Conspiracist and far-right actors have since used Koestler's work to promote antisemitism.

The specific label "Khazarian Mafia" was popularized from 2015 onward through articles on Veterans Today, principally by writers Preston James and Mike Harris, who co-authored "The Hidden History of the Incredibly Evil Khazarian Mafia." Extremism monitors and think tanks trace the contemporary usage of the phrase to blogs and channels that package older antisemitic tropes with modern geopolitics, noting that much of the material comes from conspiracist outlets and self-published pamphlets making extraordinary claims without mainstream historical support.

== Core claims ==
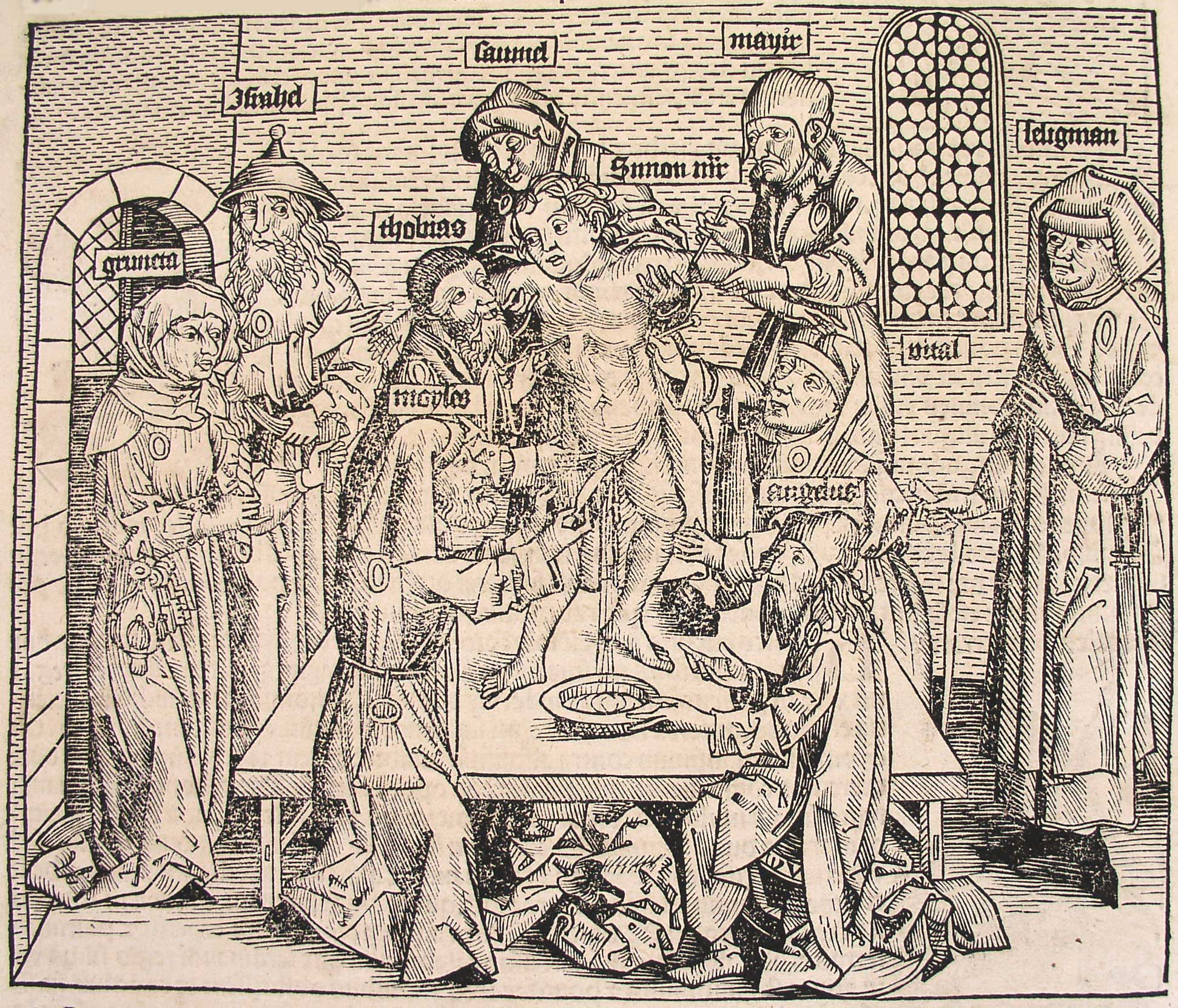
Woodcut from Hartmann Schedel's Nuremberg Chronicle (1493) depicting the blood libel of Simon of Trent, an older antisemitic trope that analysts link to the modern "Khazarian Mafia" narrative

Analysts summarize that proponents assert (1) modern Jews—especially Ashkenazi Jews—are not "real" Jews but "Khazars" who secretly control world events; (2) a hidden "mafia" manipulates wars, pandemics, and economies; and (3) Ukraine is a "Khazarian" project or state, claims that researchers classify as antisemitic and baseless. Media watchdogs have documented repeated promotion of the phrase on large online communities and platforms.

Typical narrative elements include blood-oath and ritualized-evil stories, naming of specific families (most prominently the Rothschilds) as fronts for the alleged cabal, and linking modern states, especially Ukraine, to a "Khazarian" project. The Conspiracy Watch monitoring group notes that the main representatives invoked in "Khazarian Mafia" rhetoric typically include the Rothschilds, Kissinger, Soros, or any other prominent Ashkenazi-sounding name, and that the word "Khazarian" has become an encoded term synonymous with "Jew” or "Israeli."Several conspiratorial and antisemitic authors have used the term in their works, including David Icke and Henry Makow.

== Rhetorical function ==
According to the Institute for Strategic Dialogue (ISD), in far-right and conspiracy Telegram channels the terms "Khazars" and "Khazarian Mafia" are used to describe Jewish people in a manner similar to how "Rothschild" may be deployed, ostensibly to soften antisemitic statements and provide plausible deniability. The claim that Ashkenazi Jews are not descendants of ancient Israelites but of Khazars allows antisemites to assert that they only oppose "fake Jews" and "impostors" rather than Jewish people as a whole.

== Use during the Russian invasion of Ukraine ==
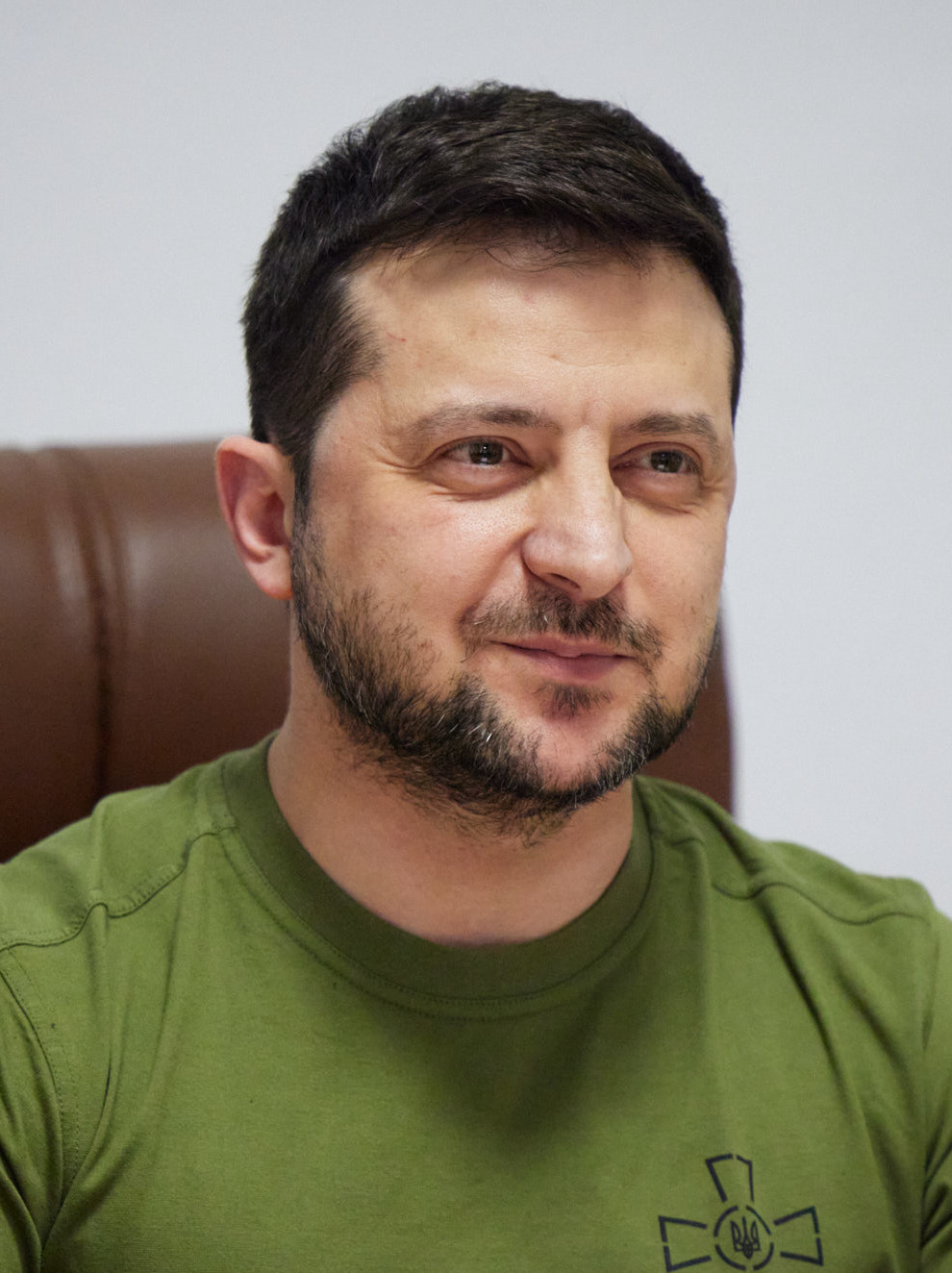
Volodymyr Zelenskyy addressing the United States Congress in March 2022. Conspiracy theorists falsely cast Zelenskyy and Ukraine as part of a "Khazarian" project

From early 2022, researchers tracked the "Khazarian Mafia" trope on Telegram and other platforms as part of pro-Kremlin propaganda framing, casting Ukraine as a "Khazarian" project and using the rhetoric to justify or sanitize Russia's war. Since Khazaria spanned territories corresponding to modern-day southeastern Russia, southern Ukraine, Crimea, and Kazakhstan, the conspiracy theory acquired a distinct geographic relevance in the context of the war. Regional and European fact-checkers have debunked claims that President Volodymyr Zelenskyy intends to create a "Khazarian Jewish state" in Ukraine and western Russia and have contextualized such narratives as antisemitic conspiracism.

The Anti-Defamation League (ADL) documented that since Russia's invasion on February 24, 2022, extremists and antisemites across the ideological spectrum used the war as fodder for promoting antisemitic conspiracy theories, with some referring to the "Khazarian Mafia" or the "Khazarian invasion" to justify and even celebrate Russia's aggression. Believers in the theory claimed that Putin's incursion into Ukraine was a means to help counter an alleged invasion of "Khazar Jews."

The Online Hate Prevention Institute (OHPI) reported a resurgence of Khazarian conspiracy posts on X, Gab, and Facebook in 2025, linked to diplomatic developments between Ukrainian and U.S. leadership regarding rare earth minerals and potential peace negotiations. OHPI characterized the conspiracy as "radically antisemitic" for its premise that Jews are powerful and wicked figures capable of plotting wars to depopulate a European country in order to re-establish an ancient medieval kingdom.

== Overlap with QAnon and other conspiracy movements ==
The "Khazarian Mafia" narrative has been absorbed into several other conspiracist ecosystems. The ADL documented that QAnon social media accounts posted antisemitic conspiratorial content invoking the theory after the Russian invasion began, and that QAnon influencer Ann Vandersteel promoted the Khazarian myth to her 37,000-plus Telegram channel subscribers. In the Telegram channel operated by GhostEzra, described as one of the most popular QAnon influencers with more than 294,000 subscribers, users shared antisemitic rhetoric tied to the theory.

The ISD found that the theory circulated in QAnon, Sovereigntist, and right-wing extremist Telegram channels, where posts equated the "Khazarian Mafia" with "Ukrainian Nazis" and framed the Russia-Ukraine war as a continuation of medieval conflicts. A data-driven academic study of Sovereign Citizens' Telegram channels published at the 2024 AAAI CySoc workshop found that the term "Khazarian Mafia" was linked to the Khazar hypothesis and was semantically associated with the word "Jews" in the movements' online lexicon, demonstrating overlap between Sovereign Citizens and QAnon beliefs.

Research published in The Conversation found that conspiracy theorists on Telegram attempted to link the Hamas attacks of October 7, 2023, and the Russia-Ukraine war through shared antisemitic narratives, with the Russian invasion characterized as a justified resistance against the "Khazarian Mafia" and the Hamas attack framed as an assault against "fake Zionist Ashkenazi Jews." Both conflicts were cast as "new world order" plots by proponents who believe powerful elites, often characterized as Jewish, are secretly working to establish a totalitarian world government.

== Online spread and platform presence ==
=== Telegram ===
The ISD's 2022 research, which focused predominantly on German-language far-right and conspiracy Telegram channels, documented how the "Khazarian Mafia" conspiracy was being directed at the war in Ukraine across these networks. The research found that content was shared from English-language sources or translated to German from other languages, indicating cross-linguistic propagation. A convicted Holocaust denier from Germany referenced Koestler's theory in a BitChute video, speculating about a Jewish plan to build a "Heavenly Jerusalem" in Ukraine.

=== Reddit ===
Media Matters for America documented in September 2023 that Reddit's r/conspiracy subreddit, which had two million members, repeatedly hosted content promoting the "Khazarian Mafia" conspiracy theory despite Reddit rules prohibiting antisemitic content. Users on the subreddit invoked the conspiracy to discuss events ranging from the Russia-Ukraine war to 9/11 to vaccine development, with posts claiming a "Khazarian Mafia" was behind diverse global events.

=== Facebook ===
The ADL found that Facebook posts linked to problematic sites at concerning rates during the early months of the 2022 invasion, with users spreading claims that Russia was "setting Ukraine free" from the "Khazarian Jewish Mafia" alongside other conspiratorial themes such as the Great Reset and allegations of Jewish control of central banking. Unlike Twitter, Facebook had no policy blocking links to hate speech and violence at the time, allowing posts to direct users to conspiracy sites and antisemitic content.

== Relationship to the Khazar hypothesis ==
Peer-reviewed population-genetic studies do not support a Khazar origin for Ashkenazi Jews, instead indicating ancestry primarily from Middle Eastern and European populations with medieval admixture in Europe. Historians likewise question the evidentiary basis for any mass Khazar conversion to Judaism and regard the popular narrative as an overextended reading of sparse sources.

== Scholarly and watchdog assessments ==
Think tanks and anti-hate organizations describe "Khazarian Mafia" as a modern packaging of classic antisemitic tropes, often bundled with ones about "globalists," the "Rothschilds," and ritual evil. Media monitors have cataloged the phrase's use on high-traffic forums such as Reddit's r/conspiracy, where posts have promoted the "Khazarian mafia" conspiracy theory.

The ISD concluded that the "Khazarian Mafia myth did not emerge with the war in Ukraine, and nor will it end with it," predicting that the narrative will be adapted to future major news events. Research has shown a strong relationship between conspiracy theories and antisemitism more broadly; antisemitism in the United States reached unprecedented levels in 2021 and 2022, a period of overlapping global crises during which such narratives proliferated online.

Mike Rothschild, a journalist and researcher on conspiracy theories, has told Media Matters that the theory is rooted in antisemitism, explaining that it frames Ashkenazi Jews not as Middle Eastern in origin but as descendants of a nomadic tribe, thereby stripping them of their identity and historical claims.

== Notable propagation ==
Fringe platforms and personalities have provided recurring venues for the narrative. Veterans Today published the article "The Hidden History of the Incredibly Evil Khazarian Mafia," attributed to Preston James and Mike Harris, which became one of the most widely circulated documents within conspiracist ecosystems, shared alongside interviews on fringe podcasts and video platforms. The Conspiracy Watch monitoring group identifies several authors who have used the "Khazarian" framing, including David Icke and Henry Makow, the latter of whom describes the Khazars as a "satanic sect" pulling the strings of the New World Order.

During the early months of the Russia-Ukraine war, prominent QAnon-adjacent figures also amplified the narrative. The ADL documented that QAnon influencer Ann Vandersteel shared downloadable documents describing the alleged conspiracy to her tens of thousands of Telegram followers. The fundamentalist Christian platform TruNews, hosted by Rick Wiles, used "Zionist" and "Jew" interchangeably while promoting related claims that "Zionists" were driving the world to war for profit. Commentator Candace Owens has circulated or flirted with "Khazarian" origin narratives, promoting claims that Ashkenazi Jews are "fake Jews" descended from the medieval Khazar Empire.

== See also ==
- Antisemitic conspiracy theories – False claims about Jews and Judaism
- Blood libel – Antisemitic trope
- Khazar hypothesis of Ashkenazi ancestry – Largely abandoned fringe theory on Ashkenazi descent
- Russian invasion of Ukraine – Phase since 2022 of war ongoing since 2014
- Disinformation – Deliberately misleading information
- QAnon – American conspiracy theory and political movement
- The Thirteenth Tribe – 1976 book by Arthur Koestler
- The Protocols of the Elders of Zion – 1903 antisemitic text
- Sovereign citizen movement – Anti-government conspiracy movement
- Veterans Today – Fake news website
- Weaponization of antisemitism – Politically motivated accusations of antisemitism
