= The Invention of the Jewish People =

2008 book by Shlomo Sand

- English first edition cover
- Author: Shlomo Sand
- Original title: מתי ואיך הומצא העם היהודי?
- Translator: Yael Lotan
- Language: Hebrew
- Subject: Historiography of the Jewish people
- Publisher: Resling (Hebrew 1st ed.); Verso Books (English 1st ed.)
- Publication date: 2008
- Publication place: Israel
- English publication date: 2009
- Media type: Print (Hardcover)
- Pages: 358 p. (Hebrew 1st ed.); 332 p. (English 1st ed.)
- ISBN: 978-1-84467-422-0
- OCLC: 317919518
- LC Class: DS143.S23 2008 Hebr (Hebrew 1st ed.)

The Invention of the Jewish People (Hebrew: מתי ואיך הומצא העם היהודי?, romanized: Matai ve’ech humtza ha’am hayehudi?, lit. 'When and How Was the Jewish People Invented?') is a 2008 book by Shlomo Sand, Professor of History at Tel Aviv University, in which he challenges ideas of Jewish peoplehood developed in Jewish historiography since the 19th century. In the book, Sand disputes the historical veracity of the narrative of forced exile of Jews from Palestine under the Romans, arguing instead that most modern Jews descend from converts to Judaism whose native lands were in locations across the Middle East and Eastern Europe.

The book was on the best-seller list in Israel for nineteen weeks and has generated heated controversy.

An English edition of the book, translated by Yael Lotan, was published by Verso Books in October 2009. The book has also been translated into German, Italian, Spanish, Portuguese, Arabic, French and Russian, and as of late 2009 further translations were underway.

== Book summary ==
=== Introduction ===
The introduction, subtitled "Burdens of Memory", is divided into two parts: Identity in Movement and Constructed Memories.

In Identity in Movement, Sand presents some personal anecdotes in the way of a positionality statement to indicate how some of his experiences influence his scholarly research. In one anecdote, Sand refers to his Rakah friend Mahmoud Darwish, a Palestinian present absentee and poet, and reveals that Darwish's poem "A Soldier Dreams of White Lilies" was about Sand as an Israeli soldier in the 1967 Arab–Israeli War.

In Constructed Memories, Sand likens nationalist historical narratives to "statues in city squares—they must be grand, towering, heroic" and describes the works embodying a nationalist historiography that dominated until the late 20th century as reading like "the sports page in a local paper: 'Us' and 'All the Others'". Sand cites the development of various nationalist histories and their dependence on their own national myths, then gives his impression of the nationalist imagination of Jewish Israelis:

For Israelis, specifically those of Jewish origin, such mythologies are farfetched, whereas their own history rests on firm and precise truths. They know for a certainty that a Jewish nation has been in existence since Moses received the tablets of the law on Mount Sinai, and that they are its direct and exclusive descendants (except for the ten tribes, who are yet to be located). They are convinced that this nation "came out" of Egypt; conquered and settled "the Land of Israel," which had been famously promised it by the deity; created the magnificent kingdom of David and Solomon, which then split into the kingdoms of Judah and Israel. They are also convinced that this nation was exiled, not once but twice, after its periods of glory—after the fall of the First Temple in the sixth century BCE, and again after the fall of the Second Temple, in 70 CE. Yet even before that second exile, this unique nation had created the Hebrew Hasmonean kingdom, which revolted against the wicked influence of Hellenization.

They believe that these people—their "nation," which must be the most ancient—wandered in exile for nearly two thousand years and yet, despite this prolonged stay among the gentiles, managed to avoid integration with, or assimilation into, them. The nation scattered widely, its bitter wanderings taking it to Yemen, Morocco, Spain, Germany, Poland, and distant Russia, but it always managed to maintain close blood relations among the far-flung communities and to preserve its distinctiveness.

Then, at the end of the nineteenth century, they contend, rare circumstances combined to wake the ancient people from its long slumber and to prepare it for rejuvenation and for the return to its ancient homeland. And so the nation began to return, joyfully, in vast numbers. Many Israelis still believe that, but for Hitler's horrible massacre, "Eretz Israel" would soon have been filled with millions of Jews making "aliyah" by their own free will, because they had dreamed of it for thousands of years.

And while the wandering people needed a territory of its own, the empty, virgin land longed for a nation to come and make it bloom. Some uninvited guests had, it is true, settled in this homeland, but since "the people kept faith with it throughout their Dispersion" for two millennia, the land belonged only to that people, and not to that handful without history who had merely stumbled upon it. Therefore the wars waged by the wandering nation in its conquest of the country were justified; the violent resistance of the local population was criminal; and it was only the (highly unbiblical) charity of the Jews that permitted these strangers to remain and dwell among and beside the nation, which had returned to its biblical language and its wondrous land.

This narrative, according to Sand, was built with contributions from "gifted reconstructors of the past, beginning in the second half of the nineteenth century." He reviews the literature of modern Jewish historiography and raises various questions that he says scholars of Jewish history do not regularly address, with many of these raising criticisms of Zionism and Israeli policies. Sand also acknowledges possible limitations in his own work—especially with regard to straddling fields in which he is a non-specialist and having to work alone when he would have liked to work collaboratively—and emphasizes:

Please note: the present work, which proposes that the Jews have always comprised significant religious communities that appeared and settled in various parts of the world, rather than an ethnos that shared a single origin and wandered in a permanent exile, does not deal directly with history. Given that its main purpose is to criticize a widespread historiographic discourse, it cannot avoid suggesting alternative narratives.

Sand began his work by looking for research studies about forcible exile of Jews from the region of Palestine and surrounding areas. He was astonished that he could find no such literature, he says, given that the expulsion of Jews from the region is viewed as a constitutive event in Jewish history. The conclusion he came to from his subsequent investigation is that the expulsion simply did not happen, that no one exiled the Jewish people from the region, and that the Jewish diaspora is essentially a modern invention. He accounts for the appearance of millions of Jews around the Mediterranean and elsewhere as something that came about primarily through the religious conversion of local people, saying that Judaism, contrary to popular opinion, was very much a "converting religion" in former times. He holds that mass conversions were first brought about by the Hasmoneans under the influence of Hellenism, and continued until Christianity rose to dominance in the fourth century CE.

=== Jewish origins ===
Sand argues that it is likely that the ancestry of most contemporary Jews stems mainly from outside the Land of Israel and that a "nation-race" of Jews with a common origin never existed, and that just as most Christians and Muslims are the progeny of converted people, not of the first Christians and Muslims, Jews are also descended from converts. According to Sand, Judaism was originally, like its two cousins, a proselytising religion, and mass conversions to Judaism occurred among the Khazars in the Caucasus, Berber tribes in North Africa, and in the Himyarite Kingdom of the Arabian Peninsula.

According to Sand, the original Jews living in Israel, contrary to popular belief, were not exiled by the Romans following the Bar Kokhba revolt. The Romans permitted most Jews to remain in the country. Rather, the story of the exile was a myth promoted by early Christians to recruit Jews to the new faith. They portrayed that event as a divine punishment imposed on the Jews for having rejected the Christian gospel. Sand writes that "Christians wanted later generations of Jews to believe that their ancestors had been exiled as a punishment from God." Following the Arab conquest of Palestine in the 7th century, many local Jews converted to Islam and were assimilated among the Arab conquerors. Sand concludes that these converts are the ancestors of the contemporary Palestinians.

=== Jewish peoplehood ===
Sand's explanation of the birth of the "myth" of a Jewish people as a group with a common, ethnic origin has been summarized as follows: "[a]t a certain stage in the 19th century intellectuals of Jewish origin in Germany, influenced by the folk character of German nationalism, took upon themselves the task of inventing a people "retrospectively," out of a thirst to create a modern Jewish people. From historian Heinrich Graetz on, Jewish historians began to draw the history of Judaism as the history of a nation that had been a kingdom, became a wandering people and ultimately turned around and went back to its birthplace."

In this, Sand writes, they were similar to other nationalist movements in Europe at the time that sought the reassurance of a Golden Age in their past to prove they have existed as a separate people since the beginnings of history. Jewish people found theirs in what he calls "the mythical Kingdom of David". Before this invention, he says, Jews thought of themselves as Jews because they shared a common religion, Judaism, not a common ethnic background.

=== Return from exile, Zionism ===
Sand believes that the idea of Jews being obliged to return from exile to the Promised Land was alien to Judaism before the birth of Zionism, and that the holy places were seen as places to long for, not to be lived in. On the contrary, for 2,000 years Jews stayed away from Jerusalem because their religion forbade them from returning until the Messiah came. According to Sand, the ancestry of Central and Eastern European Jews stems heavily from mediæval Turkic Khazars who were converted to Judaism, a theory which was popularized in a book written by Arthur Koestler in 1976.

=== Overall intent of the book ===
Sand explained during a newspaper interview his reasons for writing the book: "I wrote the book for a double purpose. First, as an Israeli, to democratise the state; to make it a real republic. Second, I wrote the book against Jewish essentialism."

Sand explained in the same interview that what he means by 'Jewish essentialism' is, in the words of the interviewer, "the tendency in modern Judaism to make shared ethnicity the basis for faith." "That is dangerous and it nourishes antisemitism. I am trying to normalise the Jewish presence in history and contemporary life," Sand said.

== Reception ==
Sand's book has provoked a range of responses from different points of view.

=== As a work of history ===
Writing in the Financial Times, British historian Tony Judt commented that critics call Sand's work "at best redundant" because the sources he cites and the arguments he makes are not new, but the message is helpful to popular audiences familiar with "the caricatured version of Jewish history that he is seeking to discredit". He concludes: "If Prof Sand’s popularising work does nothing more than provoke reflection and further reading among such a constituency, it will have been worthwhile."

British historian Eric Hobsbawm selected Sand's book as one of his "Books of the Year" for 2009: "Shlomo Sand's The Invention of the Jewish People (Verso) is both a welcome and, in the case of Israel, much needed exercise in the dismantling of nationalist historical myth and a plea for an Israel that belongs equally to all its inhabitants."

In a commentary published in Haaretz, Israel Bartal, dean of the humanities faculty of the Hebrew University, writes that Sand's claims about Zionist and contemporary Israeli historiography are baseless, calling the work "bizarre and incoherent," and that Sand's "…treatment of Jewish sources is embarrassing and humiliating." According to Bartal, "No historian of the Jewish national movement has ever really believed that the origins of the Jews are ethnically and biologically 'pure'." Bartal writes that Sand applies academically marginal positions to the entire body of Jewish historiography and, in doing so, "denies the existence of the central positions in Jewish historical scholarship." Sand, for example, does not mention the fact that, from 2000 onwards, a team of scholars from the Hebrew University of Jerusalem labored on the production of a three-volume study on the history of the Jews of Russia. He adds that "the kind of political intervention Sand is talking about, namely, a deliberate program designed to make Israelis forget the true biological origins of the Jews of Poland and Russia or a directive for the promotion of the story of the Jews' exile from their homeland is pure fantasy."

In a review, Washington Post journalist David Finkel writes that the book's chapter on 'Mythistory' is "where Sand fully hits his stride. It is not so much Jewish history but rather historiography that's decisive ..." Finkel writes that Bartal "disputes little of Sands’ history but focuses on his historiography," and suggests, "doesn’t all this precisely prove Sand’s point? The professional intellectuals ... have no need for crude myths. Yet this does not prevent every Israeli government, right, center or 'left', through which many of these same intellectuals may rotate as ministers, advisors or spokespersons, from justifying land grabs, settlements and demolition of Palestinian homes all over 'Greater Jerusalem' under the banner of 'the eternal capital of the Jewish people.'"

Evan R. Goldstein, editor at the Chronicle of Higher Education, has called it, in part, a recycled version of The Thirteenth Tribe, another book with a controversial thesis on the genesis of the Jewish people published in 1976 by Arthur Koestler. "'The Thirteenth Tribe' was received coolly by critics, and Mr. Sand's repackaging of its central argument has not fared much better," commented Goldstein. He further argues that there is not enough known about the 13th century demography of Eastern European Jews to credibly make as bold a claim as Sand's.

Historian Anita Shapira criticizes Sand for regularly "grab(bing) at the most unorthodox theory" in a field and then stretching it "to the outer limits of logic and beyond" during Sand's survey of three thousand years of history. Shapira says that Sand's political program makes the book an attempt to "drag history into a topical argument, and with the help of misrepresentations and half-truths to adapt it to the needs of a political discussion."

Carlo Strenger writes that Sand's book is "not a pure work of history" and argues that, "in fact, it has a clearly stated political agenda. ... It might come as a surprise to some who have not read the book that Sand's goal is to preserve Israel as a democracy with a Jewish character based on a Jewish majority."

According to historian Shaul Stampfer, "even though it's a wonderful story", the mass conversion of Khazars to Judaism never took place.

According to American writer Daniel Lazare, The Invention of the Jewish People is "messy polemic – helter-skelter, tendentious and ill-informed". According to Lazare, Sand "rightly insists on the relevance of the ancient past to contemporary politics, but his distortions are an obstacle to a full understanding of the modern Israeli-Palestinian predicament."

Martin Goodman, professor of Roman and Jewish history, critiqued the book in The Times Literary Supplement as a work built on "misrepresentation" and "invented history," written by a "historian of contemporary European history [...] who patently knows so little" about the subject. He highlights Sand's political objective, which Sand "does not try to disguise": "to undermine the claim of Israeli Jews who come from diaspora communities to have returned to the land from which their people originated," and thereby "help to turn the state of Israel into a more equal democratic society in which the origins of its Jewish and Arab inhabitants are ignored." Goodman challenges Sand's central theses as "implausible," supported by "belligerence" rather than argument, and based on evidence "almost totally ignored" or "incomprehensibly dismissed." On the exile, Goodman cites Josephus and Justin Martyr, asking why "Justin, who came from Palestine and was a sophisticated author in the Greek rhetorical tradition, would lay his argument open to easy refutation" if his claims about Jewish exclusion were false. He rejects Sand's assertion that Jews were considered only a religion, noting that "both pagan and Christian Romans sometimes thought of the Jews as a people,” and that the term natio used in Roman legal and literary texts is "unambiguous." Regarding Sand’s claim that diaspora Jewry resulted from widespread conversion, Goodman writes that "his discussion substitutes belligerence for argument" and that Sand's population estimates are based on "a series of wholly random guesses." He adds that Sand "seems to be totally ignorant of the standard methods of population control, including child exposure, in the pagan Roman Empire," which could help explain Jewish demographic growth. Finally, Goodman writes that while Sand's political concerns may be valid, they cannot be supported by "an appeal to invented history."

Professor Michael Berkowitz from University College London wrote "With a little critical distance, it is possible to criticize this book as a far cry from a ‘real’ work of scholarship. It is flimsy, haphazardly built, slap-dash. There is no foundation in archival research, and Sand does not seem to have fully read (or understood) many of the secondary works on which his thesis relies. He apparently has never heard of Aviel Roshwald and George Mosse, who are among the first names that should spring to mind in any consideration of Jews and nationalism... Perhaps the fundamental problem with this book, which also applies to the above-mentioned works of Goldhagen, Piterberg, and Mayer, is that the thesis runs way ahead of the supposedly dispassionate investigation (despite Sand's protest to the contrary), and therefore the book assumes the character more of a legal brief than a scholarly monograph".

=== As an argument about Jewish identity ===
Writing in The New Republic, literary critic Hillel Halkin calls assertions made in the book "the exact opposite of the truth" and goes on to say that "Believing Jews throughout the ages have never doubted for a moment that they belonged to an am yisra'el, a people of Israel—nor, in modern times, have non-believing Jews with strong Jewish identities. It is precisely this that constitutes such an identity. Far from inventing Jewish peoplehood, Zionism was a modern re-conceptualization of it that was based on its long-standing prior existence." Halkin describes the book as "so intellectually shoddy that once, not very long ago, it would have been flunked as an undergraduate thesis by any self-respecting professor of history."

In contrast, Israeli historian Tom Segev writes that Sand's book "is intended to promote the idea that Israel should be a 'state of all its citizens' – Jews, Arabs and others – in contrast to its declared identity as a 'Jewish and democratic' state." Segev adds that the book includes "numerous facts and insights that many Israelis will be astonished to read for the first time".

British historian Simon Schama, reviewing the book in the Financial Times, argues that Sand misunderstands Jews in the diaspora, specifically, that he thinks that "the Khazars, the central Asian kingdom which, around the 10th century, converted to Judaism have been excised from the master narrative because of the embarrassing implication that present day Jews might be descended from Turkic converts." Schama states that, on the contrary, when he was a child, "the Khazars were known by every Jewish girl and boy in my neck of Golders Greenery and further flung parts of the diaspora, and celebrated rather than evaded." Schama adds that "Sand's sense of grievance against the myths on which the exclusively Jewish right to full Israeli immigration is grounded is one that many who want to see a more liberal and secular Israel wholeheartedly share. But his book prosecutes these aims through a sensationalist assertion that somehow, the truth about Jewish culture and history, especially the 'exile which never happened,' has been suppressed in the interests of racially pure demands of Zionist orthodoxy. This, to put it mildly, is a stretch."

Sand responded to Schama's critique on his website by summarising the methodology Schama had used: "One of the most effective techniques adopted to ridicule or marginalize one’s ideological opponents is to create a caricatured and extreme version of their thesis. Some Zionist historians have become past masters with such methods and Simon Schama seems to want to emulate them in his review of my book."

British historian Max Hastings, in his review for the Sunday Times, writes that the book "represents, at the very least, a formidable polemic against claims that Israel has a moral right to define itself as an explicitly and exclusively Jewish society, in which non-Jews, such as Palestino-Israelis, are culturally and politically marginalised." He adds that Sand "rightly deplores the eagerness of fanatics to insist upon the historical truth of events convenient to modern politics, in defiance of evidence or probability... Yet Sand, whose title is foolishly provocative, displays a lack of compassion for the Jewish predicament." Hastings continues, stating that "It is possible to accept his view that there is no common genetic link either between the world's Jews or to the ancient tribes of Israel, while also trusting the evidence of one's own senses that there are remarkable common Jewish characteristics — indeed, a Jewish genius — that cannot be explained merely by religion." Hastings states that "Sand produces some formidable arguments about what Jews may not be, but he fails to explain what it is they are." Hastings concludes that Sand's book "serves notice on Zionist traditionalists: if an Israeli historian can display such plausible doubts about important aspects of the Israeli legend, any Arabs hostile to the state of Israel can exploit a fertile field indeed."

Steven Weitzman, himself the author of a recent analysis of the topic which dismisses many of the key traditional accounts of Jewish origins, critiques Sand's idea of a deliberate 'invention' of Jewish identity, while arguing that Sand's method has similarities to mainstream scholarship. For Weitzman, Sand has just replaced one origin theory with another, whereas, for Weitzman, the question of Jewish origins is to an extent indeterminate ('unresolvable'). In a follow-up exchange with Shmuel Rosner he adds that his criticism of Sand applies equally to versions of the origin stories produced by the right. Making a comparison already voiced elsewhere, he compares Sand's book to Assaf Voll's A History of the Palestinian People, 122 blank pages, stating Sand's argument is the reverse of Voll's, with the former attempting to disprove Jewish origins, and the latter, doing the same for Palestinians, each undermining an adversary's national claim.

=== As an argument about the position of "Jewish history" in Israeli universities ===
According to Ofri Ilani, historian and Haaretz columnist, most of Sand's book deals with the question of where the Jews come from, rather than questions of modern Jewish nationalism and the modern invention — according to Sand — of the Jewish people." Therefore, some historians of Judaism have stated that Sand is dealing with subjects about which he has no understanding, and that he bases his book on work that he is incapable of reading in the original languages.

Sand admits that he is "a historian of France and Europe, and not of the ancient period…" and that he has "been criticized in Israel for writing about Jewish history when European history is my specialty. But a book like this needed a historian who is familiar with the standard concepts of historical inquiry used by academia in the rest of the world." Sand claims that this cannot be found in university history departments in Israel, because of their putatively isolated nature. This isolation, Sand states, dates to a decision in the 1930s to separate history into two disciplines: general history and Jewish history. Jewish history was assumed to need its own field of study because Jewish experience was considered unique.

"There is no Jewish department of politics or sociology at the universities. Only history is taught this way, and it has allowed specialists in Jewish history to live in a very insular and conservative world where they are not touched by modern developments in historical research."

=== Genetic evidence ===
Sand's book has occasionally been mentioned in the press in the context of studies in Jewish population genetics. This has been the case in June 2010, as the popular press reported on two studies in this field, (Atzmon et al., American Journal of Human Genetics and Beha et al., Nature).

Thus, Newsweek mentions Sand's book as having "revived" debate on the Khazar hypothesis. and the New York Times said the studies "refute the suggestion made last year by the historian Shlomo Sand in his book The Invention of the Jewish People that Jews have no common origin but are a miscellany of people in Europe and Central Asia who converted to Judaism at various times." Michael Balter, reviewing the study in the journal Science, says the following:

… Shlomo Sand of Tel Aviv University in Israel argues in his book The Invention of the Jewish People, translated into English last year, that most modern Jews do not descend from the ancient Land of Israel but from groups that took on Jewish identities long afterward. Nevertheless, the study by Ostrer's group concluded that all three Jewish groups—Middle Eastern, Sephardic, and Ashkenazi—share genomewide genetic markers that distinguish them from other worldwide populations.

Geneticist Harry Ostrer presented findings that were generally viewed as disproving Sand's notion that the Jewish people is an ex-post invention. Ostrer said, "I would hope that these observations would put the idea that Jewishness is just a cultural construct to rest." Balter's article further cites Noah Rosenberg of the University of Michigan, Ann Arbor, as saying that although the study "does not appear to support" the Khazar hypothesis, it "doesn't entirely eliminate it either."

Shlomo Sand has contested the claim that his book has been contradicted by recent genetic research published in Nature journal and the American Journal of Human Genetics. In a new afterword for the paperback edition of The Invention of the Jewish People, Sand writes:

This attempt to justify Zionism through genetics is reminiscent of the procedures of late nineteenth-century anthropologists who very scientifically set out to discover the specific characteristics of Europeans. As of today, no study based on anonymous DNA samples has succeeded in identifying a genetic marker specific to Jews, and it is not likely that any study ever will. It is a bitter irony to see the descendants of Holocaust survivors set out to find a biological Jewish identity: Hitler would certainly have been very pleased! And it is all the more repulsive that this kind of research should be conducted in a state that has waged for years a declared policy of "Judaization of the country" in which even today a Jew is not allowed to marry a non-Jew.

Another study on European Jewish population genetics was published in 2012 (Elhaik et al.). According to his study's conclusions, European Jews derive from Caucasus and Mesopotamian populations, findings which have been disputed by Ostrer and others.

On the publication of Elhaik's study, Haaretz reported comments by Sand, who took Elhaik's paper as a vindication of his ideas and seized the opportunity to criticize again "geneticists looking for Jewish genes", expressing the suspicion that the findings of prior geneticists may have been "adapted" for political reasons. As in historical research so in genetics, he argues: "It is very easy to showcase certain findings while marginalizing others and to present your study as scholarly research."

Some geneticists conducting studies in Jewish genetics have challenged Elhaik's methods. Michael Hammer, a geneticist at the University of Arizona, called one of Elhaik's underlying assumptions "unrealistic", reasoning that Armenians have Middle Eastern roots, which, he says, is why they appeared to be genetically related to Ashkenazi Jews in Elhaik's study. He described Elhaik and other proponents of the Khazarian hypothesis as "outlier folks ... who have a minority view that's not supported scientifically."

Marcus Feldman, a geneticist at Stanford University and director of its Morrison Institute for Population and Resource Studies, agrees: "If you take all of the careful genetic population analysis that has been done over the last 15 years, ... there's no doubt about the common Middle Eastern origin" of the Jewish people. Feldman added that Elhaik "appears to be applying the statistics in a way that gives him different results from what everybody else has obtained from essentially similar data.”

Dan Graur, professor of molecular evolution at the University of Houston and Elhaik's doctoral supervisor, called Elhaik's conclusion that Ashkenazi Jews originated in the Caucasus region and not the Middle East "a very honest estimate" and said Elhaik "writes more provocatively than may be needed, but it's his style."

The overwhelming majority of genetic studies on the Jewish diaspora have not confirmed the Khazar myth and have instead identified a common origin in the Middle East.

=== Prizes and accolades ===
In France, the book received the Prix Aujourd'hui, a long-standing journalists' literary award given annually to a non-fiction political or historical work.

== See also ==
- Ethnogenesis
