= Compositional domain =

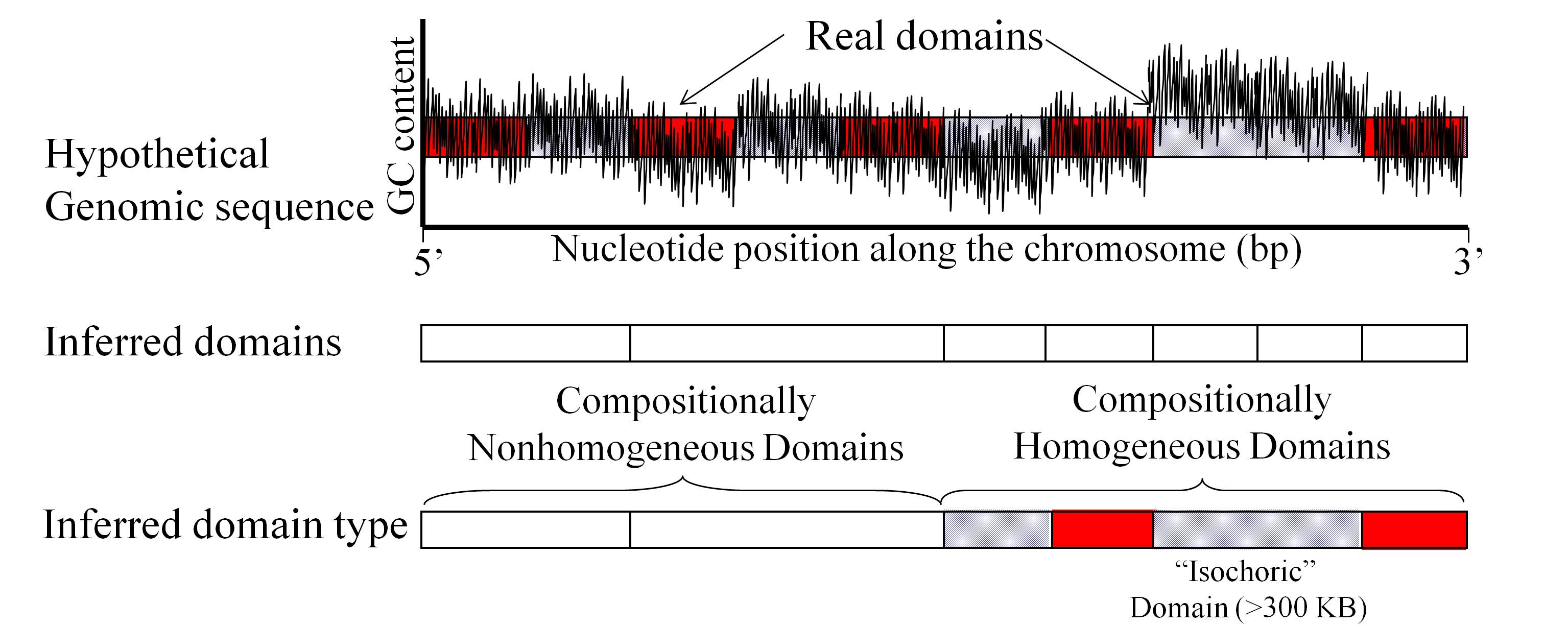
Example of a hypothetical genomic sequence composed of 9 compositionally homogeneous domains used to demonstrate the model. The segmentation algorithm partitioned the sequence and correctly identified 4 domains as compositionally homogeneous domains and 2 compositionally nonhomogeneous domains.

A compositional domain in genetics is a region of DNA with a distinct guanine (G) and cytosine (C) G-C and C-G content (collectively GC content). The homogeneity of compositional domains is compared to that of the chromosome on which they reside. As such, compositional domains can be homogeneous or nonhomogeneous domains. Compositionally homogeneous domains that are sufficiently long (= 300 kb) are termed isochores or isochoric domains.

The compositional domain model was proposed as an alternative to the isochoric model. The isochore model was proposed by Bernardi and colleagues to explain the observed non-uniformity of genomic fragments in the genome. However, recent sequencing of complete genomic data refuted the isochoric model. Its main predictions were:

- GC content of the third codon position (GC3) of protein coding genes is correlated with the GC content of the isochores embedding the corresponding genes. This prediction was found to be incorrect. GC3 could not predict the GC content of nearby sequences.
- The genome organization of warm-blooded vertebrates is a mosaic of isochores. This prediction was rejected by many studies that used the complete human genome data.
- The genome organization of cold-blooded vertebrates is characterized by low GC content levels and lower compositional heterogeneity. This prediction was disproved by finding high and low GC content domains in fish genomes.

The compositional domain model describes the genome as a mosaic of short and long homogeneous and nonhomogeneous domains. The composition and organization of the domains were shaped by different evolutionary processes that either fused or broke down the domains. This genomic organization model was confirmed in many new genomic studies of cow, honeybee, sea urchin, body louse, Nasonia, beetle, and ant genomes. The human genome was described as consisting of a mixture of compositionally nonhomogeneous domains with numerous short compositionally homogeneous domains and relatively few long ones.
