= Abraham Polak =

Israeli historian (1910–1970)

Abraham Nahum Polak (Hebrew: אברהם פולק)(sometimes referred to as A. N. Polak or Poliak; born 2 September 1910, died 5 March 1970) was a Jewish historian, a professor at the Tel Aviv University since its inception, professor of medieval history and founder of the department of Middle Eastern History. His main areas of research were Jewish history, Arab history, nations of Islam and Africa and the history of the Khazars.

== Biography ==
=== Early years and education ===
Polak was born in Ochakiv, a small city in the southern part of the Russian Empire. There is little information on his early years or his family. In 1923 he emigrated to Palestine with his mother, Miriam Mindel (born Serebreni) and his elder brother, Menashe Polak. The family settled in the city of Haifa where Polak also attended high-school between the years 1924–1929 at the Hebrew Reali School.

In 1930 Polak moved to Jerusalem where he studied at the Hebrew University. Between 1930 and 1931 he also studied Biblical History at the École Biblique in Jerusalem. Even as a student, Polak published numerous articles in the daily newspaper Davar, such as: "Israel Under the Crusaders Rule", "How the Land of Israel was Abandoned", "National Minorities in Iraq and The New Arab Literature".

In 1934 he received his MA in "Culture of Islam" and went on to write his thesis on the subject of the History of Land Relationships in Egypt, Syria and Palestine during the late Middle Ages and in Modern Times, under the guidance of Professor Leo Aryeh Mayer. He was awarded his PhD in 1936.

=== Publications home and abroad ===
Research articles by Polak often appeared in foreign publications. The first - "National Revolutions in Egypt at the times of the Mamluks and their Economic Causes", was published in 1934 in the Parisian magazine Revue des Études Islamiques and by 1938 three more articles by him were published there. In 1937 he also became a member of the Royal Asiatic Society in London and in 1939 he received the society's award for his research on Feudalism in the Middle East, which later that year was published in London as a book. In their decision, members of the award committee noted that "Dr. Poliak has set out to write a concise account of the feudal systems in Egypt, Syria, Palestine and the Lebanon...This monograph is of great interest and is full of interesting suggestions and notes."

In 1941 Polak published the article "The Khazars' Conversion to Judaism". Up until then, the culture of the Khazars was outside the scope of Polak's research but evidently, this article led him to delve deeper into this topic and in 1943 he published his book Khazaria: History of a Jewish Kingdom in Europe. In his book, Polak asserted that the Khazars were the demographic foundation of the Jews who inhabited Eastern Europe in the late Middle Ages and who later evolved into the Ashkenazi Jewry. For this book, Polak was awarded in 1943 the Bialik Prize for Jewish Thought by the city of Tel Aviv. The book was said to be of "...great historic value...which sheds new light on the obscure subject of the Khazars' Kingdom and is important to the history of the Jews and the country".

=== IDF service and further research ===
Following the formation of the State of Israel in 1948, Polak was enlisted to the IDF and began his service in the Cultural Services Unit, which later became part of the Education and Youth Corp. For 10 years he was "Chief Writer" in the Educational Publications Section and retired in 1959 with the rank of Major. His superiors described Polak in various evaluations as being "...highly educated and with vast knowledge..." (1952), "an extraordinary man with special skills and talents" (1958), "...a remarkable person in many aspects and one who can not be defined in conventional terms, he possesses a deep intellect and amazing analytical capabilities" (1959). All throughout his service, Polak continued to publish numerous books within the IDF publishing center, such as: Geopolitics of Israel and the Middle East, The Naval Potential of the Arab States, The Struggle for the Road to Jerusalem, Founding the State of Israel, Security Forces in the Judea Region, and many more. In 1955 he was awarded the Kugel Award for Literary and Scientific Work by the city of Holon for his book The Bible and the National Social Movements.

=== Academic work and international ties ===
In 1955, while still an officer in the IDF, Polak began giving lectures at the University Institute for Israeli Culture, which a year later was the core of the Humanities Department in the newly forming Tel Aviv University. Between 1961 and 1966 Polak served as professor of history of the Middle Ages and founded and directed the Department of Middle-Eastern Studies. Later on, he also taught in the Department of Developing Countries and devoted his research to the history of Jews, Arabs and other Muslim and African nations.

Polak kept extensive connections with international organizations and was regularly invited to participate in professional conferences all over the world, such as: the International Congress of Historians (Stockholm 1960), International Congress of Orientalists (Brussels 1938, Moscow 1960, New Delhi 1964), the Parliament of the World's Religions (Calcutta 1964) and in numerous events of the World Congress of Jewish Studies (Jerusalem 1947, 1957, 1961, 1965, 1969). Polak was also a member of the International African Institute (IAI) in London.

== Death ==
Polak died in his home in Tel Aviv on March 5, 1970, at the age of 59. He is buried in Holon Cemetery.

== Personal life ==
Polak never married or had children.

== Polak and the Khazars ==
To this date, Polak is renowned mainly due to his book on the history of the Khazars, although his vast research before and after the publication of this book was devoted to other areas of interest. Late in his life, Polak was to refer to the issue of the Khazars only once again, when in 1969 he gave a speech on that topic at the World Congress of Jewish Studies in Jerusalem.

His book Khazaria: History of a Jewish Kingdom in Europe was groundbreaking, not only due to the comprehensive approach to the issue of the Khazars, but specifically because, for the first time, Islamic sources were used. These sources were essentially unknown to researchers in the west and were uncovered by Polak through his work which was based on Arab, Persian and Kurd authors.

In his book, Polak presented two important albeit controversial assumptions: the first was consideration of a non-Middle-Eastern origin for most of the Eastern-European Jews; the second was maintaining that Yiddish was born in Crimea and not in Germany, as was previously believed.

Initially, the book was well received. The literary critic B. Lobotzki of HaMashkif newspaper, wrote:

"The Bialik Institute has given us now the important book about Khazaria. It addresses the issue which everyone knows had a major influence on the formation of Polish and Eastern-European Jewry, but not many took the trouble to assemble the few surviving sources, to pursue them for many years until, behind the fog of myths and forgeries, the true character of the Khazars' Kingdom comes to light. Professor Polak made this happen, and did so diligently and thoroughly. The book itself, and the bibliography attached to it, prove the extent of undertaking by the author, who did not neglect any source, and with a unique sense of history knew to find the criterion in which to distinguish between truth and a lie, between fiction and fact, between tradition and folklore".

The Palestine Post book review asserted:

"This is the first attempt in any language to introduce the history of the Khazars' Kingdom...a methodical examination of first-hand sources allowed the author to determine that the Khazars' Kingdom collapsed in 1239 and even to conclude that until its downfall, it was a powerful and independent state".

Even Salo Wittmayer Baron and Ben-Zion Dinur, two of the leading Jewish historians in those years, accepted Polak's fundamental assumptions. Prof. Baron declared that "...from Khazaria Jews began to penetrate into the vast plains of Eastern-Europe. This migration occurred both during the peak of the Khazars' Kingdom and during its decline". Prof. Dinur did not hesitate to confirm that Khazaria was "the origin of one of the greatest diasporas, the diaspora of Russia, Lithuania and Poland".

Nonetheless, these same assumptions which Polak presented in his book, were the target of criticism in various circles because of their possible ramifications on the right of Jews to settle in Israel. As early as 1944, the Jewish historian Aharon Zeev Eshkoli asserted: "I do not know what enjoyment and dignity he finds in our Turkish-Mongolian descent rather than our Jewish ancestry".

Polak's book on Khazaria was only published in three editions - in 1943, in 1944 (including correction of mistakes) and in 1951 with a supplement on the origin of the Yiddish language, also written by Polak.

After his death, Polak's work has gradually faded from public awareness and his book Khazaria was not printed again in Israel, although since its publication it was quoted in almost every major research on the Khazars worldwide.

The first translation of his book was published in 2015 in the Polish language. For the first time, a biography of Polak was written and a complete bibliography of his books and articles was assembled.

With the development of modern research, the fall of the Khazar kingdom has been dated to between the end of the 10th century and the beginning of the 11th century, i.e. around 250 years before the arrival of the Mongols, by the Kievan Rus' and the nomadic Cuman tribes. From this point on, the Khazars ceased to be an independent kingdom and their traces disappeared from history. The few references a few years after the conquest speak of the Khazars converting to Islam. In light of this, a significant part of Polak's research assumptions that attribute the fall of the kingdom, and its (allegedly) subsequent "mass migration" from it, to the Mongol invasion, are not accepted today. The modern interpretation is that Khazars' descendants continued to live in their former lands until the Mongol invasion destroyed irrigation networks, which then forced them to migrate eastward.

== Selected works ==
=== Books ===
- Feudalism in Egypt, Syria, Palestine, and the Lebanon 1250-1900; London 1939
- Toldot hayachasim hakarkaim beMitsrayim, Suria ve Eretz Israel be-sof Yemei HaBeynayim vebazman hachadash [The History of Land Relationships in Egypt, Syria and Israel During the Late Middle Ages and in Modern Times]; Jerusalem 1940
- Khazaria - Toldot mamlacha Yehudit BeEropa [Khazaria: History of a Jewish Kingdom in Europe]; Tel Aviv 1943, 1944 (corrected edition), 1951 (corrected edition)
- Divrei yemei haAravim mishachar kiyumenu vead ledoroteinu [History of the Arabs from the Dawn of Our Existence Until Our Times]; Jerusalem 1945
- Yehudei Polin beEretz Israel [Polish Jews in Israel]; Jerusalem 1947
- Geopolitika shel Yisrael veHamizrach Hatichon [Geopolitics of Israel and the Middle East]; Tel Aviv 1950
- HaTanach vehatnuot hasotsialiot ba'amim [The Bible and the National Social Movements]; Tel Aviv 1954
- BeKom Medinat Israel [Founding the State of Israel]; Tel Aviv 1955
- Eretz Israel BeYemei HaShilton HaParsi [Israel in Persian Times]; Tel Aviv 1956
- Yahadut Bavel [The Babylonian Jewry]; Tel Aviv 1959
- Yahadut Sefarad [The Sephardic Jewry]; Tel Aviv 1960

=== Articles ===
- "Tachat shilton haTsalbanim beEretz Israel" [Israel under the Crusaders Rule]; Davar 1930
- "Les révoltes populaires en Égypte á l’epoque des mamelouks et leurs causes économiques"; Revue des Études Islamiques 1934
- "La féodalité islamique"; Revue des Études Islamiques 1936
- "Some Notes on the Feudal System of the Mamluks"; The Journal of the Royal Asiatic Society of Great Britain and Ireland 1937
- "Yehudei haMizrach haTichon besof yemei haBeinayim (lefi mekorot Aravim)" [The Jews of the Middle-East at the End of the Middle-Ages (according to Arab sources)]; Zion 1937
- "Agrarian Problems in the Middle East"; Palestine and Middle East 1938
- "Classification of Lands in the Islamic Law and itsTechnical Terms"; American Journal of Semitic Languages and Literatures 1940
- "Hitgayrut haKuzarim" [The Khazars' Conversion to Judaism]; Zion 1941
- "The Influence of Chingiz-Khan’s Yasa upon the General Organization of the Mamluk State"; Bulletin of the School of Oriental Studies 1942
- "The Dead Sea Scrolls: A New Approach"; The Jewish Quarterly Review 1958
- "HaYesod HaYehudi she-be-Arviyei Ertz Israel" [The Jewish Element in Israeli Arabs]; Molad 1965
