= Harry Ostrer =

Jewish American geneticist

- Born: May 15, 1951 (age 75)
- Education: Massachusetts Institute of Technology, Columbia University (M.D. 1976), Johns Hopkins University, National Institutes of Health
- Known for: Genetic basis of disorders
- Scientific career
- Fields: Medical genetics, pediatrics
- Workplaces: New York University School of Medicine; Albert Einstein College of Medicine at Yeshiva University; Howard Hughes Medical Institute; Khao-I-Dang Holding Center, Thailand; Johns Hopkins University; University of Florida College of Medicine

Harry Ostrer is an American physician, medical geneticist, molecular pathologist, and academic. He is Professor of Pathology and Pediatrics at the Albert Einstein College of Medicine and a consultant in cancer genetics at the Albert Einstein Cancer Center. His research has focused on human genetics, the molecular basis of sex determination and disorders of sex development, cancer genomics, genetic epidemiology, Jewish population genetics, and molecular diagnostics. Ostrer has also contributed to the development of clinical genetic testing and precision oncology.

== Education ==
Ostrer was born in Boston, Massachusetts. He earned a Bachelor of Science in physics from the Massachusetts Institute of Technology in 1972 and received his M.D. from the Columbia University Vagelos College of Physicians and Surgeons in 1976.

He completed a residency in pediatrics at Johns Hopkins Hospital between 1976 and 1978, followed by a clinical associateship in molecular genetics and protein chemistry at the National Institutes of Health from 1978 to 1981. He subsequently undertook a fellowship in medical genetics at Johns Hopkins University School of Medicine, completing his postdoctoral training in 1984.

== Career ==
Ostrer began his academic career as a research associate in the Howard Hughes Laboratory for Human Biochemical Genetics at Johns Hopkins University School of Medicine in 1983. In 1984, he joined the University of Florida College of Medicine as assistant professor of pediatrics and later held a concurrent appointment in biochemistry and molecular biology. He was promoted to associate professor of pediatrics, immunology, and medical microbiology in 1989 and directed the R. C. Philips Research and Education Unit.

In 1990, Ostrer joined the New York University School of Medicine, where he established and directed the Human Genetics Program. He served as associate professor until 2001, when he was promoted to professor of pediatrics, pathology, and medicine. During his tenure at NYU, he founded the New York Cancer Project in 1998, was a member of the Kaplan Comprehensive Cancer Center, and served as associate director for genetic epidemiology of the Clinical and Translational Science Institute from 2009 to 2011.

Since 2011, Ostrer has been Professor of Pathology and Pediatrics at the Albert Einstein College of Medicine. He served as Director of Genetic and Genomic Testing at Montefiore Medical Center from 2011 to 2015 and has continued as a consultant in cancer genetics for the Albert Einstein Cancer Center. He has overseen the introduction of numerous molecular diagnostic tests into clinical practice and has directed clinical genetics and molecular pathology laboratories.

Ostrer has served on advisory committees and review panels for the National Institutes of Health, the National Cancer Institute, the American Society of Human Genetics, and the American College of Medical Genetics and Genomics. He has chaired multiple review panels for the U.S. Department of Defense Prostate Cancer Research Program and has served on editorial boards of journals including Clinical Genetics and the Journal of Clinical Endocrinology & Metabolism. He was elected to the Board of Directors of the American College of Medical Genetics and Genomics Foundation in 2025 and is set to become the Foundation’s President-Elect in 2026. He is also a member of the Government and Public Advocacy Committee of the American Society of Human Genetics and of the newly organized New York State Rare Disease Advisory Council.

=== Myriad Genetics litigation and genetic-discrimination advocacy ===
In 2013, Ostrer was the sole remaining individual plaintiff with standing in Association for Molecular Pathology v. Myriad Genetics, Inc., after Myriad Genetics directed him to stop performing clinical testing for mutations in the BRCA1 and BRCA2 genes on the grounds that the testing infringed the company’s gene patents. A federal district court initially ruled in the plaintiffs’ favor under the "products of nature" doctrine; that ruling was reversed on appeal before the U.S. Supreme Court held unanimously that isolated human genes are not patentable, invalidating Myriad’s composition-of-matter claims. Ostrer subsequently wrote that the ruling was one of three landmark Supreme Court decisions since 2010 giving inventors broader access to natural products, laws of nature, and abstract ideas. As a grantee of the National Human Genome Research Institute, he also studied the impact of genetic testing on health, life, and disability insurance, and, as a member of the New York State Bar Association, worked to help pass and implement state legislation intended to prevent genetic discrimination in insurance and employment and to promote informed consent for genetic testing in New York.

== Research ==
Ostrer's research spans medical genetics, cancer genomics, molecular pathology, human population genetics, and genomic medicine. His work has combined laboratory research with the development of clinical genetic testing, contributing to the application of genomic technologies in precision medicine.

=== Molecular mechanisms of classical genetic disorders ===
Much of Ostrer’s early research examined the molecular basis of “classical” genetic conditions, with the goal of identifying causal genes and their mechanisms of pathogenesis. During his NIH fellowship, he contributed to work showing that a splicing mutation in the beta-E-globin gene explains the mild β-thalassemia phenotype associated with hemoglobin E. He subsequently described mutations in the X-linked cone opsin genes that cause color vision deficiencies by disrupting protein folding and stability.With colleagues at the University of Florida, he also showed that the chromosome 15 deletion causing Angelman syndrome is preferentially of maternal origin, among the earliest demonstrations of a role for genomic imprinting in a human genetic disease. That finding led him to explore non-Mendelian patterns of inheritance more broadly, the subject of his 1998 book Non-Mendelian Genetics in Humans.

=== Molecular genetics of sex determination and disorders of sex development ===
Beginning during his postdoctoral and fellowship training in the 1980s, Ostrer has studied the molecular basis of human sex determination and disorders of sex development (DSD). With Robert Dubin, he showed that the Y-chromosome gene SRY functions as a transcriptional activator, work that helped establish how SRY triggers testis development and how its disruption produces 46,XY sex reversal. Decades later, with Alan Pearlman, Johnny Loke, and other collaborators, he demonstrated that gain-of-function mutations in MAP3K1 cause 46,XY disorders of sex development, implicating the MAP kinase signal transduction pathway in human testis determination and identifying a mechanism of DSD distinct from the loss-of-function mutations found in previously known sex-determining genes. Subsequent studies from his group mapped how specific MAP3K1 variants disrupt distinct structural domains of the protein and expanded the clinical case series for MAP3K1-related gonadal dysgenesis. Ostrer also authored the GeneReviews clinical reference chapter on 46,XY disorders of sex development and 46,XY complete gonadal dysgenesis, a resource used by clinicians evaluating patients with atypical sexual differentiation, and this body of work is often cited among his most influential scientific contributions.

His research on Jewish genetics was praised by other geneticists as innovative. Oster has stressed that his work is not intended to create a hierarchy in human society or support eugenic aims, and he seeks to understand genetic differences without promoting discrimination. His work is intended to connect with heritage through genetic research and foster group identity and pride among Jewish people for their long history. Although his research reveals distinctive markers in Jewish populations, he points out that DNA does not replace traditional religious definitions of Jewishness. Ostrer's work was released around the same time as Behar's and had similar results.

=== Functional genomics and variant pathogenicity ===
Ostrer, together with Johnny Loke, developed a suite of flow variant assays (FVAs) — flow-cytometry-based methods for testing the functional consequences of genetic variants on protein abundance, phosphorylation, and protein-protein and protein-nucleic acid interactions in circulating and transfected cells. These assays were used to establish the pathogenicity of variants in MAP3K1 and other genes in the sex-determination pathway, including through the creation of molecular phenocopies by modulating candidate sex-determining genes. Ostrer’s group extended the FVA approach to the DNA damage response, developing functional variant analyses that predict pathogenicity of variants in the BRCA1 double-strand break repair pathway and, subsequently, in DNA mismatch repair genes associated with Lynch syndrome. This functional genomics work, intended to complement DNA sequencing with direct variant-level evidence of pathogenicity, has been protected by several U.S. patents and underlies germline cancer-risk tests that Ostrer has helped bring into clinical use.

Ostrer has also studied the genetic epidemiology of prostate cancer, participating in international consortia such as PRACTICAL (Prostate Cancer Association Group to Investigate Cancer-Associated Alterations in the Genome). This collaborative work has contributed to genome-wide association studies identifying genetic variants associated with inherited prostate cancer risk, which have been incorporated into polygenic risk scores used for risk stratification.

Ostrer has also conducted research on the genomic basis of cancer metastasis. Together with collaborators, he developed genomic signatures based on patterns of copy-number alterations that predict the likelihood of metastatic progression in prostate cancer and later extended these approaches to breast, lung, and other cancers. His work has contributed to the development of metastasis prediction models intended to improve prognosis and guide treatment decisions within precision oncology.

Another major focus of his research has been radiogenomics, the study of genetic factors that influence individual responses to radiation therapy. He helped pioneer the use of genome-wide association studies to identify genetic variants associated with severe normal tissue toxicity following radiotherapy for prostate cancer. This work contributed to the establishment of the Radiogenomics Consortium, an international research network that investigates genetic predictors of radiation toxicity and treatment outcomes across multiple cancer types.

In addition to cancer genetics, Ostrer has made contributions to human population genetics, particularly the genetics of Jewish populations. His studies have examined the ancestry, demographic history, and genetic diversity of Jewish communities, as well as the relationship between genetics, ethnicity, and identity. This research has informed both medical genetics and the broader understanding of human population history. This work, including a 2012 study of North African Jewish populations, is discussed in his 2012 book Legacy: A Genetic History of the Jewish People. This population-genetics work also extended to identifying founder mutations and other population-prevalent genetic variants underlying heritable susceptibility to breast, ovarian, and colon cancer among Ashkenazi Jews.

== Publications ==
=== Selected books ===
Ostrer is the sole author of Legacy: A Genetic History of the Jewish People (Oxford University Press, 2012) and of Non-Mendelian Genetics in Humans (Oxford University Press, 1998), a monograph in the Oxford Monographs on Medical Genetics series examining gonadal and somatic mosaicism, mitochondrial inheritance, genomic imprinting, and other exceptions to Mendelian transmission in humans. He also contributed to Essentials of Medical Genomics (2nd ed., Wiley, 2008), edited by Stuart M. Brown and John A. Hay.

=== Science writing and public engagement ===
He has contributed opinion pieces to The Forward, including a 2017 essay criticizing the use of the Khazar hypothesis to challenge Jewish genetic ancestry claims, and a 2018 post for the Oxford University Press blog on the value and history of human population genetics. He has written book reviews for the Journal of Clinical Investigation, including of Keith Wailoo and Stephen Pemberton’s The Troubled Dream of Genetic Medicine (2006) and Michael Sandel’s The Case Against Perfection: Ethics in the Age of Genetic Engineering (2007), and a book review for the New England Journal of Medicine (2008). Following the Myriad Genetics decision, he wrote a correspondence piece for Nature on the implications of recent U.S. patent rulings (2013), and in 2026 he authored a JAMA Viewpoint on reorganizing pediatric genetic care. Since 2025, he has also written Notes from a Geneticist, a Substack newsletter covering medical genetics, health advocacy, and healthy aging.

== Honors and recognition ==
Among Ostrer's honors are the Weizmann Institute of Science Award for Excellence (2005), the Henry W. Shotmeyer Award from the Skin Cancer Foundation (1998), and the March of Dimes Basil O'Connor Starter Award (1985). In 2010, he was named to the Forward newspaper's "Forward 50" list recognizing influential Jewish Americans.

== Reception ==
Ostrer’s population-genetics research has drawn both endorsement and criticism. Geneticist Sarah Tishkoff said his findings, together with a contemporaneous study by Doron Behar, demonstrated a shared genetic ancestry among most Jewish populations. Geneticist Eran Elhaik challenged Ostrer’s conclusions and instead argued for a Khazar-hypothesis origin of Ashkenazi ancestry; Ostrer and other researchers responded that Elhaik’s method was not well suited to populations with mixed or ancient ancestry.Pediatrician Catherine DeAngelis criticized Ostrer’s requirement that researchers using his data not use it in ways that could defame Jews, calling the condition unusual.

=== Portrayals in books ===
Ostrer’s role in the Myriad Genetics litigation is chronicled in Jorge L. Contreras’s The Genome Defense: Inside the Epic Legal Battle to Determine Who Owns Your DNA (Algonquin Books, 2021), a narrative history of Association for Molecular Pathology v. Myriad Genetics drawn from interviews with the case’s lawyers, scientists, and plaintiffs. His research on Jewish population genetics is also featured in Jeff Wheelwright’s The Wandering Gene and the Indian Princess: Race, Religion, and DNA (W. W. Norton, 2012), which follows a Hispano family in Colorado’s San Luis Valley whose members carry the BRCA1.185delAG mutation and traces the mutation’s Sephardic Jewish origins through Ostrer’s and other researchers’ work.

== See also ==
- Genetic studies of Jews
- Race and genetics

== External links to Ostrer projects ==
- Jewish Hapmap Project
- Genetics of Sex Determination
