= Dan Graur =

American scientist (born 1953)

- Born: July 24, 1953 (age 73); Piatra Neamț, Romania
- Education: Tel Aviv University; University of Texas Health Science Center at Houston
- Scientific career
- Fields: molecular evolution genome evolution
- Workplaces: University of Houston; Tel Aviv University; University of Tübingen
- Thesis: Studies on the Patterns of Nucleotide and Amino Acid Substitution (1985)
- Doctoral advisor: Masatoshi Nei
- Website: nsm.uh.edu/~dgraur

Dan Graur \ˈɡra.ur\ (born July 24, 1953, in Piatra Neamț) is a Romanian-American scientist working in the field of molecular evolution. He is a Moores Professor at the University of Houston and Professor Emeritus of Zoology at Tel Aviv University, Israel. He is coauthor along with Wen-Hsiung Li of Fundamentals of Molecular Evolution. His Molecular and Genome Evolution was published in 2016.

== Education ==
Dan Graur earned a B.Sc. in biology and an M.Sc. in Zoology from Tel Aviv University. In 1985 Graur received his Ph.D. at the University of Texas Health Science Center at Houston for research supervised by Masatoshi Nei. He conducted postdoctoral research at the University of Tübingen, Germany.

== Career ==
From 1986 to 2003 he worked in the Department of Zoology at Tel Aviv University. He retired in 2006 as Norman and Rose Lederer Professor Emeritus of Zoology. In 2003, he moved to the University of Houston. From 2009 to 2011 he has held the position of Councillor for the Society for Molecular Biology and Evolution. Graur has been noted for his criticisms of the ENCODE project.

== Awards and honors ==
In 2011 Graur was awarded the Humboldt Prize. In 2015, he was elected fellow of the American Association for the Advancement of Science.
