= Demographics of Cardiff =

Population study of Cardiff, Wales

- Population pyramid of Cardiff
- Population: 361,468 (2016 estimate)

This article presents the historical demographics of Cardiff, capital city of Wales in the United Kingdom.

== Population ==
Following a period of decline during the 1970s and 1980s, Cardiff's population is growing. The local authority area had an estimated population of more than 324,800 in 2008, compared to a 2001 Census figure of 305,353. Between mid-2007 and mid-2008, Cardiff was the fastest-growing local authority in Wales with population growth rate of 1.2%. According to Census 2001 data, Cardiff was the 14th largest settlement in the United Kingdom, and the 21st largest urban area. The Cardiff Larger Urban Zone (a Eurostat definition including the Vale of Glamorgan and a number of local authorities in the Valleys) has 841,600 people, the 10th largest LUZ in the UK. The Cardiff and South Wales Valleys metropolitan area has a population of nearly 1.1 million people.

Official estimates derived from the census regarding the city's total population have been disputed. The city council has published two articles that argue the 2001 census seriously under reports the population of Cardiff and, in particular, the ethnic minority population of some inner city areas.

The Welsh Government's official 2016 mid year estimate of the population of the Cardiff local authority was 361,468.

Year	Population of Cardiff	Change
1801	6,342	-
1851	26,630	320%
1861	48,965	184%
1871	71,301	84%
1881	93,637	31%
1891	142,114	52%
1901	172,629	21%
1911	209,804	22%
1921	227,753	9%
1931	247,270	9%
1941	257,112	4%
1951	267,356	4%
1961	278,552	4%
1971	290,227	4%
1981	274,500	-5%
1991	272,557	-1%
2001	292,150	7%
2007	321,000*	10%
2008	324,800†	1%
source: Vision of Britain except *, which is estimated by the Office for National Statistics, and † which is estimated by National Statistics for Wales. Historical populations are calculated with the modern boundaries		

== Ethnicity ==
Population pyramid of Cardiff by ethnicity in 2021

Ethnic makeup of Cardiff by single year ages in 2021

Cardiff has an ethnically diverse population due to its past trading connections, post-war immigration and the large numbers of foreign students who attend university in the city. The ethnic make-up of Cardiff's population at the time of the 2001 census was: 91.6% white, 2% mixed race, 4% South Asian, 1.3% black, 1.2% other ethnic groups. According to a report published in 2005, over 30,000 people from an ethnic minority live in Cardiff, around 8.4% of the city's total — many of these communities live in Butetown, where ethnic minorities make up around a third of the total population. This diversity, and especially that of the city's long-established African and Arab communities, has been celebrated in a number of cultural exhibitions and events, along with a number of books which have been published on this subject.

Ethnic group	Year									
Ethnic group	1950 estimations		1991		2001		2011		2021	
Ethnic group	Population	%	Population	%	Population	%	Population	%	Population	%
White: Total	262,356	98.1%	261,889	93.8%	279,624	91.6%	293,114	84.7%	286,931	79.2%
White: British	–	–	–	–	269,693	88.3%	277,798	80.3%	266,533	73.6%
White: Irish	–	–	–	–	2,734	0.9%	2,547	0.7%	2,335	0.6%
White: Irish Traveller/White Gypsy (Note: New category created for the 2011 census)	–	–	–	–	–	–	521	0.1%	673	0.2%
White: Roma	–	–	–	–	–	–	–	–	593	0.2%
White: Other	–	–	–	–	7,197	2.4%	12,248	3.5%	16,797	4.6%
Asian or Asian British: Total	–	–	9,247	3.3%	13,924	4.5%	27,885	8%	34,983	9.7%
Asian or Asian British: Indian	–	–	2,704	1.0%	3,829	1.3%	7,886	2.3%	8,837	2.4%
Asian or Asian British: Pakistani	–	–	2,679	1.0%	4,264	1.4%	6,354	1.8%	8,615	2.4%
Asian or Asian British: Bangladeshi	–	–	1,639	0.6%	2,546	0.8%	4,838	1.4%	6,887	1.9%
Asian or Asian British: Chinese (Note: In 2001, listed under the 'Chinese or other ethnic group' heading.)	–	–	1,099	0.4%	1,844	0.6%	4,168	1.2%	5,017	1.4%
Asian or Asian British: Asian Other	–	–	1,126	0.4%	1,441	0.5%	4,639	1.3%	5,627	1.6%
Black or Black British: Total	–	–	5,184	1.8%	3,898	1.3%	8,201	2.3%	13,896	3.8%
Black or Black British: African	–	–	1,730	0.6%	2,189	0.7%	5,213	1.5%	10,587	2.9%
Black or Black British: Caribbean	–	–	1,827	0.7%	1,330	0.4%	1,322	0.4%	1,350	0.4%
Black or Black British: Other	–	–	1,627	0.6%	379	0.1%	1,666	0.5%	1,959	0.5%
British Mixed: Total	–	–	–	–	6,084	2%	10,031	2.9%	14,506	4%
Mixed: White and Caribbean	–	–	–	–	2,428	0.8%	3,641	1.1%	4,299	1.2%
Mixed: White and African	–	–	–	–	1,035	0.3%	1,742	0.5%	2,611	0.7%
Mixed: White and Asian	–	–	–	–	1,302	0.4%	2,459	0.7%	3,572	1.0%
Mixed: Other Mixed	–	–	–	–	1,319	0.4%	2,189	0.6%	4,024	1.1%
Other: Total	–	–	2,735	1%	1,823	0.6%	6,859	2%	11,994	3.3%
Other: Arab (Note: New category created for the 2011 census)	–	–	–	–	–	–	4,707	1.3%	6,624	1.8%
Other: Any other ethnic group	–	–	2,735	1%	1,823	0.6%	2,152	0.6%	5,370	1.5%
Ethnic minority: Total	5,000	1.9%	17,166	6.2%	25,729	8.4%	52,976	15.3%	75,379	20.8%
Total:	267,356	100%	279,055	100%	305,353	100%	346,090	100%	362,310	100%

== Language ==
Cardiff has a chequered linguistic history with Welsh, English, Latin, Norse and Anglo-Norman preponderant at different times. Welsh was the majority language in Cardiff from the 13th century until the city's explosive growth in the Victorian era. Traditionally the Welsh dialect spoken in Cardiff is Gwenhwyseg.

As late as 1850, five of the twelve Anglican churches within the current city boundaries conducted their services exclusively in the Welsh language, while only two worshipped exclusively in English. By 1891, the percentage of Welsh speakers had dropped to 27.9% and only Lisvane, Llanedeyrn and Creigiau remained as majority Welsh-speaking communities. The Welsh language became grouped around a small cluster of chapels and churches, the most notable of which is Tabernacl in the city centre, one of four UK churches chosen to hold official services to commemorate the new millennium. Following the establishment of the city's first Welsh School (Ysgol Gymraeg Bryntaf) in the 1950s, Welsh has slowly regained some ground. Aided by Welsh-medium education and migration from other parts of Wales, the number of Welsh speakers in Cardiff rose by 14,451 between 1991 and 2001; Welsh is now spoken by 11% of Cardiffians. The highest percentage of Welsh speakers is in Pentyrch, where 15.9% of the population speak the language.

In addition to English and Welsh, the diversity of Cardiff's population (including foreign students) means that a large number of languages are spoken within the city. One study has found that Cardiff has speakers of at least 94 languages, with Somali, Urdu, Bengali and Arabic being the most commonly spoken foreign languages.

The modern Cardiff accent is distinct from that of the nearby South Wales Valleys. It is marked primarily by:

- The substitution of /ɪə/ by [øː] For example, here /hɪə/ is pronounced [jøː] in the broader form
- A more open pronunciation of /ʌ/, as in love and other
- /æ/ is widely realised as [a], giving a pronunciation of Cardiff [ˈkaːdɪf] as Kaadiff [ˈkæːdɪf]

Language schools

Owing to its diversity, large student population, and convenient size and location, Cardiff has seen a rise in the number of people coming to the city to learn English. Foreign students are a common sight on the streets of Cardiff with a large percentage coming from Arabic and other European countries. The British Council has an office in the city centre and there are six accredited schools in the area.

== Identity ==
At the 2011 census, there were the following national identities:

- Welsh only: 50%
- Welsh and British: 8%
- Other Welsh combined: 4%
- English only: 8%
- English and British: 2%
- Other English combined: 1%
- British only: 21%
- Other British combined: 11%
- Other: 10%

== Industry ==
Industry sectors of Cardiff over time

== Religion ==
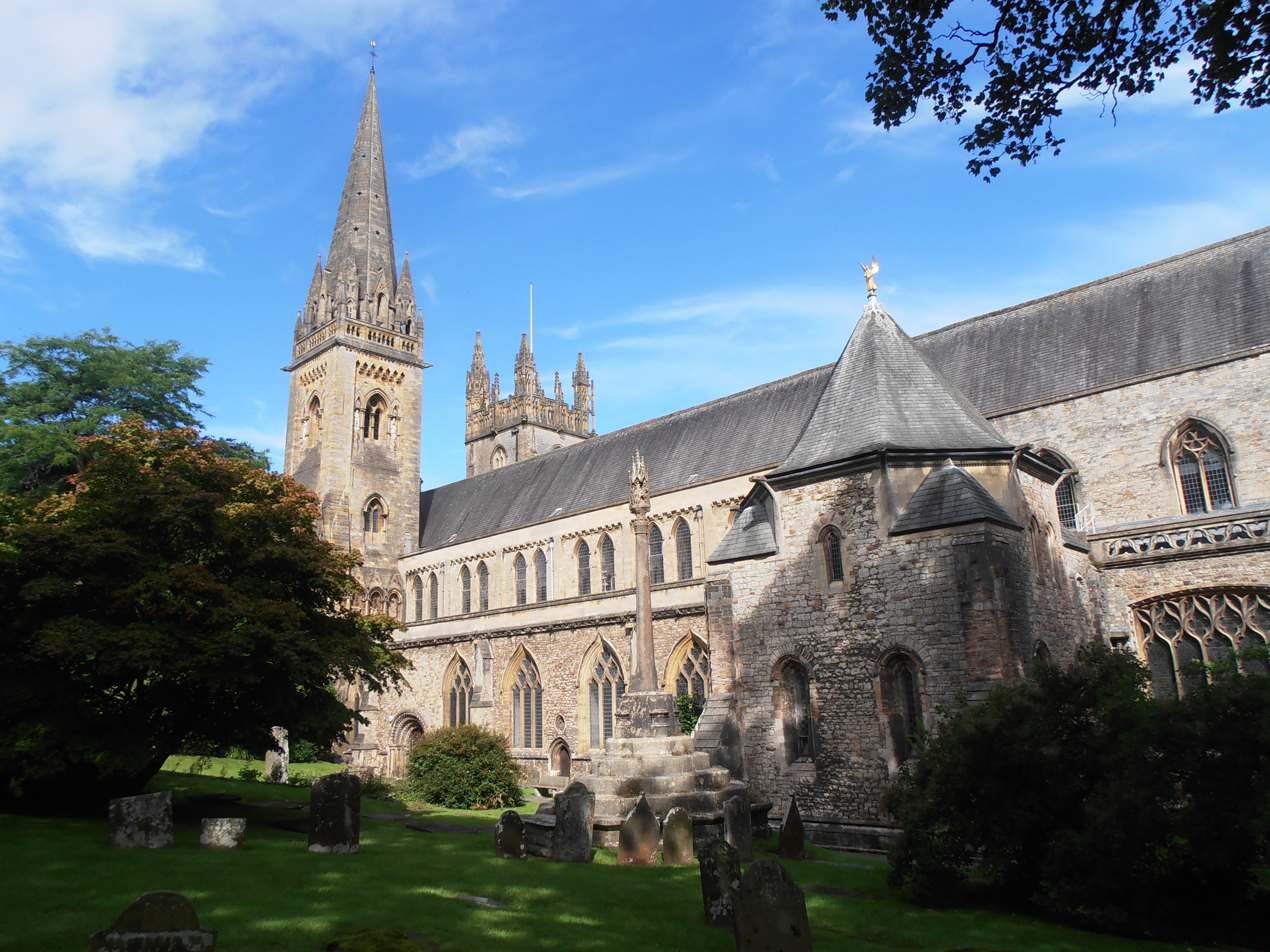
Llandaff Cathedral

Since 1922 Cardiff has included the suburban cathedral City of Llandaff, whose bishop is also Archbishop of Wales since 2002. There is also a Roman Catholic cathedral in the city. Since 1916 Cardiff has been the seat of a Catholic archbishop, but there appears to have been a fall in the estimated Catholic population, with estimated numbers in 2006 being around 25,000 less than in 1980. Likewise, the Jewish population of the city also appears to have fallen—there are two synagogues in Cardiff, one in Cyncoed and one in Moira Terrace, as opposed to seven at the turn of the 20th century. There are a significant number of nonconformist chapels, an early-20th century Greek Orthodox church and 11 mosques. In the 2001 census 66.9% of Cardiff's population described itself as Christian, a percentage point below the Welsh and UK averages.

In the 2001 census Cardiff's Muslim population stood at 3.7%, above the UK average (2.7%) and significantly above the Welsh average. Cardiff has one of the longest-established Muslim populations in the UK, started by Yemeni sailors who settled in the city during the 19th century. The first mosque in the UK (on the site of what is now known as the Al-Manar Islamic Centre) opened in 1860 in the Cathays district of Cardiff. Cardiff is now home to over 11,000 Muslims from many nationalities and backgrounds, nearly 52 per cent of the Welsh Muslim population.

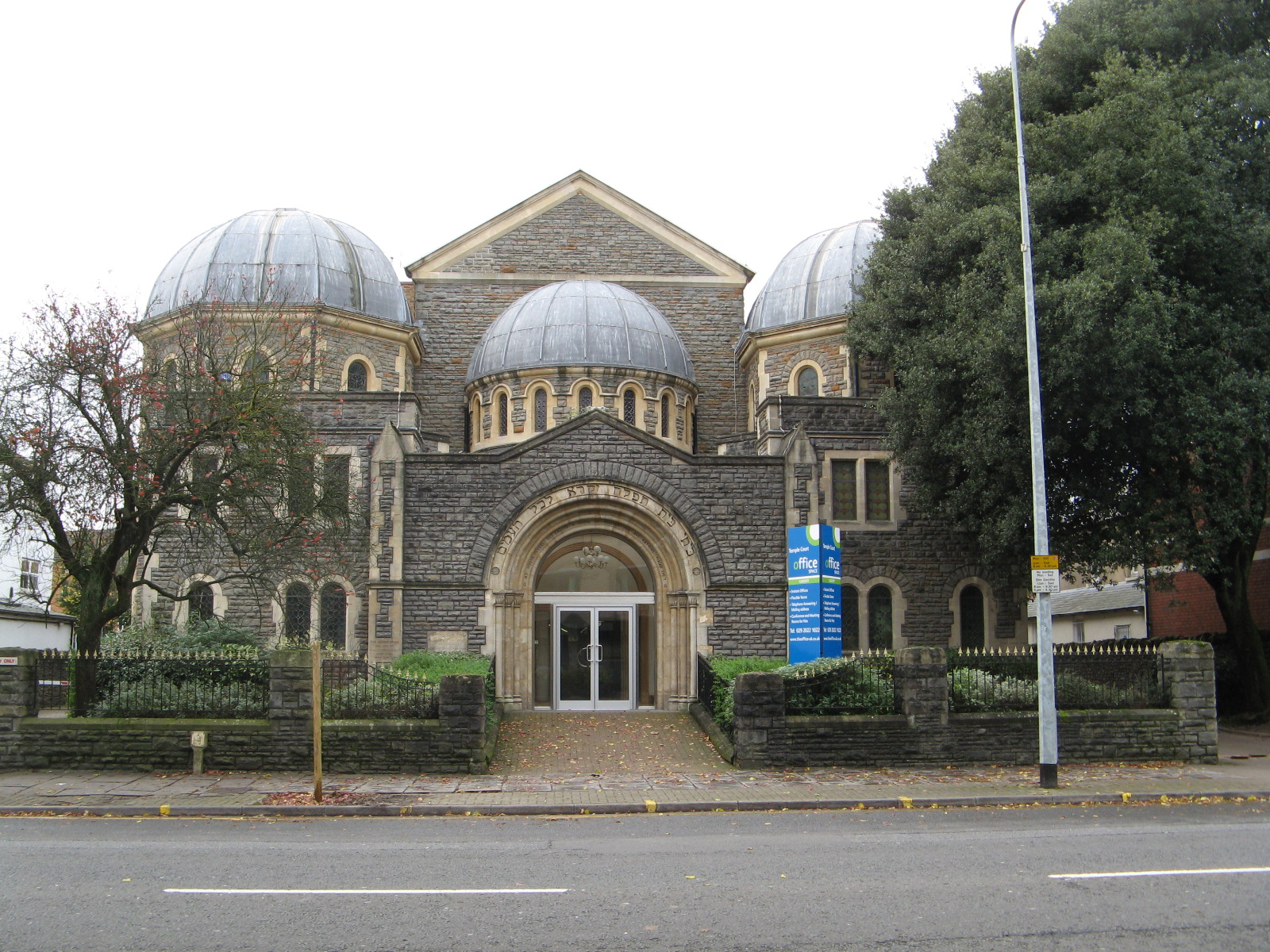
The former Cardiff Synagogue, Cathedral Road—now an office block.

The oldest of the non-Christian communities in Wales is Judaism. Jews were not permitted to live in Wales between the 1290 Edict of Expulsion—given by Edward I of England—and the seventeenth century. A Welsh Jewish community was re-established in the eighteenth century. There was once a fairly substantial Jewish population in South Wales, most of which has disappeared. The modern community is centred in the Cardiff United Synagogue.

The proportion of Cardiff residents declaring themselves to be Hindu, Sikh and Jewish were all considerably higher than the Welsh averages, but less than the UK figures. The city has been home to a sizeable Hindu community since Indian immigrants settled there during the 1950s and 1960s. The first Hindu temple in the city was opened in Grangetown on 6 April 1979 on the site of an abandoned printing press (which itself was the former site of a synagogue). The 25th anniversary of the temple's founding was celebrated in September 2007 with a parade of over 3000 people through the city centre, including Hindus from across the United Kingdom and members of Cardiff's other religious communities. Today, there are over 2000 Hindus in Cardiff, worshiping at three temples across the city.

In the 2001 census, 18.8% of the city's population stated they had no religion, while 8.6% did not state a religion.

Religion	2001		2011		2021	
Religion	Number	%	Number	%	Number	%
No religion	57,440	18.8	109,960	31.8	155,589	42.9
Christian	204,359	66.9	177,743	51.4	138,885	38.3
Muslim	11,261	3.7	23,656	6.8	33,650	9.3
Hindu	2,392	0.8	4,736	1.4	5,434	1.5
Buddhist	1,004	0.3	1,690	0.5	1,630	0.4
Sikh	928	0.3	1,317	0.4	1,517	0.4
Jewish	941	0.3	802	0.2	690	0.2
Other religion	760	0.2	1,406	0.4	2,028	0.6
Religion not stated	26,268	8.6	24,780	7.2	22,888	6.3
Total population	305,353	100.0	346,090	100.0	362,400	100.0
