= Nathan Abrams =

British academic (born 1972)

Nathan David Abrams (born 1972) is a British academic who is professor of film studies at Bangor University. He has also written about the history of the Jews in Wales.

== Career ==
Abrams was born in a Jewish family in north London. His doctoral thesis at the University of Birmingham was Struggling for freedom : Arthur Miller, the 'Commentary' community, and the cultural cold war (1998). He was a history lecturer at the University of Aberdeen. In 2006, he moved to Bangor University.

Abrams has written about American film director Stanley Kubrick. In Stanley Kubrick: New York Jewish Intellectual (2019), he wrote about the influence of the director's Jewish background. Robert P. Kolker and Abrams co-wrote Kubrick: An Odyssey, a 2024 biography marking the 25th anniversary of the director's death.

In 2007, Abrams received a £10,000 grant from the Clore Jewish Development Fund to support the Jewish community in Bangor and wider north Wales, noting the smaller size of the community compared to Aberdeen. Abrams's research discovered in 2010 that Jews lived in north Wales during its conquest and consolidation by Edward I of England; he put forward that they financed the king's castles before he expelled them. In March 2019, Abrams launched an app, map and exhibition on 24 sites of Jewish history in Bangor; some related to Isidore Wartski, the mayor from 1939 to 1941. Abrams's research led to a plaque being installed in tribute to Wartski in 2025.

== Personal life ==
Abrams and his Birmingham-born wife both learned the Welsh language and sent their children to a Welsh-language school. He said in 2022 that he still felt like an "outsider" in Wales, in part due to his birthplace and religion. On antisemitism in Wales, he said "the absence of Jews hasn't meant the absence of antisemitism or similar attitudes. It's actually the opposite".
