= 1911 South Wales anti-Jewish riots =

Anti-Jewish riots in South Wales in August 1911

- Date: August 19, 1911
- Location: South Wales; 51°46′39″N 3°14′26″W

Casualties
- Charged: 46
- Location within Wales

The 1911 South Wales anti-Jewish riots were a series of antisemitic riots that occurred in South Wales in the summer of 1911.

== Background ==
In the first years of the 1910s, before the beginning of World War I, Wales saw a significant period of unrest, known as the Great Unrest and centered around labour disputes, including the Miners Strike of 1910–11.

== Riots ==
On the evening of 19 August 1911, a group of miners in the town of Tredegar that had been drinking at a local pub decided to attack a local shop owned by a Jewish family, accusing the shopkeeper of overcharging miners. The attack quickly grew into a riot, involving more than 200 rioters and ransacking 20 Jewish-owned businesses. 15 people were recorded injured, however, none with serious injuries. The riots would spread to neighbouring villages in South Wales in the following days, including Caerphilly, Ebbw Vale and Bargoed. After several days, the chief constable in Monmouthshire called on the Home Office for help dealing with the riots. On 29 August, Home Secretary Winston Churchill ordered the deployment of the Worcestershire Regiment from Cardiff to put an end to the riots, describing it as a "pogrom," and the riots came to an end.

In early September 1911, 46 people were charged by the authorities over their roles in the riots, with the lawyer in charge of the prosecutions noting that they "were people who were generally considered respectable, the majority being colliers in regular employment and the wives of colliers." At trial, 38 of those accused were convicted, receiving prison sentences ranging from 28 days to three months. Public opinion was sympathetic to the rioters and complained that the sentences were too harsh and had not taken into consideration their respectable backgrounds.

The South Wales Baptist Association, which was influential in the region, refused to condemn the riots.

== Role of antisemitism ==
Despite the fact that the riots particularly targeted Jewish-run businesses, the relative role of antisemitism and general unrest over poverty has been debated by some historians. Historian William Rubinstein has argued that the role of antisemitism has been overemphasised to be used as an anti-devolution argument, saying that "rioters had issues with Jewish businesses, but that's not the same as being anti-Semitic." However, historian Geoffrey Alderman argued that the role of general economic unrest had been overemphasised in accounts of the riots, stating that there was evidence of "clearly anti-Semitic behaviour amongst the rioters." The Monmouthshire chief constable's report on the riots at the time stated that there was "a determination expressed by the inhabitants to get rid of [the Jewish population]," while the chief magistrate of the trials stated that "the first disturbances were no doubt anti-Jewish." Some reports have indicated that the riots may have been pre-arranged, including one read out by Liberal Party MP Arthur Markham on 22 August 1911, which stated that "there can be no doubt that this had been pre-arranged, although the police had no knowledge that such an attack was likely to take place. There were only eight constables available, and they were quite inadequate to deal with the disturbance, and could do little more than look on at the wrecking and looting or eighteen shops owned by Jews or persons of Jewish extraction." Historian Robin Douglas, in a 2024 article in The Welsh History Review, emphasizes the multifaceted causes of the riots, pointing to an interplay of antisemitism, economic hardship, and localized grievances against the backdrop of national industrial unrest. While acknowledging evidence of explicit antisemitic motivations, such as the targeting of Jewish-owned properties and references to Jews as exploitative landlords, Douglas also highlights the role of economic and social tensions exacerbated by the broader context of the Great Unrest. Further, he points to the fact that "Non-Jewish premises were attacked from the second night onwards. By contrast, in other contemporary Welsh race riots – those against Chinese people in July 1911 and against Black people in June 1919 – only members of the racial outgroup were attacked". Importantly, Douglas notes that casual antisemitism, manifesting in stereotypes about Jewish wealth and practices, interacted with broader frustrations over labour disputes and poverty, creating an environment ripe for scapegoating.

== See also ==
- 1919 South Wales race riots
- History of the Jews in Wales
- 1911 in Wales
