= History of the Jews in Wales =

Welsh Jews
Iddewon Cymreig יהודים וולשים

Total population
- 2,044 (2021)

Regions with significant populations
- Cardiff

Languages
- English, Welsh, Hebrew, Yiddish

Religion
- Judaism

Related ethnic groups
- British Jews, English Jews, Scottish Jews, Irish Jews, Northern Irish Jews, Ashkenazi Jews

The location of Wales (dark green) in the United Kingdom in Europe

The history of the Jews in Wales begins in the 13th century. However, after the English conquest of Wales (1277–1283), Edward I issued the 1290 Edict of Expulsion expelling the Jews from England. From then until the formal return of the Jews to England in 1655, there is only one mention of Jews on Welsh soil.

Jewish communities were recorded in the 18th century, while major Jewish settlement dates from the 19th century.

The 2021 census recorded 2,044 Jews in Wales, representing 0.1% of the population, down 9.4% since 2001.

== Middle Ages ==
Like the rest of Western Europe, medieval Wales was Christian.

The clergyman and author Gerald of Wales (c. 1146 – c. 1223) wrote an account of his journey through Wales in 1188 in order to recruit soldiers for the Third Crusade, the Itinerarium Cambriae (1191). In it, he makes no reference to Jews in Wales but includes an allegorical narrative concerning a Jew and a Christian priest travelling in Shropshire, England.

During the 13th century, there are records of Jews in Abergavenny, Caerleon and Chepstow, all of which were in the Marcher Lordships of South Wales.

When Edward I established new borough towns in North Wales, both before and after 1290, he ensured that the charters banned the presence of Jews. The 1284 town charters of Bere, Caernarfon, Conwy, Criccieth, Flint, Harlech and Rhuddlan stated that "Jews shall not sojourn in the borough at any time". Despite the general expulsion in 1290, the same clauses were used in the charters of Beaumaris (1296) and Overton, (1292).

It is likely that most, if not all, Jews left Wales after Edward I's act of 1290 although the writ of the English king would not have run in many of the Marcher Lordships. The Welsh chronicle Brut y Tywysogion refers to the act but only in the context of the Jews in neighbouring England. There is a record of an unnamed Jew in the commote of Manor Deilo in Carmarthenshire (outside the Marcher Lordships) in 1386/7.

== Early modern period ==
In England, between 1290 and their formal return to that country in 1655, there are no other official traces of Jews as such except in connection with the Domus Conversorum, which kept a number of Jews who had converted to Christianity within its precincts up to 1551 and even later. There is no comparable evidence for Wales.

The BBC notes, "The oldest non-Christian faith [in Wales] to be established was Judaism, with a presence in Swansea dating from around 1730. Jewish communities were formed in the next century in Cardiff, Merthyr Tydfil, Pontypridd and Tredegar."

== Modern period ==
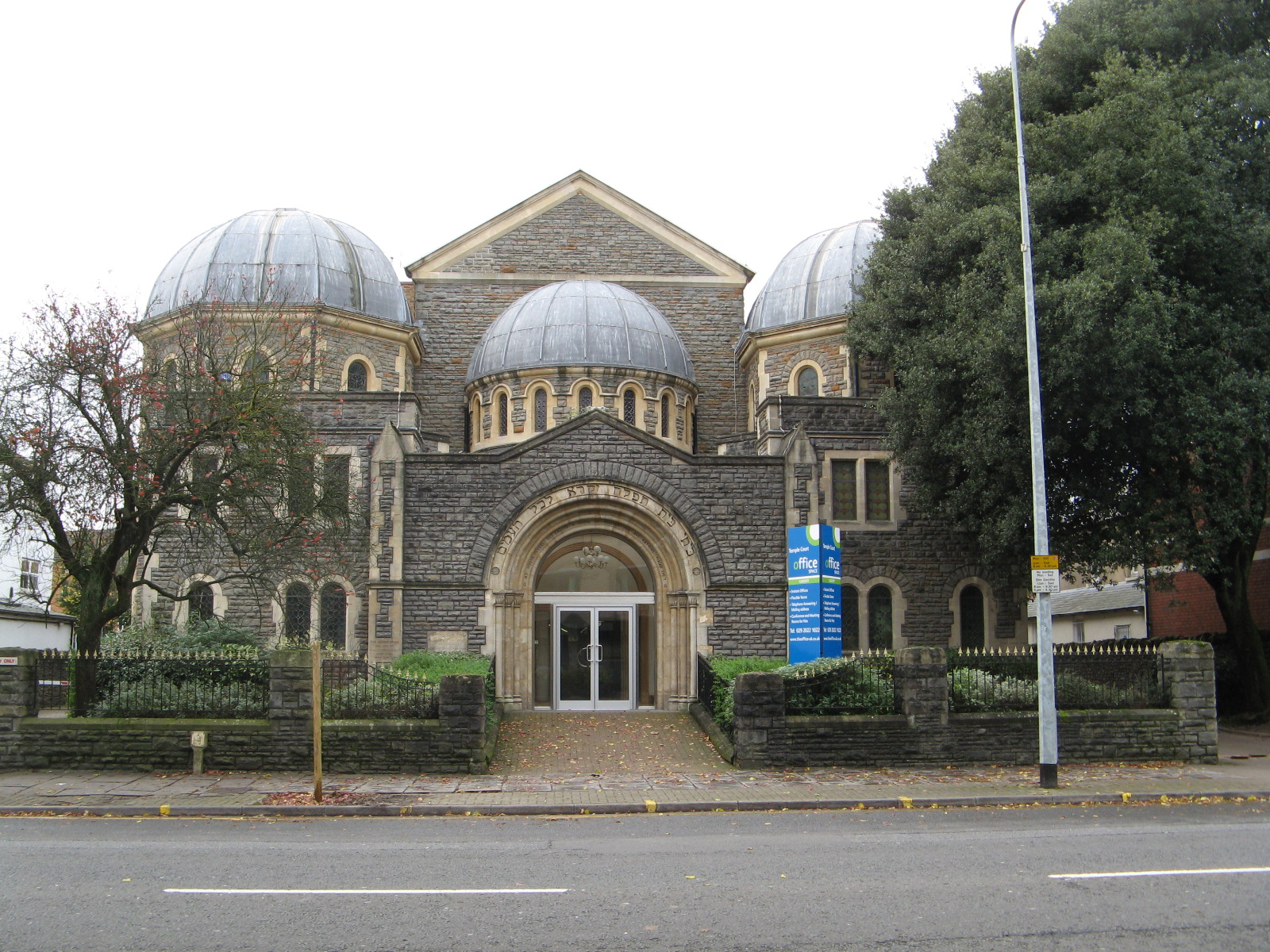
The former Cardiff Synagogue on Cathedral Road. This synagogue is now an office block

The rapid expansion of the coal mining industry in the 19th century led to major economic growth and a vast increase in immigration to Wales. The Jews immigrated to Wales in large numbers, leading to the founding of new Jewish communities, particularly in the heavily industrialized South Wales Valleys. While the Cardiff Jewish population was 13 families in 1852, after the influx of Jews fleeing from Russian pogroms in the 1880s the city's Jewish population rose to a peak of 5,500. A synagogue was founded in Merthyr Tydfil in 1875, and by the end of the century, most towns in the Valleys had small Jewish communities and trading stations. Generally, these communities appear to have been well tolerated, though there were some notable exceptions. In 1911, antisemitic sentiment came to a head in the Tredegar area, where working-class mobs attacked Jewish-owned businesses, causing thousands of pounds worth of damage. Early 20th-century Welsh Jewish society is featured in the 1999 film Solomon & Gaenor, which is set at the time of the Tredegar riots.

Some of these topics were covered in the documentary The Kosher Comedian presented by Jewish-Welsh writer comedian Bennett Arron.

Jewish communities continue to be substantial in Wales, being augmented by refugees from Nazi-dominated Europe in the late 1930s. See also Jews escaping from Nazi Europe to Britain.

The modern community in South Wales is centred on the Cardiff Reform Synagogue and the Cardiff United Synagogue. There is also a Jewish community in Swansea. The synagogue of Merthyr Tydfil, the major one north of Cardiff, ceased to hold regular services in the 1970s and was later sold. It is a listed building and, while there is planning permission to convert it into flats, there are calls for it to be moved to the National Museum of Wales at St Fagans, near Cardiff.

The Welsh Jewish community held numerically steady between the 2011 and 2021 censuses.

In his 2026 book Jews in the Welsh Imagination: Medieval Times to the Present, Nathan Abrams of Bangor University reported on attitudes towards Jews in Wales, a region that has had few Jewish residents for more than a thousand years and whose most recent numbers in census data accounted for less than one-tenth of one percent of the Welsh population. Abrams noted that "the absence of Jews hasn't meant the absence of antisemitism".

== Notable people ==
Notable people of Welsh-Jewish background include:

- Louis Barnett Abrahams
- Dannie Abse
- Leo Abse
- Wilfred Abse
- Bennett Arron
- David Baddiel
- Alex Carlile, Baron Carlile of Berriew
- Isaac Cohen
- Sacha Baron Cohen, father Gerald of Welsh-Jewish origin
- Maurice Edelman
- Raymond Garlick
- David Glick
- Albert Gubay
- Michael Howard
- David Jacobs
- Joe Jacobson
- Barnett Janner
- Greville Janner
- Brian Josephson
- Denise Levertov
- Susan Mendus
- Michael Moritz
- Lucy Owen
- Jon Ronson
- Bernice Rubens
- Joshua Seigal
- Norman Solomon
- Lord Stone of Hendon, Dr Sir Joseph Ellis Stone
- Lord Ashdown of Chelwood
- Sara Sugarman

== See also ==
- Jewish history
- Judaism by country
