= Robert P. Kolker =

Film and media studies historian/theorist/critic

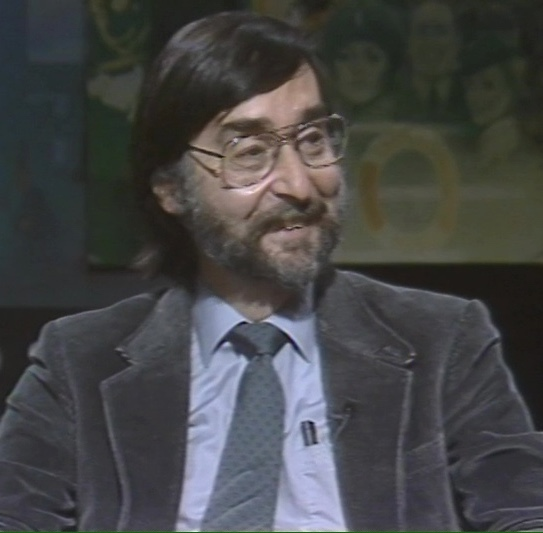
Kolker on CUNY TV's Cinema Then, Cinema Now (1987)

Robert Phillip Kolker is an American film historian, theorist, and critic. He has authored and edited a number of influential books on cinema and media studies. He is a Professor Emeritus at the University of Maryland, College Park.

== Early life ==
Robert P. Kolker graduated with a PhD in English literature from Columbia University in 1969. In the early 1970s, Kolker began writing about filmmakers for Film Comment and Sight and Sound. In 1972 Kolker interviewed Jean-Luc Godard and Jean-Pierre Gorin while they were on a U.S. film tour. The interview was originally published by Sight and Sound in 1973, and later reprinted in David Sterritt's 1998 book of Godard interviews.

== Career ==
A film academic and media studies scholar, Kolker has taught at the University of Maryland, Georgia Tech, and the University of Virginia. He specializes in cinema of the United States, international cinema, European art cinema, Latin American cinema, and cultural studies.

His first book A Cinema of Loneliness: Penn, Kubrick, Coppola, Scorsese, Altman was first published in 1980 by Oxford University Press, and is in its fourth revised edition. The Directors Guild of America said it "remains the most acute and perceptive critical study of some of the finest films and directors of the Hollywood New Wave." The book examined film directors of the "New Hollywood", who had been influenced by American film noir and the French New Wave, and how their films influenced American society of the 1960s and 1970s. Kolker observed that "for all the challenge and adventure, their films speak to a continual impotence in the world, an inability to change and to create change. When they do depict action, it is invariably performed by lone heroes in an enormously destructive and antisocial manner." In A Cinema of Loneliness, Kolker also wrote about buddy films as an extension of male bonding, in which men in these movies could engage in nonsexual activity together while marginalizing women. Kolker noted that Robert Altman was one of the few American filmmakers to examine the results of men's violent acts, and that Altman's 1982 film Come Back to the 5 & Dime dealt with the "crisis of women confronting the oppression of patriarchy." Kolker also pointed out that the aural and visual simultaneity in Altman's films was critical as that represented an emphasis on the plurality of events, which required viewers to become active spectators. According to Kolker, Stanley Kubrick's films were "more intellectually rigorous than the work of any other American filmmaker." Kolker's second book The Altering Eye: Contemporary International Cinema, published in 1983 also by Oxford University Press, concentrated on image, form, and politics in film since World War II, particularly in Europe and Latin America.

In addition to Kubrick, Kolker's analysis of film auteurs includes books on Orson Welles, Alfred Hitchcock, Bernardo Bertolucci, and Wim Wenders. Luciana Bohne, co-founder of Film Criticism, said Kolker's 1985 book on Bertolucci was "first rate" in its exploration of the director's Marx/Freud dialectic. Writing about Bertolucci's 1970 made-for-TV film The Spider's Stratagem, about an alleged anti-fascist hero, Kolker observed the film was "about the political effects of spectacle" and how it permitted the viewer to identify and comprehend participating in it. The book also observed that Bertolucci's representation of women was problematic, due to the way he "often places them in inferior or, worse, destructive roles."

Kolker's books and articles of the 1980s, while heavily focused on male auteurs, analyzed cinema using feminist film theory (such as that of Laura Mulvey). And in 1989 he co-authored an article with Madeleine Cottenet-Hage on the cinema of Marguerite Duras. Hage was Professor Emerita of French at the University of Maryland, College Park.

Kolker has also written for Film Quarterly and Cinema Journal. Kolker, writing in 2004 for Cinema Journal, pushed for film/media studies to return to a seriousness and celebration of complexity, history, and politics. "Film/media studies," he wrote, "is in many important ways, only getting started. As filmmaking itself turns more and more to the digital, we become archivists of past knowledge, scholars of the present, prophets of the future. As our outlook broadens and we begin to understand the intertextualities of film and all other visual and narrative arts, we can see that film is part of the overwhelming text of cultural practice."

In 2006, a 30th-anniversary 2-disc "Collector's Edition" DVD of Martin Scorsese's film Taxi Driver was released. The first disc contained the film itself with audio commentary by Kolker and screenwriter Paul Schrader, and the second disc contained special features with those two in addition to extensive reflections from Scorsese.

In 2006, Kolker edited an Oxford University Press book on Kubrick's 1968 science fiction film 2001: A Space Odyssey to reexamine its complexities. Contributors included Barry Keith Grant, Marcia Landy, Michael Mateas, and Susan White. In 2019, Kolker co-authored a book on Kubrick's 1999 film Eyes Wide Shut. Kolker has also written about The Stanley Kubrick Archive at University of the Arts London.

In 2008, Kolker edited The Oxford Handbook of Film and Media Studies, which included perspectives on film and media in the U.S., Latin America, Asia, and the Middle East. Articles in the book also explored developments in new media, examining topics such as copyright, globalization, and video game genres. In the book's introduction, Kolker wrote,

"Traditional film studies starts with the individual work, genre, or director, and moves outward to larger issues of the ideologies of production and reception, to gender issues, to the effects of distribution on viewership, and increasingly to the ways globalization is affecting national cinemas, always attempting to solidify its ground in theory. Media studies starts with larger textual entities, sometimes isolating a media artifact – a genre of music, a television series, a social-networking site, a computer game — often analyzing these from the perspective of subcultural, audience-specific interaction."

In his 2015 book The Cultures of American Film, Kolker said cultures are "expressions of our engagement — individually, by group, class, race, gender, by institutions — with one another and with the world at large," and film culture is created when filmmakers decide to "engage with the world by creating movies" and when viewers "engage with films according to...taste and the responses learned by seeing many other films." The book chapters integrated technical and analytical aspects of American film into the book's cultural survey, although analysis of race and racism was mostly confined to examinations of Sidney Poitier, blaxploitation films, and the distressing legacy of D. W. Griffith's controversial, racist 1915 film The Birth of a Nation. For example, Kolker pointed out that William Joseph Simmons, future Imperial Wizard of the Ku Klux Klan, had capitalized on The Birth of a Nation's initial popularity to "run an ad for the Klan next to an ad for the movie," resulting in the dormant hate organization being "reborn at Stone Mountain, Georgia."

Kolker has co-authored with Nathan Abrams two books on Stanley Kubrick:

Eyes Wide Shut: Stanley Kubrick and the Making of his Final Film (Oxford University Press, 2019) is an "archeology" of the film from inception to pre-production, production, and post production, including discussion about whether the release print of Eyes Wide Shut is the film Kubrick wanted the public to see.

Kubrick: An Odyssey (Faber & Faber, Pegasus/Simon & Schuster, 2024) is a "cradle to grave" biography of one of the great filmmakers of the 20th century. It draws upon original research in the Kubrick Archives at the University of the Arts, London, as well as interviews with family members and co-workers.

== Selected works ==
- A Cinema of Loneliness: Penn, Kubrick, Coppola, Scorsese, Altman (1980)
- The Altering Eye: Contemporary International Cinema (1983)
- Bernardo Bertolucci (1985)
- The Films of Wim Wenders: Cinema as Vision and Desire (1993) – with Peter Beicken
- Film, Form, and Culture (1998)
- Alfred Hitchcock's Psycho: A Casebook (2004) – editor
- Stanley Kubrick's 2001: A Space Odyssey: New Essays (2006) – editor
- The Oxford Handbook of Film & Media Studies (2008) – editor
- The Cultures of American Film (2015)
- The Extraordinary Image: Orson Welles, Alfred Hitchcock, Stanley Kubrick, and the Reimagining of Cinema (2017)
- Politics Goes to the Movies: Hollywood, Europe, and Beyond (2018)
- Eyes Wide Shut: Stanley Kubrick and the Making of His Final Film (2019) – with Nathan Abrams
- Triumph over Containment: American Film in the 1950s (2021)
- Kubrick: An Odyssey (2024) - with Nathan Abrams
