= Israel Bartal =

Chair of Jewish history at Hebrew University

- ישראל ברטל
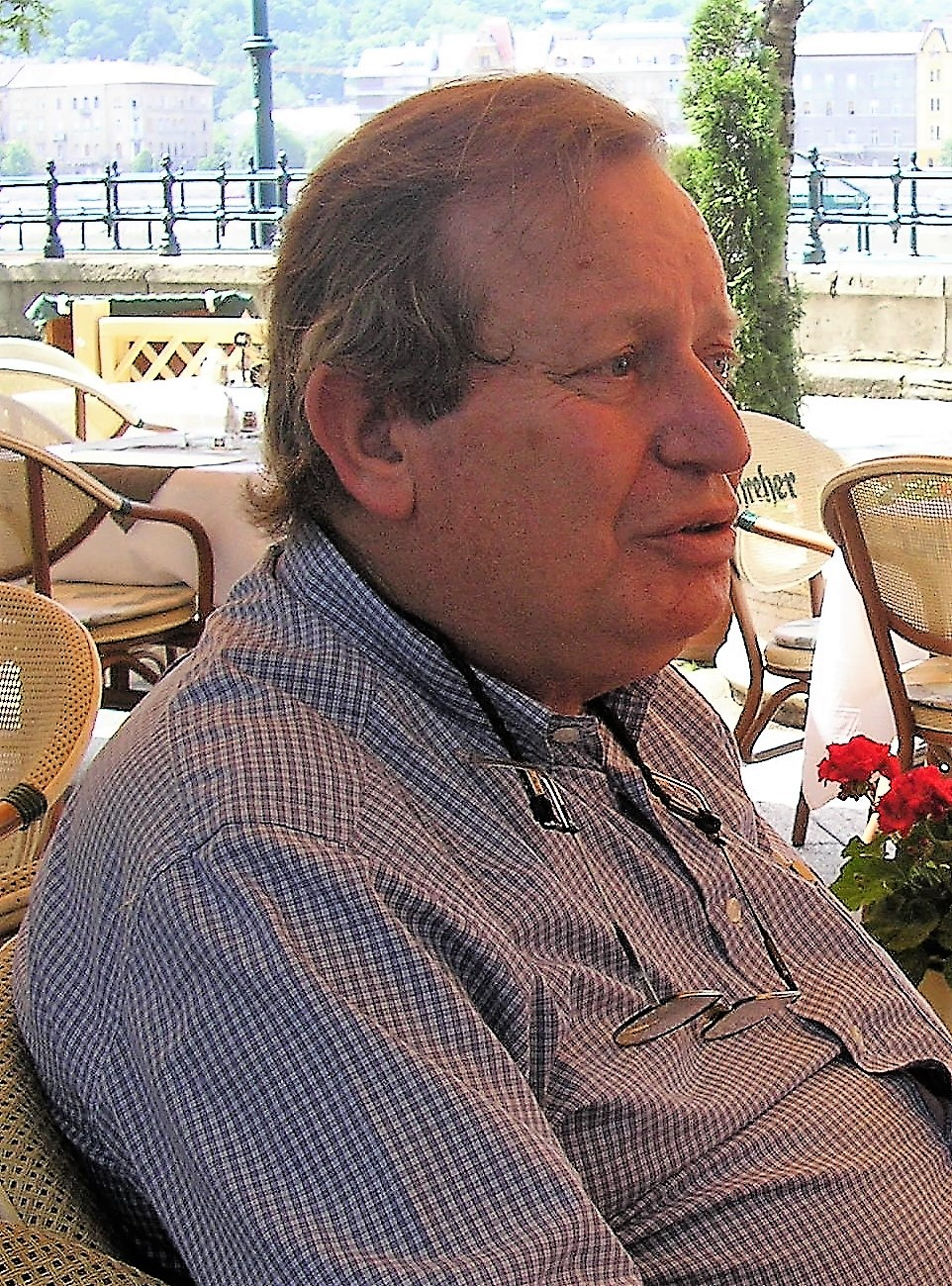
- Born: Tel Aviv, Israel
- Education: Hebrew University
- Occupation: Avraham Harman Professor

Israel Bartal (Hebrew: ישראל ברטל), is Avraham Harman Professor of Jewish History, member of Israel Academy of Sciences (2016), and the former Dean of the Faculty of Humanities at Hebrew University (2006–2010). Since 2006 he is the chair of the Historical Society of Israel. He served as director of the Center for Research on the History and Culture of Polish Jewry, and the academic chairman of the Project of Jewish Studies in Russian at the Hebrew University of Jerusalem. Professor Bartal was the co-director of the Center for Jewish Studies and Civilization at Moscow State University. Bartal received his PhD from Hebrew University in 1981. He focuses his research on the history of the Jews in Palestine, the Jews of Eastern Europe, the Haskalah Movement, Jewish Orthodoxy and modern Jewish historiography.

Professor Bartal taught at Harvard University, McGill University, University of Pennsylvania Rutgers University and Johns Hopkins, as well as at Moscow State University (MGU), the Central European University in Budapest (CEU), and Paideia in Stockholm. He was for many years a faculty member of the Open University of Israel and has contributed to the development of its teaching programs. Since November 1, 2010 he is a visiting scholar at the Simon-Dubnow-Institut, at Leipzig University. Bartal is one of the founders of Cathedra, the leading scholarly journal on the history of the Land of Israel, and had served as its co-editor for over twenty years. Since 1998 he is the editor of vestnik, a scholarly journal of Jewish studies in Russian. From 1995 to 2003 he chaired the Israeli history high-school curriculum committee.

Bartal has published many books and numerous articles on the history and culture of East European Jewry, Palestine in the pre-Zionist era, and Jewish nationalism.

Among his recent publications:

- Poles and Jews: a Failed Brotherhood (with Magdalena Opalski, Hanover, University Press of New England, 1992);
- Exile in the Land (published in Hebrew, Jerusalem, ha-Sifriya ha-Tsiyonit, 1994);
- From Corporation to Nation: The Jews of Eastern Europe, 1772-1881 (Tel Aviv, Misrad ha-Bitahon Publishing House, 2002);
- A Century of Israeli Culture (editor, Jerusalem, The Hebrew University Magnes Press, 2002);
- Kehal Yisrael vol. 3 (editor, Jerusalem, Merkaz Shazar, 2004);
- The Jews of Eastern Europe. 1772-1881 (University of Pennsylvania Press, 2005, 2006, published also in Russian and German);
- The Varieties of Haskalah (editor, with Shmuel Feiner, Jerusalem, The Hebrew University Magnes Press, 2005);
- Cossack and Bedouin: Land and People in Jewish Nationalism, (Tel Aviv, Am Oved Publishers, 2007)
- Tangled Roots, The Emergence of Israeli Culture, Brown Judaic Studies, (Providence RI, 2020);

He is co-editor (with Antony Polonsky) of Polin, vol. 12 (1999), which focuses on the Jews in Galicia, 1772–1914.

== Edited books (in Hebrew) ==
- (1975) יעקב צור, דיוקנה של התפוצה, הוצאת כתר, ירושלים
- (1977) עם יהושע קניאל וזאב צחור), העלייה השנייה, א-ג, הוצאת יד יצחק בן צבי, ירושלים תשנ"ח)
- (1987) משה בדורו, על משה מונטיפיורי ופעליו, אסופת מאמרים, משגב ירושלים - המכון לחקר מורשת יהדות ספרד והמזרח, תשמ"ז
- (1993) עם חוה טורניאנסקי ועזרא מנדלסון), כמנהג אשכנז ופולין: ספר יובל לחנא שמרוק, קובץ מחקרים בתרבות יהודית, מרכז זלמן שזר, תשנ"ג)
- (1994) עם רחל אליאור וחנא שמרוק) צדיקים ואנשי מעשה מחקרים בחסידות פולין, מוסד ביאליק, תשנ"ד)
- (1994) עם יונתן פרנקל), בין פולין לרוסיה, מחקרים בתולדות יהודי מזרח אירופה, ספר זיכרון לשמואל אטינגר, מרכז שזר, ירושלים תשנ"ה)
- (1998) עם ישעיהו גפני), ארוס, אירוסין ואיסורים, מיניות ומשפחה בהיסטוריה, הוצאת מרכז שזר, תשנ"ח)
- (1999) עם יוסי בן ארצי ואלחנן ריינר, נוף מולדתו: מחקרים בגאוגרפיה של ארץ ישראל ובתולדותיה מוגשים ליהושע בן אריה, הוצאת ספרים ע"ש י"ל מאגנס, תש"ס
- (1999) הקריאה לנביא, מחקרי היסטוריה וספרות, מאת חנא שמרוק, ירושלים: מרכז זלמן שזר, תש"ס
- (2001) עם ישראל גוטמן), קיום ושבר, יהודי פולין לדורותיהם, מרכז זלמן שזר, תשנ"ז 1997-תשס"א)
- (2002) עם דוד אסף), מווילנה לירושלים: מחקרים בתולדותיהם ובתרבותם של יהודי מזרח אירופה מוגשים לפרופסור שמואל ורסס, הוצאת ספרים ע"ש י"ל מאגנס, תשס"ב)
- (2002) העגלה המלאה: מאה ועשרים שנות תרבות בישראל, הוצאת ספרים על שם י"ל מאגנס, תשס"ב
- (2005) עם שמואל פיינר), ההשכלה לגווניה: עיונים חדשים בתולדות ההשכלה ובספרותה, הוצאת ספרים ע"ש י"ל מאגנס, בית הספרים הלאומי והאוניברסיטאי, ירושלים תשס"ה)
- (2007) עם שמואל פיינר), היסטוריוגרפיה במבחן: עיון מחודש במשנתו של יעקב כ"ץ, מרכז שזר, תשס"ח)
- (2010) עם חיים גורן), ספר ירושלים בשלהי התקופה העות'מאנית (1917-1800), הוצאת יד יצחק בן צבי, תש"ע)
- (2010) עם אברהם גרינבוים ודן חרוב), ספרא וסייפא: שמעון דובנוב - היסטוריון ואיש ציבור, מרכז זלמן שזר, תשע"א)
- יומן מסע ואגרות ארץ ישראל בשנות השלושים למאה הי"ט, יד יצחק בן-צבי, תשל"ד
- עם שמואל אטינגר ומיכאל גרץ), ישן מול חדש: פעולותיהם של ארגונים יהודיים עולמיים בארץ-ישראל, במאה הי"ט ובימי המנדט, מרכז שזר, תש"ן)
- (עם אבנר הולצמן ויונתן מאיר), מנדלי מוכר ספרים: מבטים חדשים, האקדמיה הלאומית הישראלית למדעים, ירושלים תשפ"ה
