= Zabadeans =

The Zabadeans were an Arab tribe attacked and looted by Jonathan upon his return from Damascus after chasing an army which had escaped over the river Eleutherus.

== See Also ==
- Al-Labwani
- Al-Zabadani
- Anti-Lebanon
