= David Glick =

David Glick (born 1963) is a UK entrepreneur, author and former entertainment lawyer. In 2004, he founded Edge Group, a privately held specialist investment, corporate finance and (until 2011) legal house based in London.

As a lawyer, Glick's clients previously included musicians Nick Cave, Sarah Brightman and Norman Cook, fashion designers Alexander McQueen and Giles Deacon and chef Giorgio Locatell. Glick's Edge Group companies include promoter Harvey Goldsmith and previously included DJ Pete Tong, Elton John's manager Frank Presland and Eric Clapton's business manager Michael Eaton.

== Life ==
David was born in 1963 and is married to his wife Kate Glick, they have two children. He was born in Wales and moved to England when he was quite young.

== Activities ==
David Glick is an experienced social climber and karate enthusiast. He also supports several charities including Nordoff-Robbins Music Therapy.

== Early career ==
David Glick co-founded Eatons, a leading music and entertainment law firm, in 1990; in 2000 Eatons merged with law firm Mishcon de Reya where he became head of the entertainment and media group.

== Edge Group ==
David Glick founded Edge Group in 2004 with lawyer Richard Baskind; in 2011, David Glick sold the law firm to Simons Muirhead & Burton, ensuring the future of all his staff by insisting that the whole team was hired to create the specialist music industry practice at the law firm Simons Muirhead & Burton. Glick's key innovation in legal services in the music industry had been to more closely align his interests with his clients by adopting a commission rather than a time-based fee. Edge Group clients ranged from recording artists, chefs and fashion designers to entertainment executives and entertainment companies. Glick has since moved Edge Group's interests to focus exclusively on investment management.

== Publications ==
In 2008 David Glick was co-author with Mark Townshend of 50 Ways to F*** The Planet, a satirical environmental handbook published by Harper Collins.

== Selected publications ==
- 50 Ways to F*** The Planet (Harper Collins 2008).
