= Cardiff United Synagogue =

Orthodox synagogue in Cardiff, Wales

- Location of the synagogue in Wales

Religion
- Affiliation: Orthodox Judaism
- Ecclesiastical or organizational status: Synagogue
- Status: Active

Location
- Location: Cyncoed Gardens, Cyncoed, Cardiff, Wales CF23 5SL
- Country: United Kingdom
- Interactive map of Cardiff United Synagogue
- Coordinates: 51°30′21″N 3°09′37″W

Architecture
- Established: 1841 (as a congregation): 1853 (Old Hebrew); 1889 (New Orthodox); 1918 (Windsor Place); 1955 (Penylan); 2003 (merged)
- Completed: 1853 (Trinity Street); 1858 (Bute Street); 1889 (Edwards Place); 1897 (Cathedral Road); 1900 (Merches Place); 1918 (Windsor Place); 1955 (Penylan); 2003 (Cyncoed)

The Cardiff United Synagogue, also called the Cardiff Shul, is an Orthodox Jewish synagogue, located in Cyncoed Gardens, in the Cyncoed suburb of Cardiff, Wales, in the United Kingdom.

The synagogue maintains daily prayer services, led by Rabbi Michoel Rose. The synagogue also provides educational classes, youth and festivals programming and is instrumental in interfaith work in South Wales.

== History ==
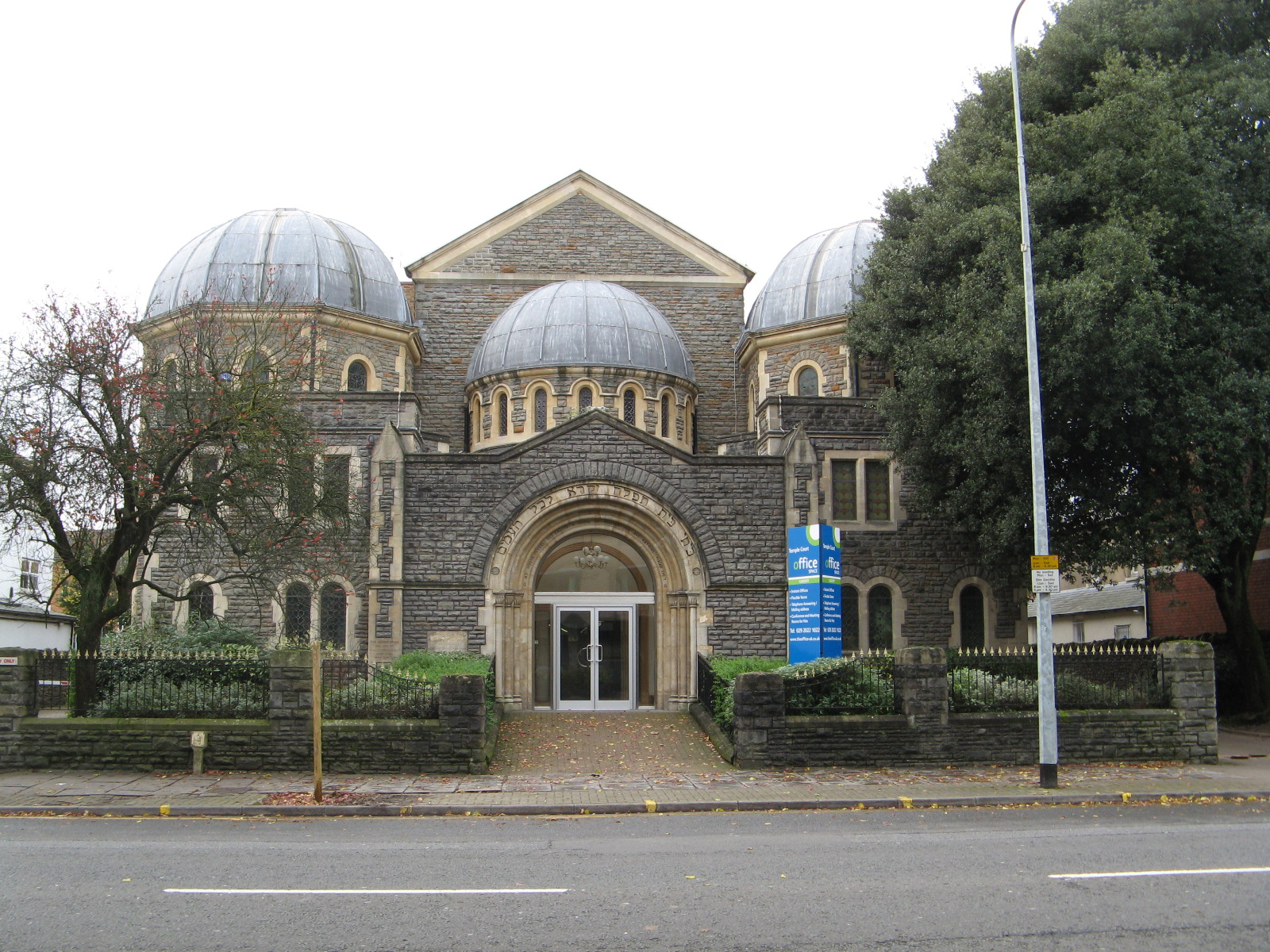
The former synagogue building on Cathedral Road; now an office block

A Jewish community existed in Cardiff by 1841, when the Marquess of Bute donated land at Highfield for a Jewish cemetery. The congregation that is now established in Cyncoed is the result of the merger of several historic congregations, and can trace its roots to the Old Hebrew Congregation, which erected a synagogue building on Trinity Street in 1853, and to the Bute Street synagogue of 1858. Bute Street was the centre of the Jewish community in the nineteenth century.

Former locations and ancestral congregations in Cardiff include the following:

- Original (Old Hebrew) congregation:
  - Trinity Street, Cardiff (1853–1858)
  - East Terrace, Bute Street, Cardiff (1858–1897; redeveloped 1888)
  - Cathedral Road, Cardiff (1897–1989)
- New (Orthodox) congregation:
  - Edwards Place, Cardiff (1889–1900)
  - Merches Place, Cardiff (1900–?)
- Windsor Place congregation, Windsor Place, Cardiff (1918–1955)
- Penylan congregation, Ty Gwyn Road, Penylan (1955–2003)

The most architecturally distinguished of the several historic synagogue buildings was the classical/eclectic synagogue in Windsor Place. One of the congregation's former buildings was purchased in 1979 and converted into a Hindu temple. With the diminution of the Cardiff Jewish community and a drift away from the older neighbourhoods, these congregations consolidated in the present, modern building in Cyncoed Gardens, Cyncoed, dedicated by Chief Rabbi Jonathan Sacks in 2003.

== Notable members ==
- Joe Jacobson (born 1986), footballer

== See also ==
- List of Jewish communities in the United Kingdom
- History of the Jews in Wales
