= Genetic studies of Jews =

DNA analysis of Jewish populations

Genetic studies have been used to investigate the origins of diverse Jewish ethnic subgroups, and assess shared ancestry between Jewish and non-Jewish populations. The medical genetics of Jews is a subset of this research, that focuses on population-specific diseases and on genetic conditions shared with other ethnic groups.

Studies on Jewish populations have been principally conducted using all three types of genealogical DNA tests: autosomal (atDNA), mitochondrial (mtDNA), and Y-chromosome (Y-DNA). Autosomal testing, which looks at the largest sets of genes within peoples' DNA, shows that Jewish populations tend to form genetic isolates – relatively closely related groups in independent communities with most in a community sharing significant ancestry. The Ashkenazi Jews form the largest such group. Mitochondrial and Y-DNA tests look at maternal and paternal ancestry respectively, via two small groups of genes transmitted only via female or male ancestors.

Studies on the genetic composition of Ashkenazi, Sephardi, and Mizrahi Jewish populations of the Jewish diaspora show significant amounts of shared Middle Eastern ancestry, as well as admixture from local populations. Jews living in the North African, Italian, and Iberian regions show variable frequencies of genetic overlap with the historical non-Jewish population along the maternal lines. In the case of Ashkenazi and Sephardi Jews (in particular Moroccan Jews), who are closely related, the source of non-Middle-Eastern admixture is mainly Southern European. Some researchers have remarked on an especially close relationship between Ashkenazi Jews and modern Italians, Greeks, and other Southern Europeans. Bene Israel and the Cochin Jews of India, and Beta Israel of Ethiopia, resemble their local populations but also may have some admixture.

== Religious, historical, and genetic perspectives on Jewish identity ==
Jewish identity and Jewish peoplehood are multifaceted, and there are multiple theories on the ethnic origins of Jews. According to one Israeli rabbi, David Hartman, "One of the salient features of modern Jewry is the lack of consensus about what constitutes membership in the Jewish people." Jewishness can be placed at the intersection of ethnicity, nationality, religion and race, extending beyond the specifics of religious observance. The traditional belief is that Jews descended from the ancient Israelites, without implying that all Jews are biological descendants, since conversion has always been part of Judaism.

The advent of modern genetic research methods has led to extensive genetic studies on the topic. Such research has identified genotypic common denominators of Jewish people, but while certain detectable Middle Eastern genetic components exist in numerous Jewish communities, there is no single definitive Jewish prototype.

Genomic research has found that most Jewish populations share genetic commonalities with each other, and are distinguishable from non-Jewish groups. Several studies have found genetic continuity with studied medieval individuals from before the 14th century, indicating that one or more genetic bottlenecks predates that timeframe. Some of them were thought to have been victims of pogroms or antisemitic violence, were identifiably Jewish, but had important differences from modern populations, with an increase in homogeneity seen today.

== Autosomal DNA ==
These studies focus upon autosomal chromosomes, the 22 homologous or autosomes (non-sex chromosomes)

=== Summary ===
Autosomal DNA studies show high levels of genetic relatedness among Ashkenazi, Sephardi, and Mizrahi Jews, corresponding to a shared Middle Eastern ancestry with variations in regional admixture. Autosomal DNA evidence supports the historical narrative of Jewish populations originating from the ancient Levant, with genetic diversity shaped by migrations, admixture, and isolation over millennia. Note, however, that the modern population of Southern Europe, often used as the European reference population in such studies, itself contains substantial ancient Middle Eastern ancestry, while present-day populations of the Levant exhibit considerable recent Sub-Saharan African ancestry, leading to an underestimation of the Levantine component of the Ashkenazi Jewish genome.

Ashkenazi Jews ancestry proportions estimates
Study	Tool / method	Middle Eastern	European
Lerga-Jaso et al., 2025	Orchestra / LAI	23.8% (16.6% Levantine, 7.2% ICT)	72.1% (68% Italian, 2.4% Greek, 1.7% Eastern Europe)
Waldman et al., 2022	QpAdm	19%	81%: 65% Southern Italian, 16% Eastern Europe
Waldman et al., 2022	QpAdm	43%	57%: 37% North Italian, 20% Eastern Europe
Waldman et al., 2022	QpAdm	32%	68%: 51% Greek, 17% Eastern Europe
Agranat-Tamir et al., 2020	LINADMIX, PHCP	59% (MLBA Levant and chalcolithic Iran)	41% (Late Neolithic and Bronze Age Europe)
Xue et al., 2017	GLOBETROTTER	30% (Levantine)	70% (55% Southern European, 10% Eastern European, 5% Western European)
Xue et al., 2017	RFMix / LAI	47% (mostly Levantine)	53%

Ashkenazi Jews share genetic similarities with Southern Europeans, such as Italians and Greeks, while exhibiting unique markers distinguishing them from non-Jewish groups. Similarly, North African Jews also exhibit proximity to European and Middle Eastern groups, reflecting their historical migration pattern. Other studies also reveal significant regional genetic diversity, such as the Berber admixture in Libyan Jews, or Ethiopian Jews' local ancestry combined with Middle Eastern links.

In autosomal analyses, the Iraqi Jews, Iranian Jews, Bukharian Jews, Kurdish Jews, Mountain Jews, and Georgian Jews form a close genetic cluster. When examined at a more detailed level, the groups can be separated from each other. This cluster plots between Levantine and Northern West Asian populations. Syrian and North African Jews are separate from it and closer to the Sephardi Jews. Yemenite Jews are distinct from other Jewish groups and cluster with the non-Jewish population of the Arabian Peninsula.

=== 2017–present ===
In 2022, a three-year-long study that analyzed the DNA from the remains of 38 individuals from an excavated Jewish cemetery in Erfurt dating to the 14th century found that the medieval Erfurt Ashkenazi community was more genetically diverse than modern Ashkenazi Jews. The medieval Erfurt community was found to consist of two groups, one which had more Eastern European ancestry than modern Ashkenazi Jews and another with more Middle Eastern ancestry which was also genetically close to German and French Ashkenazi Jews and Turkish Sephardi Jews. The groups also had different levels of oxygen isotopes in their teeth, suggesting they used water sources from different areas in childhood, indicating that one of these groups migrated to Erfurt. These results seem to back up historical research which has suggested that medieval Ashkenazi Jewry was culturally divided between Western Jews, who originally lived in the Rhineland (and who may be the group with more Middle Eastern ancestry), and Eastern Jews, who originally lived in eastern Germany, Austria, Bohemia, Moravia, and Silesia (and who may be the group with more European ancestry). Erfurt lay at the boundary of these communities. The study also found evidence of the historic founder effect of Ashkenazi Jewry, with a third of the individuals sampled found to descend from a single woman along the maternal line. The genome of modern Ashkenazi Jewry was found to appear as a near-even mixture between the two groups, with about 60% of modern Ashkenazi DNA found to come from the group with more Middle Eastern ancestry and 40% found to come from the group with more Eastern European ancestry, suggesting that they eventually merged into a single Ashkenazi culture. The study's admixture models for Erfurt Ashkenazi Jews (EAJ) varied, but the authors concluded that "Under the extensive set of models we studied, the ME [Middle Eastern] ancestry in EAJ is estimated in the range 19%–43% and the Mediterranean European ancestry in the range 37%–65% [the remainder of the European ancestry being Eastern European]. However, the true ancestry proportions could be higher or lower than implied by these ranges." They continued, "Our results therefore should only be interpreted to suggest that AJ ancestral sources have links to populations living in Mediterranean Europe and the Middle East today."

A 2020 genetic study on Bronze Age and Iron Age southern Levantine (Canaanite) remains found evidence of large-scale migration of populations related to those of the Zagros or Caucasus into the southern Levant by the Bronze Age and increasing over time (resulting in a Canaanite population descended from both those migrants and earlier Neolithic Levantine peoples). The findings were found to be consistent with modern-day non-Jewish Arabic-speaking Levantine populations (such as Syrians, Lebanese, Palestinians, and Druze) and Jewish groups (such as Moroccan Sephardi Jews, Ashkenazi Jews, and Iranian Jews), "having 50% or more of their ancestry from people related to groups who lived in the Bronze Age Levant and the Chalcolithic Zagros." Ashkenazi Jews were found to have 41% European admixture and Moroccan Jews were found to have 31% European admixture (using modern English and Tuscan populations as proxies). Ethiopian Jews were found to derive 80% of their ancestry from an East African or Horn African component but also carried some Canaanite-like and Zagros-like ancestry. This does not necessarily mean that any these present-day groups bear direct ancestry from people who lived in the Middle to Late Bronze Age Levant or in Chalcolithic Zagros; rather, it indicates that they have ancestries from populations whose ancient proxy can be related to the Middle East.

A 2017 study by Xue et al., running different tests on Ashkenazi Jewish genomes, found an approximately even mixture of Middle Eastern and European ancestry. They concluded that the true fraction of European ancestry was possibly about 60%, with the remaining 40% being Middle Eastern. The authors estimated the Levant as the most likely source of Middle Eastern ancestry in Ashkenazi Jews, and also estimated that between 60% and 80% of the European ancestry was Southern European, "with the rest being likely Eastern European."

=== 2011–2016 ===
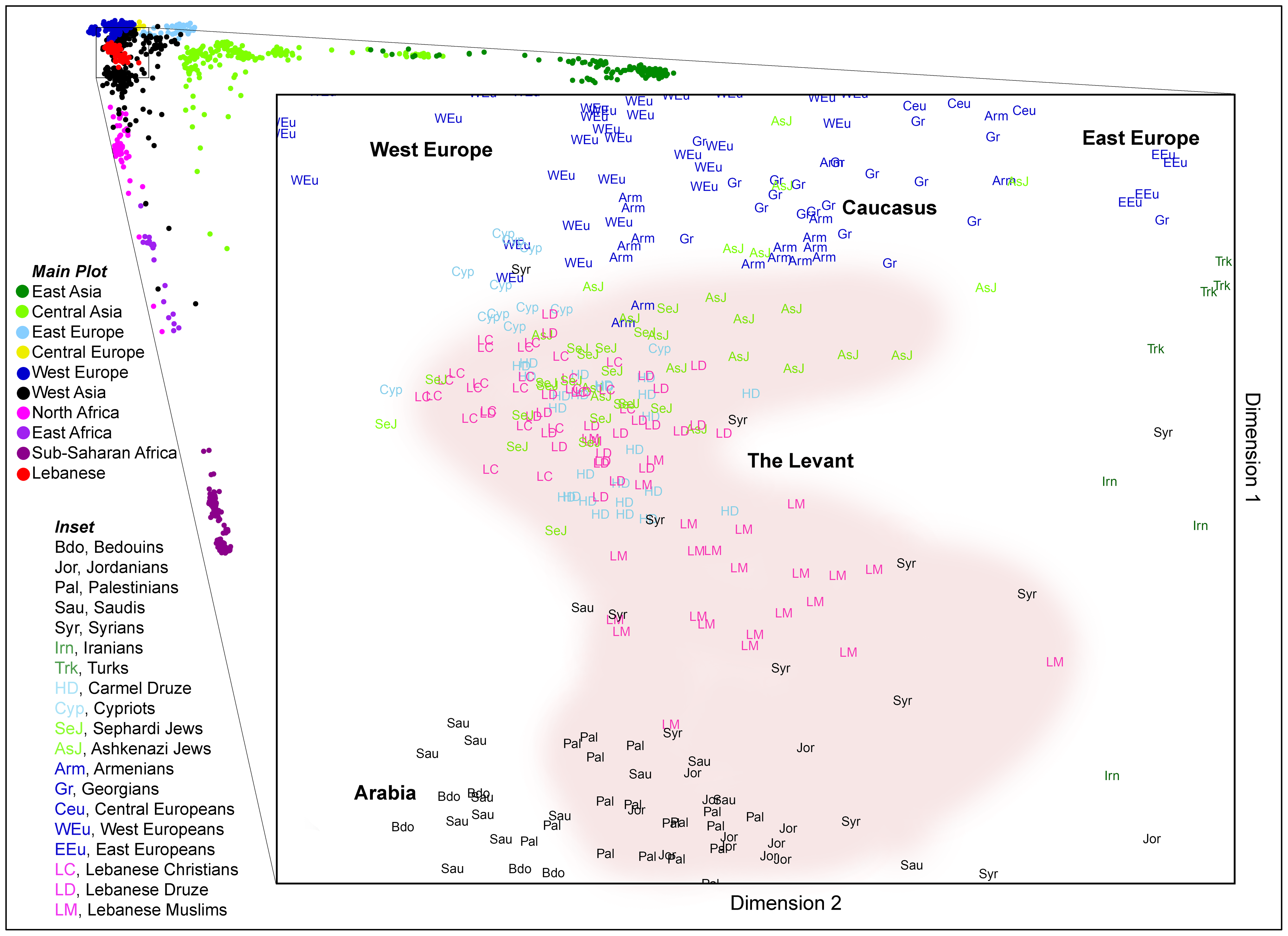
PCA of Jews in comparison to the Near East

In 2011, Moorjani et al. detected 3%–5% sub-Saharan African ancestry in all eight of the diverse Jewish populations (Ashkenazi Jews, Syrian Jews, Iranian Jews, Iraqi Jews, Greek Jews, Turkish Jews, Italian Jews) that they analyzed. The timing of this African admixture among all Jewish populations was identical but not determined. Although African admixture was determined among South Europeans and Near Eastern populations too, this admixture was found to be younger compared to the Jewish populations.

In 2012, two major genetic studies were carried out under the leadership of Harry Ostrer, from the Albert Einstein College of Medicine. The results were published in the Proceedings for the National Academy of Sciences. The genes of 509 Jewish donors from 15 different backgrounds and 114 non-Jewish donors of North African origin were analyzed. Ashkenazi, Sephardi, and Mizrahi Jews were found to be closer genetically to each other than to their long-term host populations, and all were found to have Middle Eastern ancestry, with varying amounts of admixture in their local populations. Mizrahi and Ashkenazi Jews were found to have diverged from each other approximately 2,500 years in the past, approximately the time of the Babylonian exile. The studies also reconfirmed the results of previous studies which found that North African Jews were more closely related to each other and to European and Middle Eastern Jews than to their non-Jewish host populations.

The genome-wide ancestry of North African Jewish groups was compared with respect to European (Basque), Maghrebi (Tunisian non-Jewish), and Middle Eastern (Palestinian) origins. The Middle Eastern component was found to be comparable across all North African Jewish and non-Jewish groups, while North African Jewish groups showed increased European and decreased levels of North African (Maghrebi) ancestry with Moroccan and Algerian Jews tending to be genetically closer to Europeans than Djebar Jews. The study also found that Yemenite, Ethiopian, and Georgian Jews formed their own distinctive, genetically linked clusters. In particular, Yemenite Jews, who had previously been believed to have lived in isolation, were found to have genetic connections to their host population, suggesting some conversion of local Arabs to Judaism had taken place. Georgian Jews were found to share close connections to Iraqi and Iranian Jews, as well as other Middle Eastern Jewish groups. The study found that Syrian Jews share more genetic commonality with Ashkenazi Jews than with other Middle Eastern Jewish populations.

Ostrer also found that Ethiopian Jews are predominantly related to the indigenous populations of Ethiopia, but do have distant genetic links to the Middle East from more than 2,000 years in the past, and are likely descended from a few Jewish founders. Possibly the community began when itinerant Jews settled in Ethiopia in ancient times, and married local women who converted to Judaism.

A 2012 study by Eran Elhaik analyzed data collected for previous studies and concluded that the DNA of Eastern and Central European Jewish populations indicates that their ancestry is "a mosaic of Caucasus, European, and Semitic ancestries". For the study, Bedouins and Jordanian Hashemites, known to descend from Arabian tribes, were assumed to be a valid genetic surrogate of ancient Jews, whereas the Druze, known to come from Syria, were assumed to be non-Semitic immigrants into the Levant. On this basis, a relatively strong connection to the Caucasus was proposed because of the stronger genetic similarity of these Jewish groups to modern Armenians, Georgians, Azerbaijani Jews, Druze and Cypriots, compared to a weaker genetic similarity with Hashemites and Bedouins.

A study by Haber et al. (2013) noted that while previous studies of the Levant, which had focused mainly on diaspora Jewish populations, showed that the "Jews form a distinctive cluster in the Middle East", these studies did not make clear "whether the factors driving this structure would also involve other groups in the Levant". The authors also found a strong correlation between religion and apparent ancestry in the Levant:

all Jews (Sephardi and Ashkenazi) cluster in one branch; Druze from Mount Lebanon and Druze from Mount Carmel are depicted on a private branch; and Lebanese Christians form a private branch with the Christian populations of Armenia and Cyprus placing the Lebanese Muslims as an outer group. The predominantly Muslim populations of Syrians, Palestinians, and Jordanians cluster on branches with other Muslim populations as distant as Morocco and Yemen.

A 2013 study by Doron M. Behar, Mait Metspalu, Yael Baran, Naama M. Kopelman, Bayazit Yunusbayev et al. using integration of genotypes on a newly collected largest data set available to date (1,774 samples from 106 Jewish and non-Jewish populations) for assessment of Ashkenazi Jewish genetic origins from the regions of potential Ashkenazi ancestry concluded that "This most comprehensive study... does not change and in fact reinforces the conclusions of multiple past studies, including ours and those of other groups (Atzmon and others, 2010; Bauchet and others, 2007; Behar and others, 2010; Campbell and others, 2012; Guha and others, 2012; Haber and others; 2013; Henn and others, 2012; Kopelman and others, 2009; Seldin and others, 2006; Tian and others, 2008). We confirm the notion that the Ashkenazi, North African, and Sephardi Jews share substantial genetic ancestry and that they derive it from Middle Eastern and European populations, with no indication of a detectable Khazar contribution to their genetic origins."

The authors also reanalyzed the 2012 study of Eran Elhaik and found that "The provocative assumption that Armenians and Georgians could serve as appropriate proxies for Khazar descendants is problematic for a number of reasons as the evidence for ancestry among Caucasus populations do not reflect Khazar ancestry". Also, the authors found that "Even if it were allowed that Caucasus affinities could represent Khazar ancestry, the use of the Armenians and Georgians as Khazar proxies is particularly poor, as they represent the southern part of the Caucasus region, while the Khazar Khaganate was centered in the North Caucasus and further to the north. Furthermore, among populations of the Caucasus, Armenians and Georgians are geographically the closest to the Middle East, and are therefore expected a priori to show the greatest genetic similarity to Middle Eastern populations." Concerning the similarity of South Caucasus populations to Middle Eastern groups which was observed at the level of the whole genome in one recent study (Yunusbayev and others, 2012), the authors found that "Any genetic similarity between Ashkenazi Jews and Armenians and Georgians might merely reflect a common shared Middle Eastern ancestry component, actually providing further support to a Middle Eastern origin of Ashkenazi Jews, rather than a hint for a Khazar origin". The authors claimed, "If one accepts the premise that similarity to Armenians and Georgians represents Khazar ancestry for Ashkenazi Jews, then by extension one must also claim that Middle Eastern Jews and many Mediterranean European and Middle Eastern populations are also Khazar descendants. This claim is clearly not valid, as the differences among the various Jewish and non-Jewish populations of Mediterranean Europe and the Middle East predate the period of the Khazars by thousands of years".

A 2014 scientific study by geneticists, Shai Carmi, PhD (Hebrew University) et al. published by Nature Communications found that the Ashkenazi Jewish population originates from an even mixture between Middle Eastern and European peoples, descending from 330 to 350 individuals who were genetically about half-Middle Eastern and half-European, making all Ashkenazi Jews related to the point of being at least 30th cousins or closer. According to the authors, this genetic bottleneck likely occurred some 600–800 years in the past, followed by rapid growth and genetic isolation (rate per generation 16–53%). The principal component analysis of common variants in the sequenced AJ samples confirmed previous observations, namely, the proximity of the Ashkenazi Jewish cluster to other Jewish, European, and Middle Eastern populations. This was confirmed by another 2022 genome study by Shamam Waldman PhD (also Hebrew University) et al. published by Cell that modern Ashkenazi Jews descend from a small group, with the original researcher, Shai Carmi, stating, "Whether they're from Israel or New York, the Ashkenazi population today is homogenous genetically."

A 2016 study by Elhaik et al. found that the DNA of Ashkenazi Jews originated in northeastern Turkey. The study found 90% of Ashkenazi Jews could be traced to four ancient villages in northeastern Turkey. The researchers speculated that the Ashkenazi Jews originated in the first millennium, when Iranian Jews converted Greco-Roman, Turkish, Iranian, southern Caucasian, and Slavic populations inhabiting Turkey, and speculated that the Yiddish language also originated there among Jewish merchants as a cryptic language in order to gain advantage in trade along the Silk Road.

Elhaik's findings were promptly refuted by a joint study published in 2016 by a group of geneticists and linguists from the UK, Czech Republic, Russia, and Lithuania; they dismissed both the genetic and linguistic components of Elhaik's article. As for the genetic component, the authors argued that using a genetic "GPS tool" (as used by Elhaik et al.) would place Italians and Spaniards into Greece, all Tunisians and some Kuwaitis would be placed in the Mediterranean Sea, all Greeks were positioned in Bulgaria and in the Black Sea, and all Lebanese were scattered along a line connecting Egypt and the Caucasus; "These cases are sufficient to illustrate that mapping of test individuals has nothing to do with ancestral locations" the authors wrote. As for the linguistic component, the authors stated "Yiddish is a Germanic language, leaving no room for the Slavic relexification hypothesis and for the idea of early Yiddish-Persian contacts in Asia Minor. The study concluded that 'Yiddish is a Slavic language created by Irano-Turko-Slavic Jewish merchants along the Silk Roads as a cryptic trade language, spoken only by its originators to gain an advantage in trade' (Das et al. 2016) remains an assertion in the realm of unsupported speculation", the study concluded.

A 2016 study of Indian Jews from the Bene Israel community by Waldman et al. found that the genetic composition of the community is "unique among Indian and Pakistani populations we analyzed in sharing considerable genetic ancestry with other Jewish populations. Putting together the results from all analyses point to Bene Israel being an admixed population with both Jewish and Indian ancestry, with the genetic contribution of each of these ancestral populations being substantial." The authors also examined the proportion and roots of the shared Jewish ancestry and the local genetic admixture: "In addition, we performed f4-based analysis to test whether Bene Israel are closer to Jews than to non-Jewish Middle-Eastern populations. We found that Middle-Eastern Jewish populations were closer to Bene Israel as compared to other Middle-Eastern populations examined (Druze, Bedouin, and Palestinians). Non-Middle-Eastern Jewish populations were still closer to Bene Israel as compared to Bedouin and Palestinians, but not as compared to Druze. These results further support the hypothesis that the non-Indian ancestry of Bene Israel is Jewish specific, likely from a Middle-Eastern Jewish population."

=== 2001–2010 ===
An autosomal DNA study carried out in 2010 by Atzmon et al. examined the origin of Iranian, Iraqi, Syrian, Turkish, Greek, Sephardic, and Ashkenazi Jewish communities. The study compared these Jewish groups with 1043 unrelated individuals from 52 worldwide populations. To further examine the relationship between Jewish communities and European populations, 2407 European subjects were assigned and divided into 10 groups based on the geographic region of their origin. This study confirmed previous findings of shared Middle Eastern origin of the above Jewish groups and found that "the genetic connections between the Jewish populations became evident from the frequent identity by descent (IBD) across these Jewish groups (63% of all shared segments). Jewish populations shared more and longer segments with one another than with non-Jewish populations, highlighting the commonality of Jewish origin. Among pairs of populations ordered by total sharing, 12 out of the top 20 were pairs of Jewish populations, and "none of the top 30 paired a Jewish population with a non-Jewish one". Atzmon concludes that "Each Jewish group demonstrated Middle Eastern ancestry and variable admixture from host population, while the split between Middle Eastern and European/Syrian Jews, calculated by simulation and comparison of length distributions of IBD segments, occurred 100–150 generations ago, which was described as "compatible with a historical divide that is reported to have occurred more than 2500 years ago" as the Jewish community in Iraq and Iran were formed by Jews in the Babylonian and Persian empires during and after Babylonian exile. The main difference between Mizrahi and Ashkenazi/Sephardic Jews was the absence of Southern European components in the former. According to these results, European/Syrian Jewish populations, including the Ashkenazi Jewish community, were formed later, as a result of the expulsion and migration of Jews from Palestine, during Roman rule. Concerning Ashkenazi Jews, this study found that genetic dates "are incompatible with theories that Ashkenazi Jews are for the most part the direct lineal descendants of converted Khazars or Slavs". Citing Behar, Atzmon states that "Evidence for founder females of Middle Eastern origin has been observed in all Jewish populations based on non-overlapping mitochondrial haplotypes with coalescence times >2000 years". The closest people related to Jewish groups were the Palestinians, Bedouins, Druze, Greeks, and Italians. Regarding this relationship, the authors conclude that "These observations are supported by the significant overlap of Y chromosomal haplogroups between Israeli and Palestinian Arabs with Ashkenazi and non-Ashkenazi Jewish populations".

A 2010 study by Zoossmann-Diskin concluded that based upon the analysis of the X chromosome and seventeen autosomal markers, Eastern European Jewish populations and Jewish populations from Iran, Iraq, and Yemen, do not have the same genetic origins. In particular, concerning Eastern European Jews, he concluded that the evidence points to a dominant amount of southern European, and specifically Italian, ancestry, which he attributed to the conversions to Judaism in ancient Rome which are also supported by historical evidence. Concerning the similarity between Sephardi and Ashkenazi Jews, he stated that the reasons are uncertain but that it is likely to be caused by Sephardic Jews having "Mediterranean basin" ancestry also like the Ashkenazi Jews.

A 2009 study on various European and Near Eastern ethnic groups found Ashkenazi Jews to show closer Genetic distance (Fst) with Italians, Greeks, Germans, and other European groups than what they show with Levantine groups such as Druze and Palestinians. Though it also found that the Ashkenazi Jews were mainly a population "clearly of southern" [Mediterranean] origin", they "appear to have a unique genotypic pattern that may not reflect geographic origins."

A 2009 study by Goldstein et al. shows that it is possible to predict full Ashkenazi Jewish ancestry with 100% sensitivity and 100% specificity, although the exact dividing line between a Jewish and non-Jewish cluster will vary across sample sets which in practice would reduce the accuracy of the prediction. While the full historical demographic explanations for this distinction remain to be resolved, it is clear that the genomes of individuals with full Ashkenazi Jewish ancestry carry an unambiguous signature of their Jewish ancestral DNA, the author suggested that it is more likely to be due to their specific Middle Eastern ancestry than to inbreeding. The authors note that there is almost perfect separation along PC 1, and, they note that most of the non-Jewish Europeans who are closest to the Jews on this PC are of Italian or Eastern Mediterranean origin.

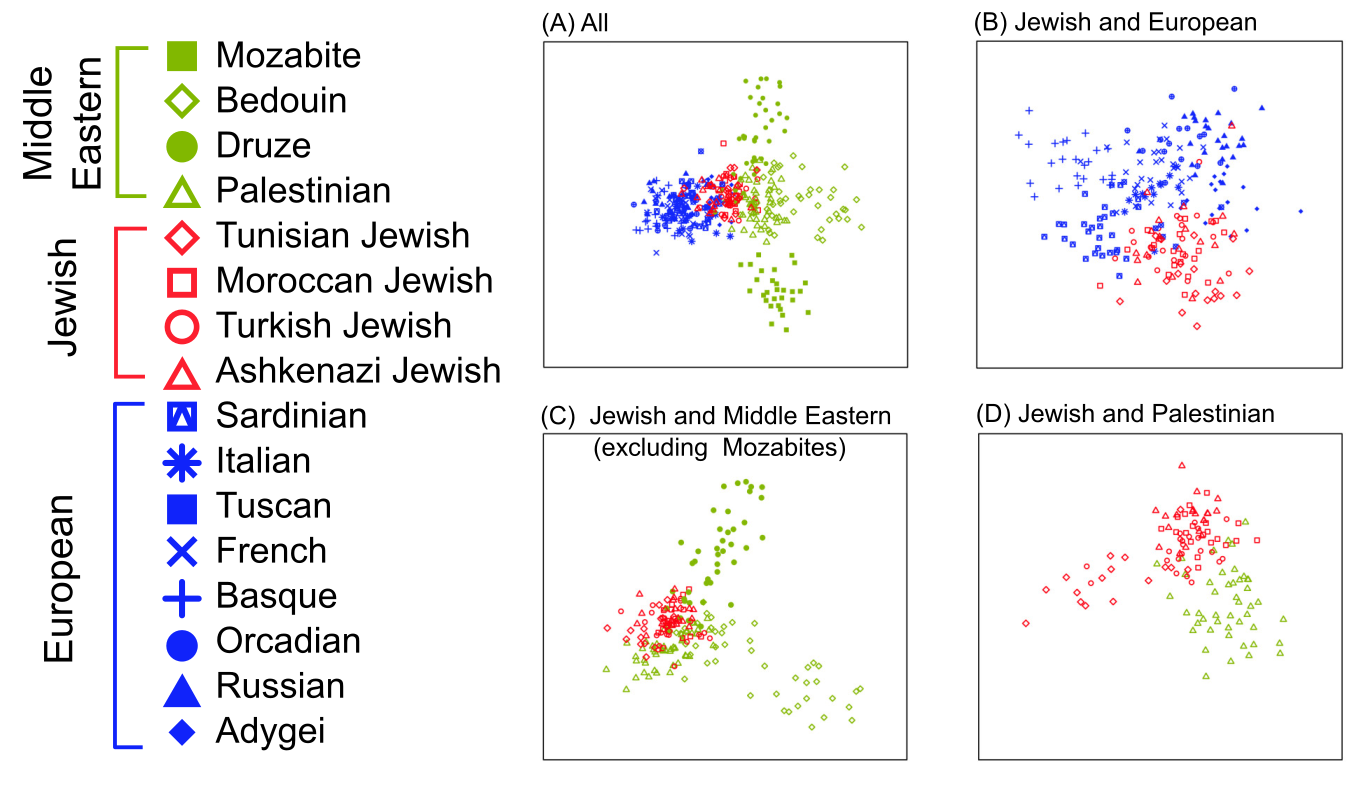
Multidimensional scaling analysis of Middle Eastern, Jewish and European populations

In a 2009 study by Kopelman et al., four Jewish groups, Ashkenazi, Turkish, Moroccan, and Tunisian, were found to share a common origin from the Middle East, with more recent admixture that has resulted in "intermediate placement of the Jewish populations compared to European and Middle Eastern populations". The authors found that "the closest genetic neighbors to most Jewish groups were the Palestinians, Israeli Bedouins, and Druze in addition to the Southern Europeans". The Tunisian Jews were found to be distinct from three other Jewish populations, which suggests, according to the authors, a greater genetic isolation or a significant local Berber ancestry, as in the case of Libyan Jews. Concerning the theory of Khazar ancestry in Ashkenazi Jews, the authors found no direct evidence. Although they did find genetic similarities between Jews, especially Ashkenazi Jews, and the Adyghe people, a group from the Caucasus, whose region was formerly occupied by the Khazars, the Adyghe, living on the edge of geographical Europe, are more genetically related to Middle Easterners, including Palestinians, Bedouin, and non-Ashkenazi Jews, than to Europeans.

Another study by L. Hao et al. studied seven groups of Jewish populations with different geographic origins (Ashkenazi, Italian, Greek, Turkish, Iranian, Iraqi, and Syrian) and showed that the individuals all shared a common Middle Eastern background, although they were also genetically distinguishable from each other. In public comments, Harry Ostrer, the director of the Human Genetics Program at NYU Langone Medical Center, and one of the authors of this study, concluded, "We have shown that Jewishness can be identified through genetic analysis, so the notion of a Jewish people is plausible."

A genome-wide genetic study carried out by Need et al. and published in 2009 showed that "individuals with full Jewish ancestry formed a clearly distinct cluster from those individuals with no Jewish ancestry." The study found that the Jewish cluster examined, fell between that of Middle Eastern and European populations. Reflecting on these findings, the authors concluded, "It is clear that the genomes of individuals with full Ashkenazi Jewish ancestry carry an unambiguous signature of their Jewish heritage, and this seems more likely to be due to their specific Middle Eastern ancestry than to inbreeding."

Autosomal genetic distances (Fst) based on SNPs in Tian et al. (2009)
	Italians	Greeks	Spanish	Tuscans	Germans	Druze	Palestinians	Irish	Swedes	Russians	Basque
Ashkenazi	0.0040	0.0042	0.0056	0.0066	0.0072	0.0088	0.0093	0.0109	0.0120	0.0137	0.0144

The current study extends the analysis of the European population genetic structure to include additional southern European groups and Arab populations. While the Ashkenazi are clearly of southern origin based on both PCA and STRUCTURE studies, in this analysis of diverse European populations, this group appears to have a unique genotypic pattern that may not reflect geographic origins.

A 2008 study by Price et al. sampled Southern Italians, Jews, and other Europeans, and isolated the genetic markers that are most accurate for distinguishing between European groups, achieving results comparable to those from genome-wide analyses. It mines much larger datasets (more markers and more samples) to identify a panel of 300 highly ancestry-informative markers that accurately distinguish not just northwest and southeast European, but also Ashkenazi Jewish ancestry from Southern Europeans.

A 2008 study by Tian et al. provides an additional example of the same clustering pattern, using samples and markers similar to those in their other study. European population genetic substructure was examined in a diverse set of >1,000 individuals of European descent, each genotyped with >300 K SNPs. Both STRUCTURE and principal component analyses (PCA) showed the largest division/principal component (PC) differentiated northern from southern European ancestry. A second PC further separated Italian, Spanish, and Greek individuals from those of Ashkenazi Jewish ancestry as well as distinguishing among northern European populations. In separate analyses of northern European participants other substructure relationships were discerned showing a west-to-east gradient.

In June 2010, Behar et al. "shows that most Jewish samples form a remarkably tight subcluster with common genetic origin, that overlies Druze and Cypriot samples but not samples from other Levantine populations or paired Diaspora host populations. In contrast, Ethiopian Jews (Beta Israel) and Indian Jews (Bene Israel and Cochini) cluster with neighboring autochthonous populations in Ethiopia and western India, respectively, despite a clear paternal link between the Bene Israel and the Levant." "The most parsimonious explanation for these observations is a common genetic origin, which is consistent with an historical formulation of the Jewish people as descending from ancient Hebrew and Israelite residents of the Levant." The authors say that the genetic results are concordant "with the dispersion of the people of ancient Israel throughout the Old World". Regarding the samples he used, Behar says, "Our conclusion favoring common ancestry (of Jewish people) over recent admixture is further supported by the fact that our sample contains individuals that are known not to be admixed in the most recent one or two generations."

A study led by Harry Ostrer published on 11 June 2010, found close links between Ashkenazi, Sephardi, and Mizrahi Jews, and found them to be genetically distinct from non-Jews. In the study, DNA from the blood of 237 Jews and about 2,800 non-Jews was analyzed, and it was determined how closely related they were through IBD. Individuals within the Ashkenazi, Sephardi, and Mizrahi groups shared high levels of IBD, roughly equivalent to that of fourth or fifth cousins. All three groups shared many genetic features, suggesting a common origin dating back more than 2,000 years. The study did find that all three Jewish groups did show various signs of admixture with non-Jews, with the genetic profiles of Ashkenazi Jews indicating between 30% and 60% admixture with Europeans, although they clustered more closely with Sephardi and Mizrahi Jews.

In July 2010, Bray et al., using SNP microarray techniques and linkage analysis, found that Ashkenazi Jews clustered between Middle Eastern and European populations but found a closer relationship between the Ashkenazim and several European populations (Tuscans, Italians, and French) than between the Ashkenazi Jews and Middle Eastern populations and that European admixture "is considerably higher than previous estimates by studies that used the Y chromosome." They add their study data "support the model of a Middle Eastern origin of the Ashkenazim population followed by subsequent admixture with host Europeans or populations more similar to Europeans," and that their data imply that modern Ashkenazi Jews are possibly more similar to Europeans than modern Middle Easterners. The level of admixture with European populations was estimated at between 35% and 55%. The study assumed Druze and Palestinian Arab populations to represent the reference to the world Jewry ancestor genome. With this reference point, the linkage disequilibrium in the Ashkenazi Jewish population was interpreted as "matches signs of interbreeding or 'admixture' between Middle Eastern and European populations". Also, in their press release, Bray stated: "We were surprised to find evidence that Ashkenazi Jews have higher heterozygosity than Europeans, contradicting the widely-held presumption that they have been a largely isolated group". The authors said that their calculations might have "overestimated the level of admixture" as it is possible that the true Jewish ancestors were genetically closer to Southern Europeans than to Druze and Palestinian Arabs. They predicted that using the non-Ashkenazi Jewish Diaspora populations as a reference for a world Jewry ancestor genome would "underestimate the level of admixture" but that "however, using the Jewish Diaspora populations as the reference Jewish ancestor will naturally underestimate the true level of admixture, as the modern Jewish Diaspora has also undergone admixture since their dispersion.

A 2007 study by Bauchet et al. found that Ashkenazi Jews were most closely clustered with Arabic North African populations when compared to the global population of that study. In the European structure analysis, they share genetic similarities with Greeks and Sicilians, reflecting their east Mediterranean origins.

A 2006 study by Seldin et al. used over five thousand autosomal SNPs to demonstrate the European genetic substructure. The results showed "a consistent and reproducible distinction between 'northern' and 'southern' European population groups". Most northern, central, and eastern Europeans (Finns, Swedes, English, Irish, Germans, and Ukrainians) showed >90% in the 'northern' population group, while most individual participants with southern European ancestry (Italians, Greeks, Portuguese, Spaniards) showed >85% in the 'southern' group. Both Ashkenazi Jews as well as Sephardic Jews showed >85% membership in the "southern" group. Referring to the Jews clustering with southern Europeans, the authors state the results were "consistent with a later Mediterranean origin of these ethnic groups".

An initial study conducted in 2001 by Noah Rosenberg and colleagues on six Jewish populations (Poland, Libya, Ethiopia, Iraq, Morocco, Yemen) and two non-Jewish populations (Palestinians and Druze) showed that while the eight groups had genetic links to each other, the Jews of Libya have a distinct genetic signature related to their genetic isolation and possible admixture with Berber populations. (Note: "This population has a unique history among North African Jewish communities, including an early founding, a harsh bottleneck, possible admixture with local Berbers, limited contact with other Jewish communities, and small size in the recent past." (Rosenberg et al., 2001)) This same study suggested a close relationship between the Jews of Yemen and those of Ethiopia.

== Paternal line ==
Haplogroup J1 (Y-DNA) distribution map

=== Summary ===
Approximately 35% to 43% of Jewish men are in the paternal line known as haplogroup J (Note: This haplogroup was called Eu9/Eu10, Med or HG9 before 2002) and its sub-haplogroups. This haplogroup is particularly present in the Middle East and Southern Europe. 15% to 30% are in haplogroup E1b1b, (Note: E1b1b Haplogroup was called E3b before 2008 and was called EU4 or HG25 before 2002 (Cf. Conversion table for Y chromosome haplogroups); this haplogroup is equivalent with haplotype V, as defined by Lucotte) (or E-M35) and its sub-haplogroups which is common in the Middle East, North Africa, and Southern Europe. The Mediterranean haplogroup T1a1 is found in varying percentages depending on the Jewish group studied but with upward of 15 to 3% with the highest frequency within Jewish communities native to the Fertile Crescent and East Africa.

Haplogroup J2 (Y-DNA) distribution map

Studies of Levites and Cohanim provide further insights into Jewish paternal heritage. The Cohanim lineage, traditionally associated with priestly descent, has been linked to the Cohen Modal Haplotype (CMH), first identified by Skorecki et al. in 1997. This haplotype, found in a significant proportion of Cohanim, suggests descent from a single male ancestor approximately 3,000 years ago. A 2009 study by Hammer et al. refined this understanding, identifying J-P58 (or J1E) as the most common haplogroup among Cohanim, accounting for 46.1% of their lineages. These findings confirm a distinct paternal lineage among Cohanim, consistent with biblical accounts of priestly descent.

Ashkenazi Jews, while showing minor European genetic input (~12–23%), remain closer to Middle Eastern and Sephardi Jews than to European populations. A study on Levites highlighted a high proportion (~50%) of haplogroup R1a-M582, which further indicates a Near Eastern origin rather than European ancestry. These genetic findings, together with broader studies of Y-DNA haplogroups frequencies, suggest a shared Middle Eastern origin across Jewish populations, shaped by migrations, isolation, and limited admixture with host populations.

=== Y-DNA Studies on Jewish Lineages ===
In 1992, G. Lucotte and F. David were the first genetic researchers to have documented a common paternal genetic heritage between Sephardi and Ashkenazi Jews. Another study published just a year later suggested the Middle Eastern origin of Jewish paternal lineages.

In 2000, M. Hammer, et al. conducted a study on 1,371 men and definitively established that part of the paternal gene pool of Jewish communities in Europe, North Africa, and the Middle East came from a common Middle East ancestral population. They suggested that most Jewish communities in the Diaspora remained relatively isolated and endogamous compared to non-Jewish neighbor populations.

Investigations by Nebel et al. on the Y-haplotypes (paternal lineages) of Ashkenazi Jews, Kurdish and Sephardi (North Africa, Turkey, Iberian Peninsula, Iraq and Syria) indicate that Jews are more genetically similar to groups in the northern Fertile Crescent (Kurds, Turks and Armenians) than their Arab neighbors, and suggest that some of this difference might be due to migration and admixture from the Arabian peninsula during the last two millennia (into certain current Arabic-speaking populations). Considering the timing of this origin, the study found that "the common genetic Middle Eastern background (of Jewish populations) predates the ethnogenesis in the region and concludes that the Y chromosome pool of Jews is an integral part of the genetic landscape of the Middle East. The study nevertheless found a high degree of overall similarity between Jewish and local Arab groups.

Lucotte et al. 2003 study found that (Oriental, Sephardic, Ashkenazic Jews and Lebanese and Palestinians), "seem to be similar in their Y-haplotype patterns, both with regard to the haplotype distributions and the ancestral haplotype VIII frequencies." The authors stated in their findings that these results confirm similarities in the Y-haplotype frequencies of these Near-Eastern populations, sharing a common geographic origin.

In a study of Israeli Jews from some different groups (Ashkenazi Jews, Kurdish Jews, North African Sephardi Jews, and Iraqi Jews) and Palestinian Muslim Arabs, more than 70% of the Jewish men and 82% of the Arab men whose DNA was studied had inherited their Y chromosomes from the same paternal ancestors, who lived in the region within the last few thousand years. "Our recent study of high-resolution microsatellite haplotypes demonstrated that a substantial portion of Y chromosomes of Jews (70%) and of Palestinian Muslim Arabs (82%) belonged to the same chromosome pool." Kurdish, North African Sephardi, and Iraqi Jews were found to be genetically indistinguishable while slightly but significantly differing from Ashkenazi Jews. In relation to the region of the Fertile Crescent, the same study noted; "In comparison with data available from other relevant populations in the region, Jews were found to be more closely related to groups in the north of the Fertile Crescent (Kurds, Turks, and Armenians) than to their Arab neighbors", which the authors suggested was due to migration and admixture from the Arabian Peninsula into certain current Arabic-speaking populations during the period of Islamic expansion.

=== Y-DNA of Ashkenazi Jews ===
The Y chromosome of most Ashkenazi and Sephardi Jews contains mutations that are common among Middle Eastern peoples, but uncommon in the general European population, according to a study of haplotypes of the Y chromosome by Michael Hammer, Harry Ostrer and others, published in 2000. According to Hammer et al. this suggests that the paternal lineages of Ashkenazi Jews could be traced mostly to the Middle East.

In Ashkenazi (and Sephardi) Jews, the most common paternal lineages generally are E1b1b, J2, and J1, with others found at lesser rates.

Hammer et al. add that "Diaspora Jews from Europe, Northwest Africa, and the Near East resemble each other more closely than they resemble their non-Jewish neighbors." In addition, the authors have found that the "Jewish cluster was interspersed with the Palestinian and Syrian populations, whereas the other Middle Eastern non-Jewish populations (Saudi Arabians, Lebanese, and Druze) closely surrounded it. Of the Jewish populations in this cluster, the Ashkenazim were closest to South European populations (specifically the Greeks) and they were also closest to the Turks." The study estimated that on their paternal side, Ashkenazi Jews are descended from a core population of approximately 20,000 Jews who migrated from Italy into the rest of Europe over the course of the first millennium, and it also estimated that "All European Jews seem connected on the order of fourth or fifth cousins." The study also maintained that the paternal lines of Roman Jews were close to those of Ashkenazi Jews. It asserts that these mostly originated from the Middle East.

The estimated cumulative total male genetic admixture amongst Ashkenazim was, according to Hammer et al., "very similar to Motulsky's average estimate of 12.5%. This could be the result, for example, of "as little as 0.5% per generation, over an estimated 80 generations", according to Hammer et al. Such figures indicated that there had been a "relatively minor contribution" to Ashkenazi paternal lineages by converts to Judaism and non-Jews. These figures, however, were based on a limited range of paternal haplogroups assumed to have originated in Europe. When potentially European haplogroups were included in the analysis, the estimated admixture increased to 23 percent (±7%). (Note: The authors have chosen the Bertorelle and Excoffier statistical method. Two results have been obtained depending on the assumption of the parental Jewish population and the parental European population. For the first "admixture calculation" (12.5%), the putative original population is Med haplotype (equivalent to J haplogroup) and the parental European population is 1L haplotype (equivalent to R1b haplogroup). For the second "admixture calculation" (23%) the putative parental Jewish population is the haplotype frequencies average between North African, Near Eastern, Yemenite, and Kurdish Jewish samples and the parental European population is the haplotype frequencies average between German, Austrian, and Russian samples. Besides, Motulsky's average estimate of 12.5% is based on 18 classical genetic markers.)

The frequency of haplogroup R1b in the Ashkenazim population is similar to the frequency of R1b in Middle Eastern populations. This is significant because R1b is also the most common haplogroup amongst non-Jewish males in Western Europe. That is, the commonness of nominally Middle Eastern subclades of R1b amongst Ashkenazim tends to minimize the Western European contribution to the ~10% of R1b found amongst Ashkenazim. A large study by Behar et al. (2004) of Ashkenazi Jews records a percentage of 5–8% European contribution to the Ashkenazi paternal gene pool. (Note: The calculation is performed using haplogroups J* and R1b1 to represent Western European contribution, and R1a1 as a potential Eastern European contribution.) In the words of Behar:

Because haplogroups R-M17 (R1a) and R-P25 (R1b) are present in non-Ashkenazi Jewish populations (e.g., at 4% and 10%, respectively) and in non-Jewish Near Eastern populations (e.g., at 7% and 11%, respectively; Hammer et al. 2000; Nebel et al. 2001), it is likely that they were also present at low frequency in the AJ (Ashkenazi Jewish) founding population. The admixture analysis shown in Table 6 suggests that 5%–8% of the Ashkenazi gene pool is, indeed, comprised of Y chromosomes that may have introgressed from non-Jewish European populations.

For G. Lucotte et al., the R1b frequency is about 11%. (Note: Lucotte uses a different method from that used by most researchers in genetics since 2002, it is called RFLP (Restriction Fragment Length Polymorphism): TaqI/p49af. It is difficult to make a rapprochement with the haplogroups defined by the YCC. Both methods give similar results (see reported results given here)) In 2004, when the calculation was made excluding Jews from the Netherlands the R1b rate was 5% ± 11.6%.

Two studies by Nebel et al. in 2001 and 2005, based on Y chromosome polymorphic markers, suggested that Ashkenazi Jews are more closely related to other Jewish and Middle Eastern groups than they are to their host populations in Europe (defined in the using Eastern European, German, and French Rhine Valley populations). Ashkenazi, Sephardic, and Kurdish Jews were all very closely related to the populations of the Fertile Crescent, even closer than to Arabs. The study speculated that the ancestors of the Arab populations of the Levant might have diverged due to mixing with migrants from the Arabian Peninsula. However, 11.5% of male Ashkenazim, and more specifically 50% of the Levites while 1.7% of the Cohanim, were found to belong to R1a1a (R-M17), the dominant Y chromosome haplogroup in Eastern European populations. They hypothesized that these chromosomes could reflect low-level gene flow from surrounding Eastern European populations, or, alternatively, that both the Ashkenazi Jews with R1a1a (R-M17), and to a much greater extent Eastern European populations in general, might partly be descendants of Khazars. They concluded, "However, if the R1a1a (R-M17) chromosomes in Ashkenazi Jews do indeed represent the vestiges of the mysterious Khazars then, according to our data, this contribution was limited to either a single founder or a few closely related men, and does not exceed ~12% of the present-day Ashkenazim." This hypothesis is also supported by David B. Goldstein in his book Jacob's legacy: A genetic view of Jewish history. However, Faerman (2008) states that "External low-level gene flow of possible Eastern European origin has been shown in Ashkenazim but no evidence of a hypothetical Khazars' contribution to the Ashkenazi gene pool has ever been found." A 2017 study, concentrating on the Ashkenazi Levites where the proportion reaches 50%, while signaling that there's a "rich variation of haplogroup R1a outside of Europe which is phylogenetically separate from the typically European R1a branches", notes that the particular R1a-Y2619 sub-clade testifies for a local origin, and that the "Middle Eastern origin of the Ashkenazi Levite lineage based on what was previously a relatively limited number of reported samples, can now be considered firmly validated."

Furthermore, 7% of Ashkenazi Jews have the haplogroup G2c, which is mainly found among the Pashtuns and on a lower scale, it is mainly found among members of all major Jewish ethnic groups, Palestinians, Syrians, and Lebanese. Behar et al. suggest that those haplogroups are minor Ashkenazi founding lineages.

Among Ashkenazi Jews, the Jews of the Netherlands seem to have a particular distribution of haplogroups since nearly one quarter of them have the Haplogroup R1b1 (R-P25), in particular sub-haplogroup R1b1b2 (R-M269), which is characteristic of Western European populations.

Ashkenazi men show a low level of Y-DNA diversity within each major haplogroup, which means that compared to the size of the modern population, it seems that there once was a relatively small number of men having children. This possibly results from a series of founder events and high rates of endogamy within Europe. Despite Ashkenazi Jews representing a recently founded population in Europe, founding effects suggest that they probably derived from a large and diverse ancestral source population in the Middle East, who may have been larger than the source population from which the non-Jewish Europeans derived.

Y-DNA haplogroup distribution among Ashkenazim
Study	Sample number	CT										
Study	Sample number	E-M35 (E1b1b1)		GHIJK								
Study	Sample number	E-M35 (E1b1b1)		G2c-M377	IJK							
Study	Sample number	E-M35 (E1b1b1)		G2c-M377	J-M304				P-P295			
Study	Sample number	E-M78 (E1b1b1a)	E-M123 (E1b1b1c)	G2c-M377	J-M304				Q-M378 (Q1b)	R1-M173		
Study	Sample number	E-M78 (E1b1b1a)	E-M123 (E1b1b1c)	G2c-M377	J1-M267	J*	J2-M172		Q-M378 (Q1b)	R-M17 (R1a1a)	R1b1 (P25)	
Study	Sample number	E-M78 (E1b1b1a)	E-M123 (E1b1b1c)	G2c-M377	J1-M267	J*	J-M410 (J2a*)	J-M67 (J2a1b)	Q-M378 (Q1b)	R-M17 (R1a1a)	R-M269 (R1b1b2)	R1b1* (P25)
Hammer 2009	large (Note: The study has been carried out on 1,575 Jews representative of the Diaspora. The authors give the haplogroup distribution without the proportion of Ashkenazi/non-Ashkenazi)	~3%	~17%	~7%	~17%		~6%	~14%	~7%	~12%	~9%	~2%
Behar 2004	442	16.1%		7.7%	19%		19%		5.2%	7.5%	10%	
Semino 2004	~80	5.2%	11.7%	Not tested	14.6%		12.2%	9.8%	Not tested	Not tested	Not tested	
Nebel 2001	79	23%		?	19%		24%		?	12.7%	11.4%	
Shen 2004	20	10%	10%	5%	20%	5%		15%	5%	20%	10%	

=== Y-DNA of Sephardic Jews ===
The first largest study on the Jews of North Africa was led by Gerard Lucotte et al. in 2003. This study showed that the Jews of North Africa (Note: Sephardi population studied is as follows: 58 Jews from Algeria, 190 Morocco, Tunisia 64, 49 of the island of Djerba 9 of 11 from Libya and Egypt is 381 people (Lucotte 2003)) showed frequencies of their paternal haplotypes almost equal to those of the Lebanese and Palestinian non-Jews. The authors also compared the distribution of haplotypes of Jews from North Africa with Sephardi Jews, Ashkenazi Jews, and "Oriental" (Mizrahi) Jews, and found significant differences between the Ashkenazim and Mizrahim and the other two groups.

The Jewish community of the island of Djerba in Tunisia is of special interest, Tradition traces this community's origins back to the time of the destruction of Solomon's Temple. Two studies have attempted to test this hypothesis first by G. Lucotte et al. from 1993, the second of F. Manni et al. of 2005. They also conclude that the Jews of Djerba's paternal gene pool is different from the Arabs and Berbers of the island. For the first 77.5% of samples tested are of haplotype VIII (probably similar to the J haplogroup according Lucotte), the second shows that 100% of the samples are of Haplogroup J *. The second suggests that it is unlikely that the majority of this community comes from an ancient colonization of the island while for Lucotte it is unclear whether this high frequency is really an ancient relationship. These studies therefore suggest that the paternal lineage of North African Jews comes predominantly from the Middle East with a minority contribution of African lineages, probably Berbers.

A 2026 study by Levy-Toledano et al. focused on Moroccan Jews, who partially descend from Sephardic Jews. Its results suggest predominantly Middle Eastern origins for Moroccan Jews' paternal lines and only a small proportion originating from Berbers. The Moroccan Jewish lineages "AB-022" (J1-ZS227-ZS222), "AB-036" (J1-Z18297-ZS4292), "AB-047" (J2a-L25-FGC4992), and "AB-158" (E1b-M84-S16614) are put forward as Levantine as origin.

A study by Inês Nogueiro et al. (July 2009) on the Jews of north-eastern Portugal (region of Trás-os-Montes) showed that their paternal lines consisted of 35.2% lineages more typical of Europe (R : 31.7%, I : 3.5%), and 64.8% lineages more typical of the Near East than Europe (E1b1b: 8.7%, G: 3.5%, J: 36.8%, T: 15.8%) and consequently, the Portuguese Jews of this region were genetically closer to other Jewish populations than to Portuguese non-Jews.

Paternal lineages in north-eastern Portuguese Jewish communities
Sample number	E-M78	E-M81	E-M34	G	I	J1	J2	T	R1a	R1b1b1	R1b1b1b2
57	3.5%	5.2%	0%	3.5%	3.5%	12.3%	24.5%	15.8%	1.8%	1.8%	28.1%

=== Y-DNA of Mizrahi Jews ===
In the article by Nebel et al. the authors show that Kurdish and Sephardi Jews have indistinguishable paternal genetic heritage, with both being similar to but slightly differing from Ashkenazi Jews (possibly due to a low-level European admixture or a genetic drift during isolation among Ashkenazim). The study shows that mixtures between Kurdish Jews and their Muslim hosts are negligible and Kurdish Jews are closer to other Jewish groups than they are to their long-term host population. Hammer had already shown the strong correlation between the genetic heritage of Jews from North Africa with Kurdish Jews. Sample size 9/50 – 18% haplogroup T1.

A 2002 study by geneticist Dror Rosengarten found that the paternal haplotypes of Mountain Jews "were shared with other Jewish communities and were consistent with a Mediterranean origin." A 2016 study by Karafet at all found, with a sample of 17, 11.8% of Mountain Jewish men tested in Dagestan's Derbentsky District to belong to Haplogroup T-P77.

The studies of Shen and Hammer et al. show that the paternal genes of Yemenite Jews are very similar to those of other Jewish populations. They include Y haplogroups A3b2, E3b3a, E3b1, E3b1b, J1a, J2e, R1b10, and the lowest frequency found was Haplogroup T-M184 2/94 2.1% in one sample.

=== Y-DNA of Ethiopian Jews ===
A study by Lucotte and Smets has shown that the genetic father of Beta Israel (Ethiopian Jews) was close to the Ethiopian non-Jewish populations. This is consistent with the theory that Beta Israel are descendants of ancient inhabitants of Ethiopia, not the Middle East.

Hammer et al. (2000) and the team of Shen in 2004 arrive at similar conclusions, namely a genetic differentiation in – other people in the north of Ethiopia, which probably indicates a conversion of local populations.

A study by Behar et al. (2010) on the Beta Israel showed similar Middle Eastern genetic clustering to Semitic-speaking Ethiopian non-Jewish Tigrayans and Amharas, but more than Cushitic-speaking non-Jewish Ethiopian Oromos.

=== Y-DNA of Indian Jews ===
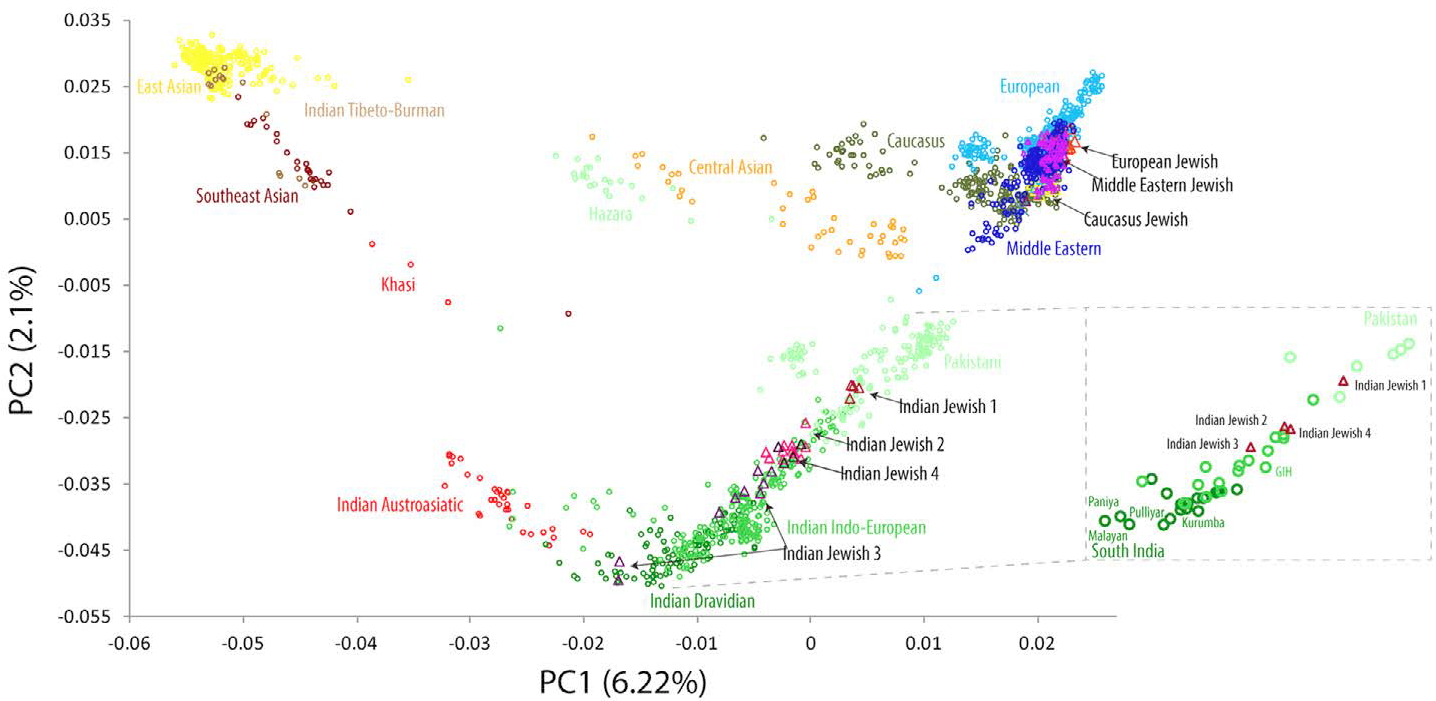
Principal component analysis (PCA) of the combined autosomal SNP data of individuals from Eurasia

Genetic analysis shows that the Bene Israel of India cluster with the Indigenous populations of western India, but do have a clear paternal link to the populations of the Levant. A recent more detailed study on Indian Jews has reported that the paternal ancestry of Indian Jews is composed of Middle East specific haplogroups (E, G, J(xJ2) and I) as well as common South Asian haplogroups (R1a, H, L-M11, R2).

=== Priestly families ===
==== Cohanim ====
Nephrologist Karl Skorecki decided to analyze the Cohanim to see if they were the descendants of one man, in which case they should have a set of common genetic markers.

To test this hypothesis, he contacted Michael Hammer of the University of Arizona, a researcher in molecular genetics and a pioneer in research on chromosomes. Their article, published in Nature in 1997, has had some impact. A set of special markers (called Cohen Modal Haplotype or CMH) was defined as one which is more likely to be present in the Cohanim, defined as contemporary Jews named Cohen or a derivative, and it was proposed that this results from a common descent from the ancient priestly lineage rather than from the Jewish population in general.

But, subsequent studies showed that the number of genetic markers used and the number of samples (of people saying Cohen) were not big enough. The last study, conducted in 2009 by Hammer and Behar et al., says 20 of the 21 Cohen haplogroups have no single common young haplogroup; five haplogroups comprise 79.5% of all haplogroups of Cohen. Among these first 5 haplogroups, J-P58 (or J1E) accounts for 46.1% of Cohen, and the second major haplogroup, J-M410 or J2a accounts for 14.4%. Hammer and Behar have redefined an extended CMH haplotype as determined by a set of 12 markers and having a "background" haplogroup determining the most important lines J1E (46.1%). This haplotype was absent among non-Jews in 2009 analyzed in the study. This divergence would appear to be from 3000 ± 1000 years ago. This study nevertheless confirms that the current Cohen lineage descended from a small number of paternal ancestors.

In the summary of their findings, the authors concluded that "Our estimates of the coalescence time also lend support to the hypothesis that the extended CMH represents a unique founding lineage of the ancient Hebrews that has been paternally inherited along with the Jewish priesthood."

Molecular phylogenetics research published in 2013 and 2016 for Levant haplogroup J1 (J-M267) places the Y-chromosomal Aaron within subhaplogroup Z18271, age estimate 2638–3280 years Before Present (yBP).

==== Levites ====
A 2003 study of the Y-chromosome by Behar et al. pointed to multiple origins for Ashkenazi Levites, a priestly class who comprise approximately 4% of Ashkenazi Jews. It found that Haplogroup R1a1a (R-M17), which is uncommon in the Middle East or among Sephardi Jews, but dominant in Eastern Europe, is present in over 50% of Ashkenazi Levites, while the rest of Ashkenazi Levites' paternal lineage is of apparent Middle Eastern origin. Behar suggested a founding event, probably involving one or very few European men, occurring at a time close to the initial formation and settlement of the Ashkenazi community as a possible explanation. Nebel, Behar and Goldstein speculated that this may indicate a Khazar origin.

However, a 2013 study by Rootsi, Behar et al. found that R1a-M582, the specific subclade of R1a to which all sampled Ashkenazi Levites with R1a belonged, was completely absent from a sample of 922 Eastern Europeans and was only found in one of the 2,164 samples from the Caucasus, while it made up 33.8% of non-Levite Ashkenazi R1a and was also found in 5.9% of Near Easterners bearing R1a. The clade, though less represented in Near Easterners, was more diverse among them than among Ashkenazi Jews. Rootsi et al. argued this supports a Near Eastern Hebrew origin for the paternal lineage R1a present among Ashkenazi Levites: R1a-M582 was also found among different Iranian populations, among Kurds from Cilician Anatolia and Kazakhstan, and among non-Ashkenazi Jews.

Previous Y-chromosome studies have demonstrated that Ashkenazi Levites, members of a paternally inherited Jewish priestly caste, display a distinctive founder event within R1a, the most prevalent Y-chromosome haplogroup in Eastern Europe. Here we report the analysis of 16 whole R1 sequences and show that a set of 19 unique nucleotide substitutions defines the Ashkenazi R1a lineage. While our survey of one of these, M582, in 2,834 R1a samples reveals its absence in 922 Eastern Europeans, we show it is present in all sampled R1a Ashkenazi Levites, as well as in 33.8% of other R1a Ashkenazi Jewish males and 5.9% of 303 R1a Near Eastern males, where it shows considerably higher diversity. Moreover, the M582 lineage also occurs at low frequencies in non-Ashkenazi Jewish populations. In contrast to the previously suggested Eastern European origin for Ashkenazi Levites, the current data are indicative of a geographic source of the Levite founder lineage in the Near East and its likely presence among pre-Diaspora Hebrews.

== Maternal line ==
=== Summary ===
Studies of mitochondrial DNA of Jewish populations are more recent and are still debatable. The maternal lineages of Jewish populations, studied by looking at mitochondrial DNA, are generally more heterogeneous. Scholars such as Harry Ostrer and Raphael Falk believe this may indicate that many Jewish males found new mates from European and other communities in the places where they migrated in the diaspora after fleeing ancient Israel. Mitochondrial DNA (mtDNA) studies of Jewish populations reveal diverse maternal lineages with significant regional variations.

For Ashkenazi Jews, approximately 40% of their mtDNA is linked to four female founders potentially of Near Eastern origin, although later research suggests that up to 81% of their maternal ancestry might stem from European women. Some studies propose ancient Near Eastern origins, while others European contributions.

Sephardi Jews exhibit greater diversity in mtDNA, with limited genetic influence from local Berber or Arab populations. Mizrahi Jews, including those from Iraq and Persia, often trace their maternal lines back to a small number of Middle Eastern women.

Ethiopian Jews share genetic characteristics with neighboring African populations, reflecting their regional origins, while Indian Jews, such as the Bene Israel and Cochin Jews, predominantly show indigenous maternal lineages, alongside some shared Jewish genetic markers. Across Jewish communities, genetic studies identify maternal founders dating back over 2,000 years, highlighting genetic bottlenecks and founder effects. These patterns suggest distinct genetic clusters for Ashkenazi, Sephardi, and Mizrahi Jews.

=== Description of the studies ===
According to Thomas et al. in 2002, several Jewish communities reveal direct-line maternal ancestry originating from a few women. This was seen in independently founded communities in different geographic areas. What they shared was limited genetic additions later on the female side. Together, this is described as the founder effect. Those same communities had diversity in the male lines that were similar to the non-Jewish population. Two studies in 2006 and 2008 suggested that about 40% of Ashkenazi Jews originate maternally from four female founders likely of Near-Eastern origin who lived 1,000 years ago, while the populations of Sephardi and Mizrahi Jewish communities "showed no evidence for a narrow founder effect".

Except for Ethiopian Jews and Indian Jews, it has been argued that all of the various Jewish populations have components of mitochondrial genomes that were of Middle Eastern origin. In 2013, however, Costa et al. published work suggesting that an overwhelming majority of Ashkenazi Jewish maternal ancestry, estimated at 65-81% percent of Ashkenazi maternal ancestry from women indigenous to Europe, and around 8 percent from the Near East, suggesting that Jewish males migrated to Europe and took new wives from the local population, and converted them to Judaism, though some geneticists, such as Doron Behar and Karl Skorecki, have expressed disagreement with the study's conclusions. Another study by Eva Fernandez and her colleagues argues that the K lineages (claimed to be European in origin by Costa et al.) in Ashkenazi Jews might have an ancient Near Eastern source.

Reflecting on previous mtDNA studies carried out by Behar, Atzmon et al. conclude that all major Jewish population groups are showing evidence for founder females of Middle Eastern origin with coalescence times >2000 years. The 2013 study by Costa et al., based on a much larger sample base, drew differing conclusions, namely, that the Mt-DNA of Ashkenazi Jews originated among southern European women, where Diaspora communities had been established centuries before the fall of the Second Temple in 70 CE. A 2014 study by Fernandez et al. found that Ashkenazi Jews display a frequency of haplogroup K which suggests an ancient Near Eastern origin, stating that this observation clearly contradicts the results of the study led by Richards which suggested a predominantly European origin for the Ashkenazi community's maternal lines. However, the authors of the 2014 study also state that definitively answering the question of whether this group was of Jewish origin rather than the result of a Neolithic migration to Europe would require the genotyping of the complete mtDNA in ancient Near Eastern populations.

=== MtDNA of Ashkenazi Jews ===
In 2004, Behar et al. found that approximately 32% of Ashkenazi Jews belong to the mitochondrial Haplogroup K, which points to a genetic bottleneck having taken place some 100 generations prior.

A 2006 study by Behar et al., based on high-resolution analysis of Haplogroup K (mtDNA), suggested that about 40% of the current Ashkenazi population is descended matrilineally from just four women, or "founder lineages", likely of mixed European and Middle Eastern origin. They concluded that these founder lineages may have originated in the Middle East in the 1st and 2nd centuries CE, and later underwent expansion in Europe. Moreover, a maternal line "sister" was found among the Jews of Portugal, North Africa, France, and Italy. They wrote:

Both the extent and location of the maternal ancestral deme from which the Ashkenazi Jewry arose remain obscure. Here, using complete sequences of the maternally inherited mitochondrial DNA (mtDNA), we show that close to one-half of Ashkenazi Jews, estimated at 8,000,000 people, can be traced back to only four women carrying distinct mtDNAs that are virtually absent in other populations, with the important exception of low frequencies among non-Ashkenazi Jews. We conclude that four founding mtDNAs, likely of Near Eastern ancestry, underwent major expansion(s) in Europe within the past millennium…

A 2007 study by J. Feder et al. confirmed the hypothesis of the founding of non-European origin among the maternal lines. Their study did not address the geographical origin of Ashkenazim and therefore does not explicitly confirm the origin "Levantine" of these founders. This study revealed a significant divergence in total haplogroup distribution between the Ashkenazi Jewish populations and their European host populations, namely Russians, Poles, and Germans. They concluded that, regarding mtDNAs, the differences between Jews and non-Jews are far larger than those observed among the Jewish communities. The study also found that "the differences between the Jewish communities can be overlooked when non-Jews are included in the comparisons." It supported previous interpretations that, in the direct maternal line, there was "little or no gene flow from the local non-Jewish communities in Poland and Russia to the Jewish communities in these countries."

Considering Ashkenazi Jews, Atzmon (citing Behar above) states that beyond four founder mitochondrial haplogroups of possible Middle Eastern origins which comprise approximately 40% of Ashkenazi Jewish mtDNA, the remainder of the mtDNA falls into other haplogroups, many of European origin. He noted that beyond Ashkenazi Jews, "Evidence for founder females of Middle Eastern origin has been observed in other Jewish populations based on non-overlapping mitochondrial haplotypes with coalescence times >2000 years".

A 2013 study by Costa et al. led by Martin B Richards concluded that 65%-81% of Ashkenazi Mt-DNA is European in origin, including all four founding mothers, and that most of the remaining lineages are also European. The results were published in Nature Communications in October 2013. The team analyzed about 2,500 complete and 28,000 partial Mt-DNA genomes of mostly non-Jews, and 836 partial Mt-DNA genomes of Ashkenazi Jews. The study claims that only 8% of Ashkenazi Mt-DNA could be identified as Middle Eastern in origin, with the origin of the rest being unclear.

They wrote:

If we allow for the possibility that K1a9 and N1b2 might have a Near Eastern source, then we can estimate the overall fraction of European maternal ancestry at ~65%. Given the strength of the case for even these founders having a European source, however, our best estimate is to assign ~81% of Ashkenazi lineages to a European source, ~8% to the Near East, and ~1% further to the east in Asia, with ~10% remaining ambiguous... Thus at least two-thirds and most likely more than four-fifths of Ashkenazi maternal lineages have a European ancestry.

Regarding the origin of Ashkenazi admixture, the analyses suggest that "the first major wave of assimilation probably took place in Mediterranean Europe, most likely in Southern Europe, with substantial further assimilation of minor founders in west/central Europe." According to Richards, who acknowledged past research showing that Ashkenazi Jews' paternal origins are largely from the Middle East, the most likely explanation is that Ashkenazi Jews are descended from Middle Eastern men who moved to Europe and married local women whom they converted to Judaism. The authors found "less evidence for assimilation in Eastern Europe, and almost none for a source in the North Caucasus/Chuvashia, as would be predicted by the Khazar hypothesis."

The study was criticized by geneticist Doron Behar, who stated that while the Mt-DNA of Ashkenazi Jews is of mixed Middle Eastern and European origins, the deepest maternal roots of Ashkenazi Jews are not European. Harry Ostrer said Richards' study seemed reasonable and corresponded to the known facts of Jewish history. Karl Skorecki of the Rambam Health Care Campus stated that there were serious flaws in phylogenetic analysis.

David B. Goldstein, the Duke University geneticist who first found similarities between the founding mothers of Ashkenazi Jewry and European populations, said that, although Richards' analysis was well-done and 'could be right,' the estimate that 80% of Ashkenazi Jewish Mt-DNA is European was not statistically justified given the random rise and fall of mitochondrial DNA lineages. Geneticist Antonio Torroni of the University of Pavia found the conclusions very convincing, adding that recent studies of cell nucleus DNA also show "a very close similarity between Ashkenazi Jews and Italians". Diaspora communities were established in Rome and in Southern Europe centuries before the fall of the Second Temple in 70 CE.

A 2014 study by Fernandez et al. found that Ashkenazi Jews display a frequency of haplogroup K which suggests ancient Middle Eastern origins, stating that this observation contradicts the results of the study led by Richards which suggested a predominantly European origin for the Ashkenazi community's maternal line. However, the authors also state that definitively answering the question of whether this group was of Jewish origin rather than the result of a Neolithic migration to Europe would require the genotyping of the complete mtDNA in ancient Near Eastern populations. On the study by Richards:

According to that work the majority of the Ashkenazi mtDNA lineages can be assigned to three major founders within haplogroup K (31% of their total lineages): K1a1b1a, K1a9 and K2a2. The absence of characteristic mutations within the control region in the PPNB K-haplotypes allows discarding them as members of either sub-clades K1a1b1a or K2a2, both representing 79% of total Ashkenazi K lineages. However, without a high-resolution typing of the mtDNA coding region, it cannot be excluded that the PPNB K lineages belong to the third sub-cluster K1a9 (20% of Ashkenazi K lineages). Moreover, in light of the evidence presented here of a loss of lineages in the Near East since Neolithic times, the absence of Ashkenazi mtDNA founder clades in the Near East should not be taken as a definitive argument for its absence in the past. The genotyping of the complete mtDNA in ancient Near Eastern populations would be required to fully answer this question and it will undoubtedly add resolution to the patterns detected in modern populations in this and other studies.

A 2022 study by Kevin Brook focused on the Mt-DNA of Ashkenazi Jews and used thousands of complete sequences. Brook's study concluded that the Ashkenazi maternal genome has significant roots in both the Middle East and Europe, the most frequent lineages being overwhelmingly of ancient Middle Eastern origin and a large number of uncommon lineages being of heterogenous European origin. Brook found a total of six branches of haplogroup K in Ashkenazim that each represents separate founding women: K1a1b1*, K1a1b1a, K1a4a, K1a9, K2a*, and K2a2a1. He found that K1a9 is shared with Iraqi Jews and with non-Jews in Syria and Iran. K2a2a1 is shared with southern Europeans but is also found among Mizrahi Jews from the Caucasus and is the maternal sister to the Arabian haplogroup K2a2a2. He therefore proposed that K1a9 and K2a2a1 are likely of Hebrew origin. Brook similarly found Near Eastern roots for several more Ashkenazi haplogroups, including R0a2m and U1b1. K1a4a, which is also found in Egyptian Jews, Maghrebi Jews, and Turkish Jews, is interpreted as a lineage that may have come from an ancient Greek or Italian convert to Judaism but also found it in Syria. Several haplogroups are seen as indicating the assimilation of West Slavic women, including V7a and H11b1. The debate over potential Khazar descent was also reexamined. Although Brook did not find any connection to the Chuvash people nor to any of the medieval Khazar samples that have been collected to date, he pinpointed the Ashkenazic branch of N9a3 as the daughter subclade of a variety found among Bashkirs, a Turkic people of the Ural region, and proposes that the former could have come from a Khazar woman, or, alternatively, a woman from China or the North Caucasus.

A 2025 study by Joseph Livni and Karl Skorecki which aimed to disprove the conclusions of Costa et al, created a mathematical model to try to distinguish founder and host population lineages in the Ashkenazi Jewish population. Based on the model the authors propose that fewer than 15% of individuals in the sample carried mtDNA lineages that entered the Ashkenazi population after it was founded. Concerning the origins of those relatively large "founding" haplogroups, the authors also argued that Costa et al. had identified their geographical origins wrongly.

=== MtDNA of Sephardi Jews ===
Analysis of mitochondrial DNA of the Jewish populations of North Africa (Morocco, Tunisia, Libya) was the subject of further detailed study in 2008 by Doron Behar et al. Their text concludes that Jews from this region do not share the haplogroups of the mitochondrial DNA haplogroups (M1 and U6) that are typical of the North African Berber and Arab populations. Behar et al. conclude that it is unlikely that North African Jews have significant Arab, or Berber admixture, "consistent with social restrictions imposed by religious restrictions," or endogamy. This study also found genetic similarities between the Ashkenazi and North African Jews of European mitochondrial DNA pools, but differences between both of these of the diaspora and Jews from the Middle East.

Genetic research by M. Thomas et al. that was based on studying only the hypervariable region 1 (HVS-I) seemed to show that about 26%-27% of Moroccan Jews descend from one female ancestor but when Behar et al. studied their complete mitogenomes they did not find that any one founder of this population had a frequency that high. Behar's study found that 43% of Tunisian Jews are descended from four women along their maternal lines. According to Behar, 39.8% of the mtDNA of Libyan Jews "could be related to one woman carrying the X2e1a1a lineage".

The data (mt-DNA) recovered by D. Behar et al. were from a community descended from crypto-Jews located in the village of Belmonte in Portugal. Because of the small size of the sample and the circumstances of the community having been isolated for so long, It is not possible to generalize the findings to the entire Iberian Peninsula.

There was a relatively high presence of Haplogroup T2e in Sephardim who arrived in Turkey and Bulgaria. This finding suggests that the sub-haplogroup, which resembles the populations who live between Saudi Arabia, Egypt and North Central Italy more than the local Iberians, occurred relatively early in the Sephardic population because if it appeared instead at the end of the community's isolation in Iberia, there would be insufficient time for its spread in the population. The frequency of T2e matches in Spain and Portugal is drastically lower than in those listed above Jews. Similarly, fewer Sephardic signature T2e5 matches were found in Iberia than in Northern Mexico and Southwest United States.

Behar et al. proposed that the existence of the mtDNA haplogroup HV0 among Jews from Turkey might represent the "genetic signal of an admixture of Iberian Jewry with local Iberian populations".

Mt-DNA of the Jews of Turkey does not include to a large extent mt-DNA lineages typical of West Asia.

=== MtDNA of Mizrahi Jews ===
According to the 2008 study by Behar, 43% of Iraqi Jews are descended from five women. Genetic studies show that Persian and Bukharan Jews descend from a small number of female ancestors. The Mountain Jews showed a striking maternal founding event, with 58.6% of their total mtDNA genetic variation tracing back to one woman from the Levant carrying an mtDNA lineage within Hg J2b.

According to the study of M. Thomas et al., 51% of Georgian Jews are descended from a single female. According to Behar, 58% are descended from this female ancestor. Researchers have not determined the origin of this ancestor, but it is known that this woman carried a haplotype that can be found throughout a large area stretching from the Mediterranean to Iraq and to the Caucasus.

In a study by Richards et al., the authors suggest that a minor proportion of haplogroup L1 and L3a lineages from sub-Saharan Africa is present among Yemenite Jews. These lines occur 4 times less frequently than among non-Jewish Yemenis. These sub-Saharan haplogroups are virtually absent among Jews from Iraq, Iran, and Georgia and do not appear among Ashkenazi Jews. The Jewish population of Yemen also reveals a founder effect: 42% of the direct maternal lines are traceable to five women, four coming from western Asia and one from East Africa.

=== MtDNA of Ethiopian Jews ===
For Beta Israel, the results are similar to those of the male population, namely, genetic characteristics identical to those of surrounding populations.

=== MtDNA of Indian Jews ===
According to the study of 2008 by Behar et al., the maternal lineage of the Bene Israel and Cochin Jews of India is of predominantly indigenous Indian origin. However, the mtDNA of the Bene Israel also includes lineages commonly found among Iranian and Iraqi Jews and also present among Italian Jews, and the MtDNA of Cochin Jews has some similarities to mtDNA lineages present in several non-Ashkenazi Jewish communities. Genetic research shows that 41.3% of Bene Israel descend from one female ancestor, who was of indigenous Indian origin. Another study also found that Cochin Jews have genetic similarities with other Jewish populations, in particular with Yemenite Jews, along with the indigenous populations of India.

== Comparison to non-Jewish populations ==
=== Levantines ===
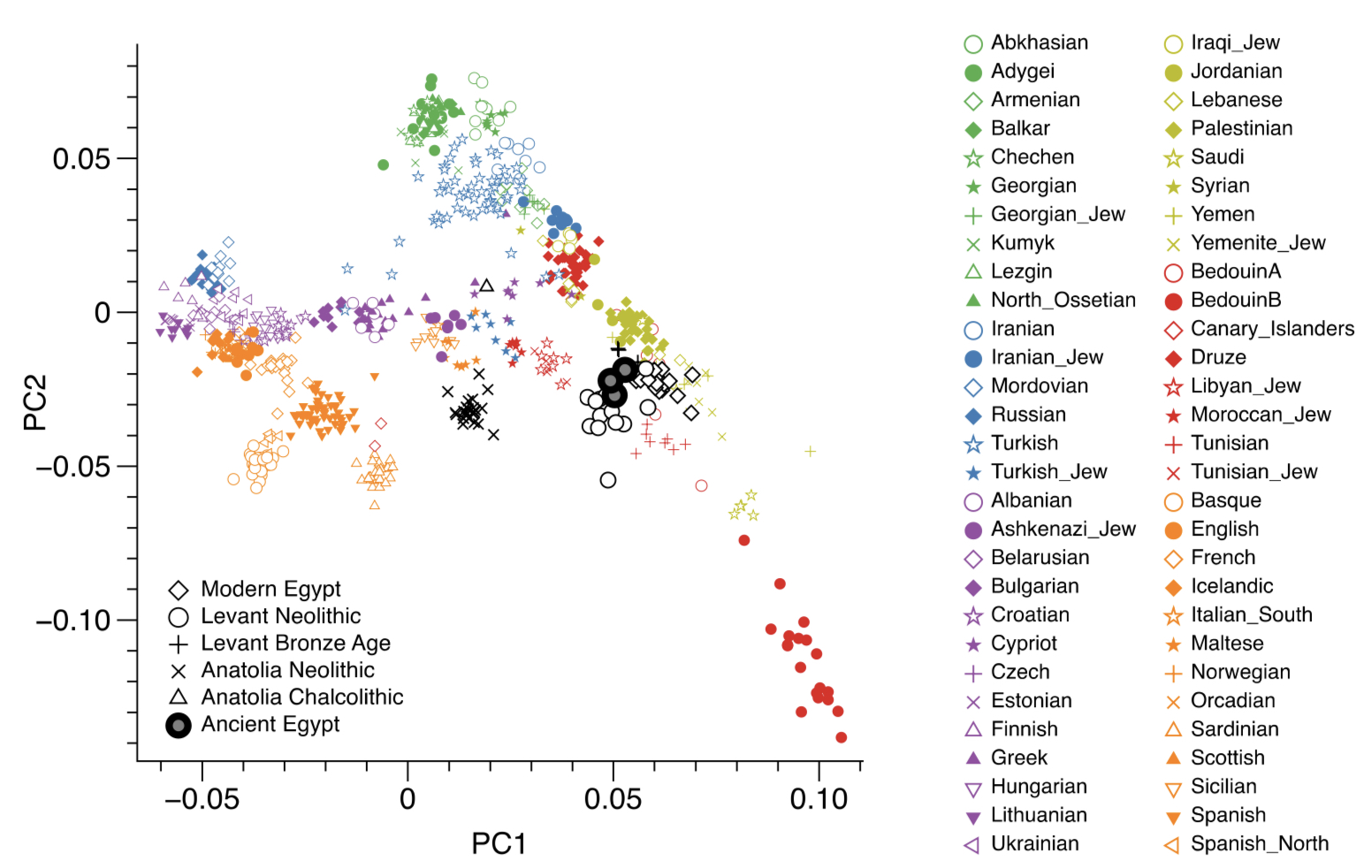
Genome-wide principal component analysis of world populations showing various Jewish and non-Jewish groups

Many genetic studies have demonstrated that most of the various Jewish ethnic divisions, Palestinians, Bedouin, and other Levantines cluster near one another. They found substantial genetic overlap between Israeli and Palestinian Arabs and Ashkenazi and Sephardic Jews. A small but statistically significant difference was found in the Y-chromosomal haplogroup distributions of Sephardic Jews and Palestinians, but no significant differences were found between Ashkenazi Jews and Palestinians nor between the two Jewish communities. A distinct cluster was found in Palestinian haplotypes. Out of the 143 Arab Y-chromosomes studied, 32% of them belonged to this "I&P Arab clade", which contained only one non-Arab chromosome, that of a Sephardic Jew. This could be due to geographical isolation of the Jews or admixture from other populations but also could be seen as insignificant considering how small the group being tested was, with over 68% of them showing no significant genetic differences at all.

==== Samaritans ====
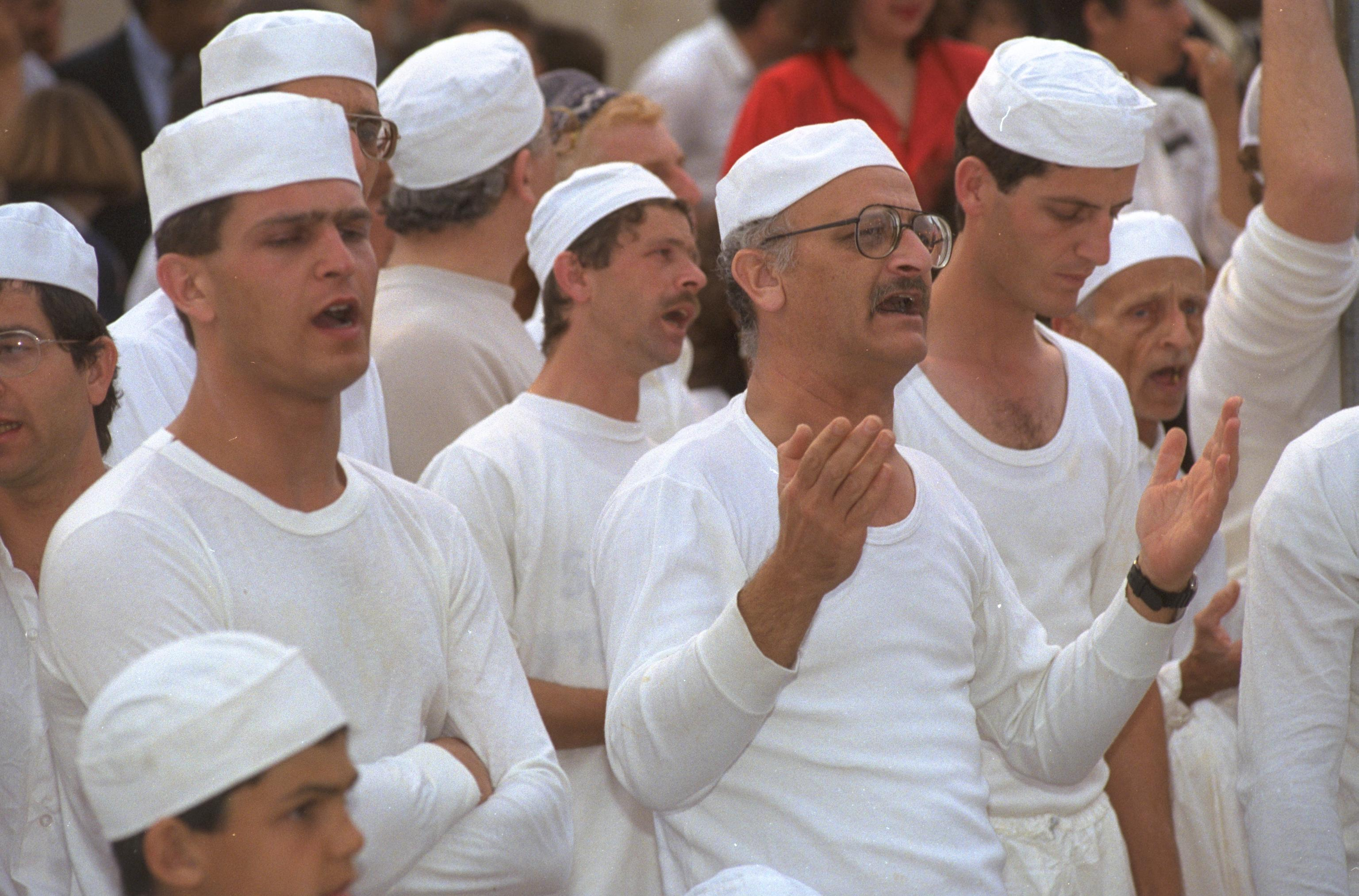
Samaritans celebrating Passover on Mount Gerizim

The Samaritans is a population of the northern part of ancient Israel, where they are historically well-identified since at least the 4th century BC. They define themselves as the descendants of tribes of Ephraim and Manasseh (named after the two sons of Joseph) living in the Kingdom of Israel before its destruction in 722 BC, as distinct from the Jews, descendants of the Israelites from the southern Kingdom of Judah.

A 2004 study by Shen et al. compared the Y-DNA and DNA-mt of 12 Samaritan men with those of 158 men who were not Samaritans, divided between 6 Jewish populations (Ashkenazi, Moroccan, Libyan, Ethiopian, Iraqi, and Yemeni) and 2 non-Jewish populations from Israel (Druze and Arab). The study concludes that significant similarities exist between the paternal lines of Jews and Samaritans, but the maternal lines differ between the two populations. The pair-wise genetic distances (Fst) between 11 populations from AMOVA were applied to the Y-chromosomal and mitochondrial data. For the Y-chromosome, all Jewish groups (except for the Ethiopian Jews) are closely related to each other and do not differ significantly from the Samaritans (0.041) or Druze (0.033), but are different from Palestinian Arabs (0.163), Africans (0.219), and Europeans (0.111). This study indicated that the Samaritan and Jewish Y-chromosomes have a much greater affinity for the other than for their geographical neighbors, the Palestinian Arabs. This suggests the two share a common ancestral Near Eastern population preceding their divergence in the 4th century BCE, supporting the Samaritan narrative of descent from native Israelites who survived the Assyrian exile rather than from foreign populations introduced by the Assyrian Empire.

=== Lembas ===
The Lemba of South Africa, a Bantu speaking people whose culture forbids the consumption of pork and requires male circumcision, has a high frequency of the Middle Eastern Y-chromosome HgJ-12f2a (25%), a potentially SEA Y, Hg-K(xPQR) (32%) and a Bantu Y, E-PN1 (30%) (similar to E-M2). There are indications of genetic connections with the Hadramaut, i.e., the Lemba Y-chromosomes and Hadramaut Y-chromosomes showed overlap. It has been suggested by Tudor Parfitt and Yulia Egorova that their Jewish ancestors probably came along with general Semitic incursions into East Africa from South Arabia, and then moved slowly south through the area of Great Zimbabwe.

Recent research published in the South African Medical Journal studied Y-Chromosome variations in two groups of Lemba, one South African and the other Zimbabwean (the Remba). It concluded that "While it was not possible to trace unequivocally the origins of the non-African Y chromosomes in the Lemba and Remba, this study does not support the earlier claims of their Jewish genetic heritage." The researcher suggested "a stronger link with Middle Eastern populations, probably the result of trade activity in the Indian Ocean."

=== Inhabitants of Spain, Portugal, and Ibero-America ===
According to a 2008 study by Adams and colleagues the inhabitants of the Iberian Peninsula (Spain and Portugal) have an average of 20% Sephardi Jewish ancestry, (Note: The term Sephardi is used here in its strict sense to mean the Jews settled in the Iberian peninsula before the expulsions in and after 1492.) with significant geographical variations ranging from 0% on Menorca to 36.3% in southern Portugal. According to the authors, part of this admixture might also be of Neolithic, Phoenician, or Arab-Syrian origin.

Modern-day Ibero-American populations have also shown varying degrees of Sephardic Jewish ancestry: New Christian converso Iberian settler ancestors of Sephardic Jewish origin. Ibero-Americans are largely the result of admixture between immigrants from Iberia, indigenous peoples of the Americas, and sub-Saharan African slaves, as well as other Europeans and other immigrants. An individual's specific mixture depends on their family genealogy; a significant proportion of immigrants from Iberia (Spain and Portugal) hid their Sephardic Jewish origin.

Researchers analyzed "two well-established communities in Colorado (33 unrelated individuals) and Ecuador (20 unrelated individuals) with a measurable prevalence of the BRCA1 c.185delAG and the GHR c.E180 mutations, respectively [...] thought to have been brought to these communities by Sephardic Jewish progenitors. [...] When examining the presumed European component of these two communities, we demonstrate enrichment for Sephardic Jewish ancestry not only for these mutations but also for other segments as well. [...] These findings are consistent with historical accounts of Jewish migration from the realms that comprise modern Spain and Portugal during the Age of Discovery. More importantly, they provide a rationale for the occurrence of mutations typically associated with the Jewish diaspora in Latin American communities."

== Studies on historical populations ==
A 2020 study on remains from Bronze Age southern Levantine (Canaanite) populations found evidence of large-scale migration from the Zagros or Caucasus into the southern Levant by the Bronze Age and increasing over time (resulting in a Canaanite population descended from both those migrants and earlier Neolithic Levantine peoples). The results were found to be consistent with several Jewish groups (Moroccan, Ashkenazi, and Persian/Iranian Jews) and non-Jewish Arabic-speaking Levantine populations (such as Lebanese, Druze, Palestinians, and Syrians) deriving about half or more of their ancestry from populations related to those from the Bronze Age Levant and Chalcolithic Zagros. The study modeled the aforementioned groups as having ancestry from both ancient populations.

In a study published in December 2022, new genome data obtained from the medieval Jewish cemetery of Erfurt, Germany was used to further trace the origins of the Ashkenazi Jewish community. These findings suggest that medieval Erfurt had at least two related but genetically distinct Jewish groups: one was closely related to Middle Eastern populations and was especially similar to modern Ashkenazi Jews from France and Germany and modern Sephardic Jews from Turkey; the other group had a substantial contribution from Eastern European populations. Modern Ashkenazi Jews from Eastern Europe no longer exhibit this genetic variability, and instead, their genomes resemble a nearly even mixture of the two Erfurt groups (with about 60% from the first group and 40% from the second).

A study of Norwich Jews published in Current Biology in October 2022 analyzed a mass grave dated to between 1161 and 1216, correlating their death to an 1190 Third Crusade-era pogrom, and found DNA evidence of strong genetic affinity to present-day Ashkenazi Jews, including the reconstruction of similar genetic diseases, red hair, and blue eyes.

A study of Catalonian Jews published in Genes in March 2026 analyzed victims of the 1348 pogrom against Jews in Tàrrega, Spain, whose bodies were deposited in a mass grave in the town's Roquetes necropolis, and found numerous markers of Jewish ancestry. The studied individuals clustered tightly with modern Jewish groups and were genetically distinct from the surrounding non-Jewish medieval population. Their genetic model found an intermediate between Iberian and Mediterranean/Near Eastern ancestry.

== Hypotheses ==
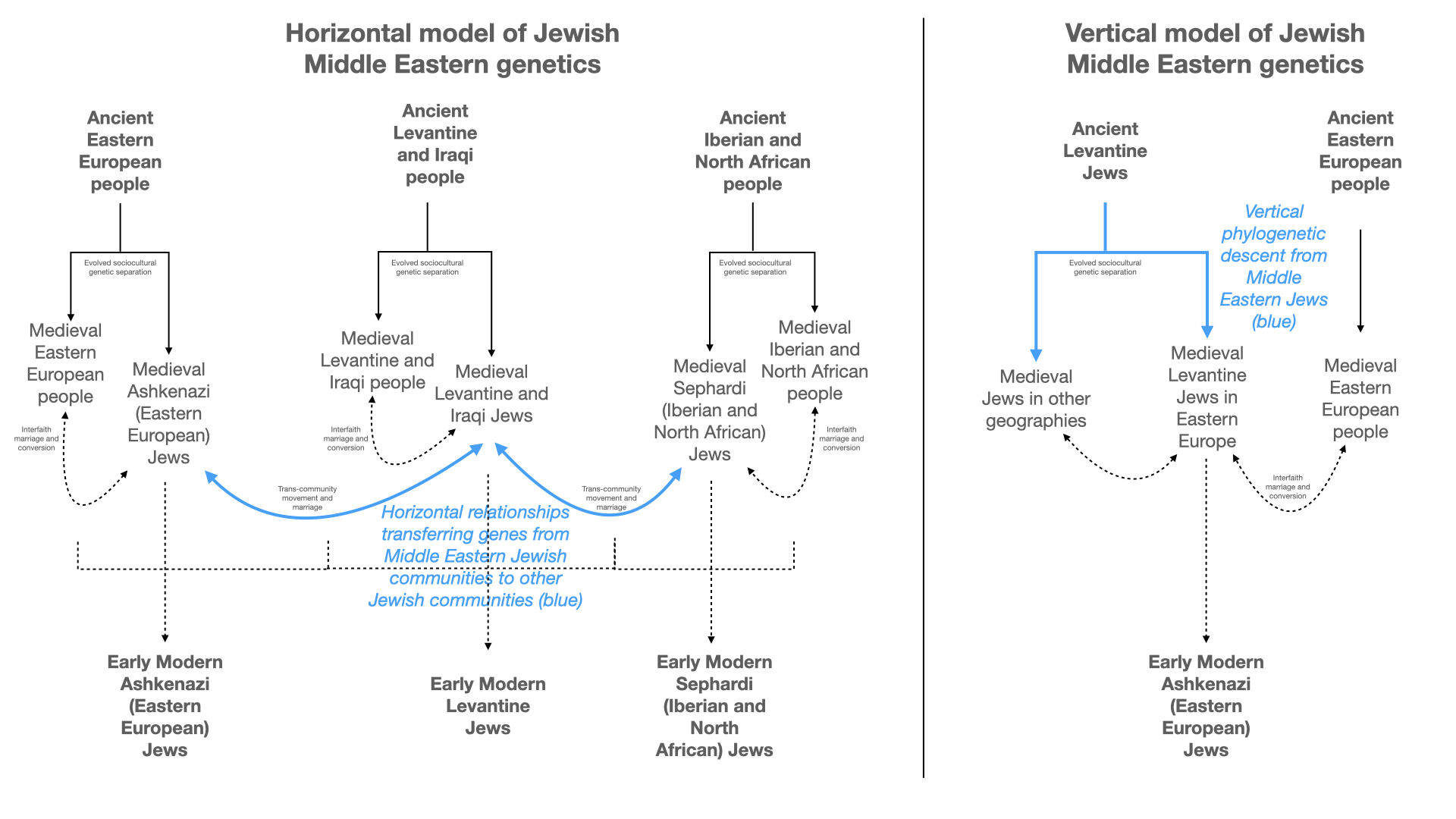
Horizontal and Vertical models of Jewish Middle Eastern genetics, per Raphael Falk

A 2009 study was able to genetically identify individuals with full or partial Ashkenazi Jewish ancestry. In August 2012, Legacy: A Genetic History of the Jewish People, a book by Harry Ostrer, concluded that all major Jewish groups share a common Middle Eastern origin. Ostrer also refuted the Khazar hypothesis of Ashkenazi ancestry. Autosomal genetic analysis in 2012 revealed that North African Jews are genetically close to European Jews, which "shows that North African Jews date to biblical-era Israel, and are not largely the descendants of natives who converted to Judaism."

Y DNA studies examine various paternal lineages of modern Jewish populations. Such studies strongly suggest a small number of founders in an old population whose members parted and followed different migration paths. In most Jewish populations, these male line ancestors appear to have been mainly Middle Eastern. For example, Ashkenazi Jews share more common paternal lineages with other Jewish and Middle Eastern groups than with non-Jewish populations in areas where Jews lived in Eastern Europe, Germany, and the Rhine Valley. This is consistent with Jewish traditions in placing most Jewish paternal origins in the region of the Middle East.

A study conducted in 2013 by Behar et al. found no evidence of a Khazar origin for Ashkenazi Jews and stated that this lack of evidence "corroborates earlier results that Ashkenazi Jews derive their ancestry primarily from populations of the Middle East and Europe, that they possess considerable shared ancestry with other Jewish populations, and that there is no indication of a significant genetic contribution either from within or from north of the Caucasus region."

In 2016, Eran Elhaik, together with Ranajit Das, Paul Wexler and Mehdi Pirooznia, advanced the view that the first Ashkenazi populations to speak Yiddish came from areas near four villages in Eastern Anatolia along the Silk Road whose names derived from the word "Ashkenaz", arguing that Iranian, Greek, Turkish, and Slav populations converted on that travel route before moving to Khazaria, where a small-scale conversion took place. The study was widely dismissed by genomics researchers as well as linguists. In a joint study published in 2016 by Genome Biology and Evolution, Pavel Flegontov from Department of Biology and Ecology, Faculty of Science, University of Ostrava, Czech Republic, A. A. Kharkevich Institute of Linguistics, Russian Academy of Sciences, Moscow, Mark G. Thomas from Research Department of Genetics, Evolution and Environment, University College London, UK, Valentina Fedchenko from Saint Petersburg State University, and George Starostin from Russian State University for the Humanities, dismissed both the genetic and linguistic components of Elhaik et al. study arguing that "GPS is a provenancing tool suited to inferring the geographic region where a modern and recently unadmixed genome is most likely to arise, but is hardly suitable for admixed populations and for tracing ancestry up to 1000 years before present, as its authors have previously claimed. Moreover, all methods of historical linguistics concur that Yiddish is a Germanic language, with no reliable evidence for Slavic, Iranian, or Turkic substrata." The authors concluded:

"In our view, Das and co-authors have attempted to fit together a marginal and unsupported interpretation of the linguistic data with a genetic provenancing approach, GPS, that is at best only suited to inferring the most likely geographic location of modern and relatively unadmixed genomes, and tells nothing of population history and origin."

Elhaik's and Das' work was strongly criticized by Marion Aptroot from University of Düsseldorf, among others, who in a study published by Genome Biology and Evolution claimed that "Das et al. create a narrative based on genetic, philological and historical research and state that the findings of the three disciplines support each other...Incomplete and unreliable data from times when people were not counted regardless of sex, age, religion, or financial or social status on the one hand, and the dearth of linguistic evidence predating the 15th century on the other, leave much room for conjecture and speculation. Linguistic evidence, however, does not support the theory that Yiddish is a Slavic language, and textual sources belie the thesis that the name Ashkenaz was brought to Eastern Europe directly from a region in the Near East... certain aspects of the article by Das et al. fall short of established standards".

=== Ancient Israelite DNA ===
As of 2025, the sole study on ancient Israelite DNA pertains to genetic material recovered from the remains of ancient Israelites who lived during the First Temple period. These remains were excavated from the Kiryat Ye'arim site. Professor Israel Finkelstein led the research, during which two individuals - one male and one female - were examined. The study revealed that the male individual belonged to the J2 Y-DNA haplogroup, a set of closely related DNA sequences thought to have originated in the Caucasus or Eastern Anatolia, while the two different mitochondrial DNA identified were T1a9 and H87. The former had previously been documented in an Iron Age Polish site. The latter has been observed in modern Basques, Tunisian Arabs, and Iraqis.

== History ==
As early as the 1950s, failed attempts were made to use markers such as fingerprint patterns to characterize Jewish communities. In the 1960s, more success was made in tracking the distribution of genetic diseases in Jewish communities. Alongside this, studies were being conducted that focused on identifying trends in converging blood group frequencies. Also at this time, studies began being conducted based on blood groups and serum markers, research that yielded both evidence of Middle East origins among Jewish diaspora groups and a degree of commonality between Jewish populations relative to paired Jewish and non-Jewish populations.

From the mid-1970s onwards, RNA and DNA sequencing enabled the comparison of genetic relationships, and during the 1980s, it also became possible to examine genetic polymorphism across multiple sites in DNA sequences. During this period, researchers worked to categorize the relatedness between different Jewish groups. Due to a paucity of polymorphic markers, the early studies "focused on genetic distances" and building hierarchical models between population samples. Advances in DNA sequence analysis using algorithms based on "probable common forefathers on the assumption of branching phylogenies" pointed to common progenitors among diverse Jewish communities, as well as overlap with Mediterranean populations. Both the early studies on blood markers and later studies of the monoallelic Y chromosomal and mitochondrial DNA (mtDNA) haplotypes revealed evidence of both Middle Eastern and local origin. The conclusions of the diverse studies conducted turned out to be "remarkably similar", providing both evidence of shared genetic ancestry among major diaspora groups and varied levels of local genetic admixture.

In the 1990s, this developed into attempts to identify markers in highly discrete population groups. The results were mixed. However, such studies did show that certain population groups could be identified. As David Goldstein noted: "Our studies of the Cohanim established that present-day Ashkenazi and Sephardi Cohanim are more genetically similar to one another than they are to either Israelites or non-Jews."

Ashkenazi ancestry research findings vary, depending on whether maternal (mitochondrial) DNA, paternal Y chromosomes, or more modern genome-wide analysis is used to trace lineage. In his 2013 study, Richards analyzed mitochondrial DNA only, finding that that 40% of Ashkenazi mitochondrial DNA was traced to four shared, entirely European origins; in total, over 80% of Ashkenazi maternal lineage was traced to Europe, with most of the remainder originating in the Near East. These findings debunk the Khazar origin story, that Jews originated from the North Caucasus, between the Black and Caspian Seas (in an area between the Byzantine and Persian Empires) during the 9th century, according to both Richards and Ostrer. Studies based on paternal haplogroups estimate that between 50% and 80% of Ashkenazic Y-chromosomal lineages originate in the Near East. Richards' genetic interpretation of the combined results is that many founding Ashkenazi women were European converts to Judaism who married Jewish men from the Near East. Most researchers now believe that Ashkenazi Jews are descended from both the ancient Israelites and from European converts to Judaism.

== See also ==
- Expulsions and exoduses of Jews
- Genetic history of the Middle East
- Groups claiming affiliation with Israelites
- Historical Jewish population comparisons
- Jewish genealogy
- Jewish history
- Jewish identity
- Jews with Haplogroup G
- Medical genetics of Jews
