= Paul Wexler =

Paul Wexler may refer to:

- Paul Wexler (actor) (1929–1979), American character actor
- Paul Wexler (linguist) (born 1938), American-born Israeli linguist
