= Isaac Mozeson =

American-Israeli pseudolinguist (1951-)

Isaac Elchanan Mozeson
- Born: 1951 (age 74–75); British Columbia, Canada
- Education: Ph.D.
- Alma mater: New York University
- Known for: Research and writings about the origin of languages
- Father: Rabbi Leon M. Mozeson

Isaac Elchanan Mozeson (born 1951) is best known for his creationist and pseudolinguistic writings which attempt to ground the origin of all human languages in ancient Hebrew, as the language of the Garden of Eden.

== Early life ==
In a 1990 interview he traced his area of interest to a "lasting impression" by having "heard his grade school Rebbe recount the Torah story of the Tower of Bavel" and talking of "a common language."

Mozeson was born 1951 in British Columbia to "Rabbi and Mrs. Leon M. Mozeson of Portland, Me." The family moved to Brookline, Massachusetts, where he attended the Maimonides School and graduated 1969.

Mozeson's subsequent formal education is from Yeshiva University, where he later taught; CUNY;, NYU; "and at the Erna Michael College of Hebraic Studies."

== The Word: The Dictionary that Reveals the Hebrew Source of English ==
Mozeson's ten years of work on The Word: The Dictionary that Reveals the Hebrew Source of English began "while working on his doctorate at NYU." The Dictionary's foundation had early challengers, including his PhD advisor, who called some of his examples "a coincidence." an English professor in New York, died prior to the publication of the work but was reported to have said "The Word is a challenge to linguistics" and added "The parallels traced seem beyond the range of coincidence." The linguist David L. Gold, however, was extremely critical of Mozeson's work, writing, "Possibly every error imaginable in the study of language was committed in this dictionary, which should be read, if at all, as an antitextbook of linguistics, to be studied not for emulation but for avoidance."

== The Origin Of Speeches: Intelligent Design in Language ==
Mozeson's The Origin Of Speeches: Intelligent Design in Language has a Tower of Babel drawing with a subheading that refers to "The Language of Eden." The book asks why "belief that blind chance endowed human beings with the sense and physiology to devise a highly complex system of expression" is widely given more acceptance than belief in the Bible's account of the Tower of Babel.

== Edenics controversy ==
Edenics is Mozeson's description regarding speech in the Garden of Eden as the original human language and that "human language did not evolve by accident." A Jewish Press book review of Mozeson's The Origin Of Speeches: Intelligent Design in Language used the word Edenic more than once but did not use his term Edenics; neither did a satire published in The Algemeiner Journal about the naming of the book "Origin of the Speeches" as similar to Charles Darwin's The Origin of Species. The latter even rejects the term in the singular, writing that "Isaac Mozeson, a Ph.D. in linguistics from NYU ... hypothesizes a primal, universal language that he calls Edenic (and others might call proto-Semitic or ancient Hebrew)." It also refers to PIE after citing Mozeson's "Proto-Indo-European" and states about "Dr. Mozeson and a team of researchers" that "they have no idea if the language ever existed." The satire supports the concept of a single universal tongue, and uses examples from modern Hebrew. (Note: e.g., "In Edenic (and Modern Hebrew) the word for ...")

== Other works ==
He co-authored Wars of the Jews: A Military History from Biblical to Modern Times with Monroe Rosenthal. Mozeson is also a senior editor for The Jewish Heritage Writing Project.

In 1994, Mozeson and Lois Stavsky co-authored Jerusalem Mosaic: Young Voices from the Holy City. A 2001 curriculum guide describes it as "Gr. 8-12. Jewish and Arab teens talk about their lives in Jerusalem and their hopes for the future." The 1909-founded American Academy of Religion lists the book in its "Guidelines for Teaching About Religion in K-12 Public Schools in the United States" as "Recommended for grades 6-12" and writes "Jewish, Christian, and Muslim perspectives from varying positions on the secular-orthodox spectrum."

Mozeson's other works include:

- Beginner's Hebrew Word Book: An Illustrated Dictionary
- A 2 Z: The Book of Rap and Hip-hop Slang (co-authored)
- Voices and Faces of Homeless Teens (co-authored)
- The Hidden Hebrew in the Philippines (co-authored) Neil Lim Capapas and Isaac E. Mozeson
- https://edenics.fyi/products/the-hidden-hebrew-in-the-phillipines?
