= Paul Wexler (linguist) =

American-Israeli linguist

Professor Paul Wexler
- פאול וקסלר
- Born: November 6, 1938 (age 87); United States

Academic background
- Education: Columbia University

Paul Wexler (born November 6, 1938, Hebrew: פאול וקסלר, pronounced [ˈpaul ˈveksler]) is an American-born Israeli linguist, and Professor Emeritus of linguistics at Tel Aviv University. His research fields include historical linguistics, bilingualism, Slavic linguistics, creole linguistics, Romani and Jewish languages.

Wexler is known in Yiddish linguistics mainly for his hypothesis that Eastern Yiddish is ultimately derived from Judaeo-Slavic, a hypothesis that has been widely rejected by other Yiddish and Germanic linguists and geneticists.

Wexler has argued that the Yiddish language structure provides evidence that Jews had "intimate contact" with early Slavs in the German and Bohemian lands as early as the 9th century.

== Biography ==
Wexler was born to parents of Ukrainian Jewish background and raised in the United States, earned his B.A. at Yale University in 1960, his M.A. in 1962 at Columbia University, where he studied under Uriel Weinreich and George Shevelov, and his Ph.D. at the same university in 1967. In the same year, while resident at the University of Washington, he wrote a pedagogical grammar of the Aymara language for Peace Corps volunteers. He moved to Israel in 1969. He did his basic training in the IDF in 1974.

== Hypotheses on the origins of Jewish languages ==
Traditionally, Yiddish was regarded as a broken mangled form of German. With the rise of historical linguistics, a gradual consensus was formed that accorded it equal status with German, with both seen as parallel descendants of an early Germanic language. In the aftermath of WW2, this was challenged by Max Weinreich who proposed that it arose as Romance-speaking Jews Germanized their mother tongue as they migrated further north and east, in the wake of Crusader massacres. Throughout the 1970s and 1980s, Wexler also subscribed to the traditional view of Yiddish as a very Slavicized dialect of Middle High German, dating back to its formation around the 9–10th century, when Romance-speaking Jews settled in the Rhineland and Bavaria. By the early 1990s he became sceptical of this mainstream theory. In the 1980s, Alice Faber and Robert King proposed a Knaanic origin, in West Slavic dialects as spoken notably in the Czech lands, and also in the areas of Poland, Lusatia, and other Sorbian regions.

In 1990, Wexler published a book titled The Schizoid Nature of Modern Hebrew: A Slavic Language in Search of a Semitic Past in which he argued that Modern Hebrew is not a direct continuation of the Hebrew language, but rather a Slavic language. He noted that several scholars of distinction had expressed a minority view casting doubt on the Semitic, as opposed to the European, character of modern Hebrew, among them specialists in Semitic languages, like Gotthelf Bergsträsser and Henri Fleisch. Wexler also noted that one writer, K. Kacnelson, even suggested in 1960 that modern Hebrew was a dialect of Yiddish. He argued that the modern language spoken by Israelis was simply Yiddish relexified to Biblical Hebrew and Mishnaic Hebrew. Wexler advanced the view that Yiddish itself arose from Sorbian, and, given the strong influence of the former on Modern Hebrew, in this perspective Modern Hebrew can be considered a Slavic language.

There are 3 distinct theories regarding the origin of Yiddish, and Wexler's approach differs radically with the two main theories positing a Western Rhineland origin or a Bavarian/Czech genesis, and does so by breaking the genetic link between the Slavic countries and those Jews who lived in medieval Germany. Wexler argues that Yiddish began as two distinct languages: Judeo-French (Western Yiddish) and a Judeo-Sorbian dialect spoken in eastern Germany. The former died out while the latter formed the basis for the later Yiddish language. Eastern Yiddish, he hypothesizes, is derived from an interlanguage in which Sorbian played a germinal role. He hypothesizes this second relexification of Eastern Yiddish took place in the 15th century, at which time the descendants of the Khazars no longer spoke a Turkic language but rather a mixed Slavo-Turkic.

Wexler's hypotheses are based on analyses of numerous Jewish languages and introduce creolization as a factor in the formation of many of them. Other than linguistic analysis, he separates Jewish cultural areas into Judeo-Greek, Judeo-Romance, Judeo-Germanic, (Note: The term is ambiguous. Jürg Fleischer writes: "It is necessary to state that there is no terminological consensus in the academic literature. Different scholars may understand different linguistic entities when using the terms West(ern) Yiddish (or its equivalents, such as Yiddish mayrev-yidish, mayrevdik yidish, German Westjiddisch, etc.) or Judeo-German (or its equivalents, such as Judaeo-German, Jewish German, Yiddish yiddish-daytsh, German Jüdisch-Deutsch, Judendeutsch, etc. In the terminological approach taken here, 'Western Yiddish' is used to designate a Jewish variety that differs from coterritorial German, in terms not only of vocabulary but of linguistic structure. In contrast, a variety spoken by Jews containing special vocabulary, but not otherwise differing from (local) German is designated 'Judeo-German'." (Fleischer 2018, p. 239)) Judeo-Turkic, Judeo-Tat, Judaeo-Georgian, Judeo-Arabic and Judeo-Slavic. While he acknowledges that many Jewish languages have a Hebrew substratum, Wexler's hypothesis holds that these languages were derived from various proselyte groups who retained the grammar of their old non-Jewish languages, while relexifying them through the extensive adoption of new vocabularies. This approach reflects Wexler's interpretation of Jewish ethnogenesis, according to which Jews are not a Semitic "people" so much as a "religious community" of diverse ethnic backgrounds, among which "Semitic" Arabs and Aramaeans form only a very minute component.

Wexler considers it possible that the Slavicized descendants of the Khazars immigrated north and westward, causing some Eastern Slavic terms for Jewish holidays to becoming part of Western Slavic. Wexler states that his hypothesis does not require Yiddish to contain a significant Turkic substratum. Wexler rejects the theory that the differences between Eastern and Western Yiddish were caused by the former's greater exposure to Slavic, instead viewing the two dialects as two largely separate languages.

In his 1993 book he stated that Ashkenazi Jews could be considered ethnically Slavic. He asserts that the Ashkenazi are not of Mediterranean origin. Considering the logical outcome of his linguistic hypotheses to be that Ashkenazi Jews are the descendants of Iranian, Turkic, and Slavic proselytes. He has also applied his linguistic hypotheses to Sephardic Jews suggesting similarly that they are in fact also of non-Jewish origin, originating from Berber proselytes rather than from Spain.

Herbert Paper in his 1995 paper on two of Wexler books rejects two of Wexler's hypotheses: first, that Yiddish is derived from an undiscovered Judeo-Sorbian language and secondly that Modern Hebrew is in fact a Slavic language. He prefers to describe languages Max Weinreich described as Eastern and Western Knaanic as, rather, Judeo-Slavic. In more recent work, Wexler has proposed three origins of Yiddish, by dividing it into two distinct languages: he regards Western Yiddish as a Judaized German; Eastern Yiddish is interpreted as developing from Judeo-Slavic relexified to High German and then again to Yiddish. He has also argued however that that eastern Yiddish is a relexification of Judeo-Turkic and linked to the Khazars and Karaites.

Katz has argued that Wexler's methodology is inconsistent with the accepted methods of historical linguistics. Since the conventional comparative method, used throughout the field of historical linguistics, suggests that Yiddish is descended from Old High German, and furthermore that the dialects of both Western and Eastern Yiddish can be reliably traced back to a Proto-Yiddish phonology, Wexler's arguments about the origin of Eastern Yiddish are considered by some critics to be "in the realm of unsupported speculation" and marginal within the field of linguistics.

Paul Wexler has revised or refined his earlier views on both Yiddish and the Turkic-Iranian-Khazar origins given in several papers between 2000 and 2009. In 2021 he proposed that there is a significant Afro-Eurasian component in Yiddish and adduced 20,000 forms from roughly 270 such languages in support of his thesis, relating them to over 5,000 pieces of Yiddish evidence, concluding that:-

the Khazar Empire and its Turkic minority population probably did not play a major role in the ethno-linguistic genesis of Yiddish and the Ashkenazic Jews ... the Khazar Empire did emerge as a central venue for the creation of several Jewish languages (including Yiddish and its forebears) and for the conversion of many non-Turkic non-Jews to Judaism who desired access to the lucrative Silk Road trade that was dominated widely by the Jewish merchants.

Wexler's approach has often been harshly criticized by many other specialists in the field, the majority of whom reject them. Alexander Beider states: "Sometimes I even wonder if he himself believes in what he writes. If he does not believe, but merely wants to provoke, his writings of the last 20 years are oriented just to prove that Jews are not Jews. In this case, there is nothing to discuss."

== Linguistics and genetics ==
In 2016, Wexler and geneticist Eran Elhaik co-authored a study that analyzed the geographical origin of Yiddish speakers using a method called Geographic Population Structure (GPS) to analyze their DNA. They claimed that the DNA has originated in Northeastern Turkey in four villages whose names were, they argued, derived from the word "Ashkenaz." The predicted location was also on the hub of Silk Road routes and close to the Khazarian Empire, as predicted by Wexler and in contrast with the predictions of the Rhineland hypothesis. The authors argue that this is where a non-Germanic "pre-Yiddish" was developed as an undocumented language for trade and that with the Judaization of Slavs it acquired its alleged Slavic component. A group paper by geneticists headed by Pavel Flegontov, together with the linguist George Starostin criticized this paper, arguing that it had serious methodological flaws in the evaluation of the linguistic and genetic components. Appealing to the consensual view that Yiddish is descended from Old High German, they also argue that the Geographic Population Structure (GPS) tool is not suitable "for admixed populations and for tracing ancestry up to 1,000 years before present, as its authors have previously claimed." In reply, Elhaik, Wexler et al., dismissed the Flegontov paper as marred by lack of knowledge of Jewish history and a failure to evaluate relexification.

In 2021 Wexler published a new work, his Silk Road Linguistics: The Birth of Yiddish and the Multiethnic Jewish Peoples on the Silk Road. In this monograph, running to well over 1,400 pages, Wexler discusses the origins and relations of almost 300 lexemes he considers part of the "Afro-Eurasian elements in Yiddish".

== Criticism ==
Dovid Katz considers his approach inconsistent with conventional methods of historical linguistics and the comparative method, arguing that such methods demonstrate that both Eastern and Western Yiddish are descended from a Middle High German dialect with components of Aramaic and Hebrew vocabulary, and underwent the same regular sound changes as those undergone by the German components.

Wexler was also a co-author on a controversial population genetics paper with Eran Elhaik that claimed that Ashkenazi Jews have genetic origins in Turkey. The inclusion of Wexler's linguistic theories to support the theory proposed by the article was criticized by linguists and geneticists.

== Controversy ==
In 1988, Wexler was suspected of having written, under the Ukrainian pseudonym Pavlo Slobodjans'kyj, a harshly-worded review in the journal Language of a volume entitled Origins of the Yiddish Language. While criticising others, the writer excluded Wexler's work, contained in the same volume, from criticism. Dovid Katz, whose claim that Aramaic-speaking Jews immigrated to Germany prior to 10th century was dismissed as "incredible", raised strong protests over the putative use of a pseudonym, with evidence suggesting that the review had all the hallmarks of Wexler's polemical style and that the submission had been sent from the address of one of Wexler's relatives. The journal where it was published, Language, later published an apology and retracted the review.

== Bibliography ==
- Wexler, Paul (1967a). Purism and language. A study in modern Belorussian and Ukrainian nationalism (1840-1967). Bloomington: Indiana University. ISBN 978-0-877-50175-6.
- —, ed. (1967b). Beginning Aymara: A Course for English Speakers (PDF). Seattle WA: Peace Corps Training Programs, University of Washington.
- — (1977). A historical phonology of the Belorussian language. Heidelberg: Carl Winter Universitätsverlag. ISBN 978-3-533-02575-7.
- — (1987). Explorations in Judeo-Slavic Linguistics. Brill. ISBN 978-9-004-07656-3.
- — (1988). Three heirs to a Judeo-Latin legacy: Judeo-Ibero-Romance, Yiddish and Rotwelsch. Wiesbaden: Harrassowitz Verlag. ISBN 978-344702813-4.
- — (1989). Judeo-Romance linguistics. A bibliography (Latin, Italo-, Gallo-, Ibero- and Rhaeto- Romance, (except Castilian). New York; London: Garland. ISBN 978-082404531-9.
- — (1990a). The Schizoid Nature of Modern Hebrew: A Slavic Language in Search of a Semitic Past. Otto Harrassowitz Verlag. ISBN 978-3-447-03063-2.
- — (1990b). Studies in Yiddish linguistics. Tübingen: Max Niemeyer. ISBN 978-348460345-5.
- — (1991). "Yiddish — the fifteenth Slavic language". International Journal of the Sociology of Language (91).
- — (1992). "From Serb Lands to Sorb Lands". The Balkan Substratum of Yiddish: A Reassessment of the Unique Romance and Greek Components. Mediterranean Language and Culture Monograph Series. Vol. 9. Wiesbaden: Harrassowitz Verlag. ISBN 978-344703336-7.
- — (1993). The Ashkenazic Jews: A Slavo-Turkic People in Search of a Jewish Identity. University of Michigan. ISBN 978-089357241-9.
- — (1996). The non-Jewish origins of the Sephardic Jews. SUNY. ISBN 978-1-4384-2393-7.
- — (2002a). Two-Tiered Relexification in Yiddish: Jews, Sorbs, Khazars and the Kiev-Polessian Dialect. Trends in linguistics / Studies and monographs: Studies and monographs. Vol. 136. Walter de Gruyter. ISBN 978-3-11-017258-4.
- — (2002b). "Languages in Contact: The Case of Rotwelsch and the Two Yiddishes". In Hsia, R. Po-Chia; Lehmann, Hartmut (eds.). In and Out of the Ghetto: Jewish-Gentile Relations in Late Medieval and Early Modern Germany. Cambridge University Press. pp. 109–112. ISBN 978-052152289-2.
- — (2006). Jewish and Non-Jewish Creators of "Jewish" Languages: With Special Attention to Judaized Arabic, Chinese, German, Greek, Persian, Portuguese, Slavic (modern Hebrew/Yiddish), Spanish, and Karaite, and Semitic Hebrew/Ladino; a Collection of Reprinted Articles from Across Four Decades with a Reassessment. Otto Harrassowitz Verlag. ISBN 978-344705404-1.
- — (2007). "Yiddish Evidence for the Khazar Component in the Ashkenazic ethnogenesis". In Golden, Peter B.; Ben-Shammai, Haggai; Róna-Tas, András (eds.). The World of the Khazars: New Perspectives. Handbuch der Orientalistik: Handbook of Uralic studies. Vol. 17. BRILL. pp. 387–398. ISBN 978-90-04-16042-2.
- — (2012). The Non-Jewish Origins of the Sephardic Jews. SUNY Press. ISBN 978-143842393-7.
- — (2021). Silk Road Linguistics: The birth of Yiddish and the multiethnic Jewish peoples on the Silk Roads, 9–13th centuries: The indispensable role of the Arabs, Chinese, Germans, Iranians, Slavs and Turks. Studies in Arabic Language and Literature. Vol. 10. Harrassowitz Verlag. ISBN 978-3-447-11573-5.

== See also ==
- Khazar hypothesis
- Pseudoscientific language comparison

== Sources ==
- Aptroot, Marion (2016). "Yiddish Language and Ashkenazic Jews: A Perspective from Culture, Language, and Literature". Genome Biology and Evolution. 8 (6): 1948–1949. doi:10.1093/gbe/evw131. PMC 4943202. PMID 27289098.
- Aronson, Howard I. (Spring 1995). "Review: The Balkan Substratum of Yiddish by Paul Wexler". Slavic Review. 54 (1): 162. doi:10.2307/2501149. JSTOR 2501149. S2CID 164689332.
- Beider, Alexander (2015). Origins of Yiddish Dialects. Oxford University Press. ISBN 978-0-191-05981-0.
- Coler, Matt (2014). A Grammar of Muylaq' Aymara: Aymara as spoken in Southern Peru. Brill. ISBN 978-9-004-28400-5.
- Danylenko, Andrii (Summer 2022). "Review: The Encyclopedia of Yiddish Pre-History". Slavic and East European Journal. 66 (2): 292–299.
- Das, Ranajit; Wexler, Paul; Pirooznia, Mehdi; Elhaik, Eran (2016). "Localizing Ashkenazic Jews to primeval villages in the ancient Iranian lands of Ashkenaz". Genome Biology and Evolution. 8 (4): 1132–1149. doi:10.1093/gbe/evw046. PMC 4860683. PMID 26941229.
- Das, Ranajit; Wexler, Paul; Pirooznia, Mehdi; Elhaik, Eran (June 21, 2017). "The Origins of Ashkenaz, Ashkenazic Jews, and Yiddish". Frontiers in Genetics. 8 (87): 87. doi:10.3389/fgene.2017.00087. PMC 5478715. PMID 28680441.
- Flegontov, Pavel; Kassian, Alexei; Thomas, Mark G.; Fedchenko, Valentina; Changmai, Piya; Starostin, George (July 2016). "Pitfalls of the Geographic Population Structure (GPS) Approach Applied to Human Genetic History: A Case Study of Ashkenazi Jews". Genome Biology and Evolution. 8 (7): 2259–2265. doi:10.1093/gbe/evw162. PMC 4987117. PMID 27389685.
- Fleischer, Jürg (2018). "Western Yiddish and Judeo-German". In Hary, Benjamin; Benor, Sarah Bunin (eds.). Languages in Jewish Communities, Past and Present. Walter de Gruyter. pp. 239–275. ISBN 978-1-501-50463-1.
- Hertz, Deborah (2002). "Contacts and Relations in the Pre-Emancipation Period: A Comment". In Hsia, R. Po-Chia; Lehmann, Hartmut (eds.). In and Out of the Ghetto: Jewish-Gentile Relations in Late Medieval and Early Modern Germany. Cambridge University Press. pp. 151–160. ISBN 978-052152289-2.
- Horvath, J.; Wexler, Paul, eds. (1997). Relexification in Creole and Non-Creole Languages. Wiesbaden: Harrassowitz Verlag. ISBN 978-344703954-3.
- Jacobs, Neil G. (2005). Yiddish: A Linguistic Introduction. Cambridge University Press. ISBN 978-0-521-77215-0.
- Johnson, George (October 29, 1996). "Scholars Debate Roots of Yiddish, Migration of Jews". The New York Times.
- Kamusella, Tomasz (2022). "Review: Silk Road Linguistics: The Birth of Yiddish and the Multiethnic Jewish Peoples on the Silk Roads,9–13th Centuries". Slavonic and East European Review. 100 (2): 355–357. doi:10.1353/see.2022.0018. S2CID 253371734.
- Kaplan, Rose (April 26, 2016). "Study Claims Yiddish Originated in Turkey". Tablet magazine.
- Katz, Dovid (1987). "The Proto Dialectology of Ashkenaz". In Katz, Dovid (ed.). The origins of the Yiddish language (PDF). Winter Studies in Yiddish. Vol. 1. Pergamon Press. pp. 47–60.
- Katz, Dovid (2019). "Tsu der metodológye fun der histórisher yídisher lingvístik". In Buschinger, Danielle; Rosenstein, Roy (eds.). Jewish Identity and Comparative Studies: Festschrift for Astrid Starck-Adler (PDF). Amiens: Centre d'Études Médiévales de Picardie. pp. 1–12.
- Kerler, Dov-Ber, ed. (1991). History of Yiddish Studies. Winter studies in Yiddish. Vol. 3. Routledge. pp. 149–152. ISBN 978-3-718-65060-6.
- Mignon, Laurent (2015). "Judeo-Turkish". In Kahn, L.; Rubin, A.D. (eds.). Handbook of Jewish Languages. Brill. pp. 634–640. doi:10.1163/9789004297357_024. ISBN 978-900429735-7.
- Philologos (July 20, 2014). "The Origins of Yiddish, Part Dray". The Forward.
- Slobodjans'kyj, Pavlo (December 1988). "Review: Origins of the Yiddish Language by Dovid Katz". Language. 64 (4): 761–766. doi:10.2307/414568. JSTOR 414568.
- Spolsky, Bernard (2014). The Languages of the Jews: A Sociolinguistic History. Cambridge University Press. ISBN 978-110705544-5.
- Ungar-Sargon, Batya (June 23, 2014). "The Mystery of the Origins of Yiddish Will Never Be Solved". Tablet magazine.
- Woodworth, Cherie (2014). "Where Did Yiddish Come From?". Tablet magazine.
