= Pseudoscientific language comparison =

Form of pseudo-scholarship

Pseudoscientific language comparison is a form of pseudo-scholarship that aims to establish historical associations between languages by naïve postulations of similarities between them.

While comparative linguistics also studies how languages are historically related, linguistic comparisons are deemed pseudoscientific when they do not follow the established practices. Pseudoscientific language comparison is usually performed by people with little or no specialization in the field of comparative linguistics. It is a widespread type of linguistic pseudoscience.

The most common method applied in pseudoscientific language comparisons is to search different languages for words that sound and mean alike. Such similarities often seem convincing to laymen, but linguistic scientists see this kind of comparison as unreliable for two primary reasons. First, the criterion of similarity is subjective and thus not subject to verification or falsification, which runs against scientific principles. Second, because there are so many words, it is easy to find coincidental similarities.

Because of its lack of reliability, the method of searching for isolated similar words is rejected by nearly all comparative linguists (however, see mass comparison for a controversial method that operates by similarity). Instead, experts use the comparative method. This means that they search for consistent patterns between the languages' phonology, grammar and core vocabulary. This technique helps linguists to figure out whether the hypothesized relatedness really exists.

Certain languages seem to get much more attention in pseudoscientific comparisons than others. These include languages of ancient civilizations such as Egyptian, Etruscan or Sumerian; language isolates or near-isolates such as Basque, Japanese and Ainu; and languages that are not related to their geographical neighbors such as Hungarian.

== Political or religious implications ==
Sometimes, languages are associated for political or religious reasons, despite a lack of support from accepted methods of science or historical linguistics. For example, it was argued by Niclas Wahlgren that Herman Lundborg encouraged that the posited Ural-Altaic or Turanian, language family, which seeks to relate Sami to the Mongolian language, was used to justify Swedish racism towards the Sami people in particular. (There are also strong, albeit areal not genetic, similarities between the Uralic, Turkic, and Mongolic languages, which provide a more benign but nonetheless incorrect basis for this theory.)

Some believers in Abrahamic religions have sought to derive their native languages from Classical Hebrew. For example, Herbert W. Armstrong, a proponent of British Israelism, claimed that the word 'British' comes from Hebrew בְּרִית brit [bʁit] 'covenant' and אּישׁ ʾiš [iʃ] 'man', as supposed proof that the British people are the 'covenant people' of God. Pre-modern scholars of the Hebrew Bible, debating the language spoken by Adam and Eve, often relied on belief in the literal truth of Genesis and of the accuracy of the names transcribed therein. On the other hand, Renaissance scholars Johannes Goropius Becanus (1519–1572) and Simon Stevin argued that the Adamic language had been a dialect of their own native language, Dutch.

The Sun Language Theory, positing a proto-Turkic language as the ancestor of all human languages, was motivated by Turkish nationalism.

The Israeli-American linguist Paul Wexler is known for his fringe theories about the origin of Jewish populations and Jewish languages:

- that most Ashkenazi Jews are of Turkic origin, and that their language, Yiddish, ultimately comes from Judaeo-Slavic
- that most Sephardi Jews are of Berber origin, as is their language, Ladino

In the mid-1900s, The Lithuanian–American archaeologist Marija Gimbutas argued that Basque is clearly related to the extinct Pictish and Etruscan languages, even though at least the comparison had earlier been rejected within a decade of being proposed in 1892 by Sir John Rhys. She wanted to show Basque was a remnant of an "Old European culture".

== Traits and characteristics ==
There is no universal way to spot pseudoscientific language comparisons. Indeed, such comparisons may not fit into one single category. However, the following characteristics tend to be more common among pseudoscientific theories (and the people who support them) than among scientific ones:

- Failure to apply an accepted, or at least systematic, method to show regular correspondences between the languages. Unsystematic comparisons are effectively unfalsifiable.
- Failure to present grammatical evidence for relatedness: claims are based exclusively on word comparisons, even though in comparative linguistics grammatical evidence is also needed to confirm relatedness.
- Arbitrary segmentation of compared forms: comparisons are based on the similarity of only a part of the words compared (usually the first syllable), while the rest of the word is ignored.
- Disregard for the effects of morphology on word structure: uninflected root forms may be compared with fully inflected forms, or marked forms may be used in preference to lesser- or unmarked forms.
- Not thinking about borrowing and areal features. Neighboring languages may share much vocabulary and many grammatical features due to language contact. To really know whether the similarities result from contact or from relatedness, we need to use the comparative method adequately.
- Relying on typological similarities between languages: the morphological type of the language is claimed to provide evidence for relatedness, but in comparative linguistics only material parallels are accepted as evidence of a historical connection.
- Neglect of known history: present-day forms of words are used in comparisons, neglecting either the attested or the reconstructed history of the language in question, or words of varying time depths (such as current, archaic, and reconstructed words) and reliability of reconstruction are used interchangeably.
- Advocation of geographically far-fetched connections, such as comparing Finnish (in Finland) to Quechua (in Peru), or Basque (in Spain and France) to Ainu (in Japan), or Tamil (in India) to Korean (in Korea). This criterion is only suggestive, though, as a long distance does not exclude the possibility of a relationship: English is demonstrably related to Hindi (in India), and Hawaiian to Malagasy (on Madagascar).
- Advocacy of fanciful narratives based on the purported linguistic findings, e.g. claims of unknown civilizations or ancient people traveling across oceans.

Proponents of pseudoscientific language comparisons also tend to share some common characteristics with pseudoscientists in other fields of science:

- Overestimation of their own knowledge or competence in one or more of the languages under comparison, or their historical development, and underestimation of experts' knowledge. For example, assigning of incorrect meanings to words or sentences, quoting of rare or even fake lexemes, morphs or meanings or of obscure dialect forms, misinterpretation of what experts have written, or ignorance of important facts. When forms and meanings are simply compiled and quoted from dictionaries (or even only a single source), inaccuracies creep in very easily. Even linguistically trained native speakers may not be experts in their own language, its dialectology, and its history; and even professional linguists may not be experts in large numbers of diverse languages and families.
- Claims that the purported remote linguistic relationship is clear. A distant relationship between languages is usually not obvious on a superficial examination, and can only be uncovered via a successful application of the comparative method.
- Failure to submit results to peer reviewed linguistic journals.
- Assertion that people who criticize the theory are just stuck in old ways, have ideological motivations, or are part of a secret plan by the language experts.

== See also ==
- Alternative theories of Hungarian language origins
- Bongo-Bongo (linguistics)
- Cal-Ugrian theory
- False cognate
- False etymology
- Folk linguistics
- Lumpers and splitters
- Mythical origins of language
- Proto-World
