= Knaanic language =

Extinct West Slavic Jewish language

Knaanic
- Region: Europe
- Ethnicity: Czech Jews
- Extinct: Late Middle Ages
- Language family: Indo-European: Balto-Slavic; Slavic; West Slavic; Czech–Slovak; Knaanic

Language codes
- ISO 639-3: czk
- Glottolog: west3000

Knaanic (also called Canaanic, Leshon Knaan, Judaeo-Czech, Judeo-Slavic) is a tentative name for a number of West Slavic dialects or registers formerly spoken by the Jews in the lands of the Western Slavs, notably the Czech lands, but also the lands of modern Poland, Lusatia, and other Sorbian regions. They became extinct in the Late Middle Ages. Very little is known about their difference from the surrounding Slavic languages. The largest number of samples of Knaanic written in Hebrew script are in Czech; therefore, most commonly Knaanic is associated with Old Czech.

== Etymology ==
The name comes from the "land of Knaan", a geo-ethnological term denoting the Jewish populations living principally in Czechia, though sometimes applied to all Jewish populations east of the Elbe River (as opposed to the Ashkenazi Jews, living to its west, or the Sephardi Jews of the Iberian Peninsula). As such, the land is often translated as simply Slavonia or Slavic Europe.

The term is derived from ancient Canaan (Hebrew: כנען, kəna'an).

== History ==
The language became extinct some time in the Late Middle Ages, possibly because of the expansion of the Ashkenazi culture and its own Yiddish language, descended from early Middle High German. That hypothesis is often backed by the large number of Yiddish loanwords of Slavic origin, many of which were no longer in use in Slavic languages at the time of the Ashkenazi expansion. They are believed to come from Knaanic rather than from Czech, Sorbian or Polish. The linguist Paul Wexler has hypothesised that Knaanic is actually the direct predecessor of Yiddish and that the language later became Germanised. In other words, the Knaanim, that is, the people speaking the Judaeo-Slavic languages, were the main cause of changes in Yiddish. That view has been dismissed by nearly all mainstream academics, however, and contrasts with the more widely accepted theories of Max Weinreich, who argued that Slavic loanwords were assimilated only after Yiddish had already been fully formed. The Jewish commentator Rashi was aware of this language.

=== Coinage ===
A possible early example of Knaanic is a 9th-century letter for a Jewish community of Ruthenia. One of the very few commonly accepted examples of Knaanic is inscriptions on bracteate coins issued under Mieszko the Old and Leszek the White, two Polish rulers of 12th and 13th century. The last evidence of usage of the language (written with the Hebrew script) comes from the 16th century.

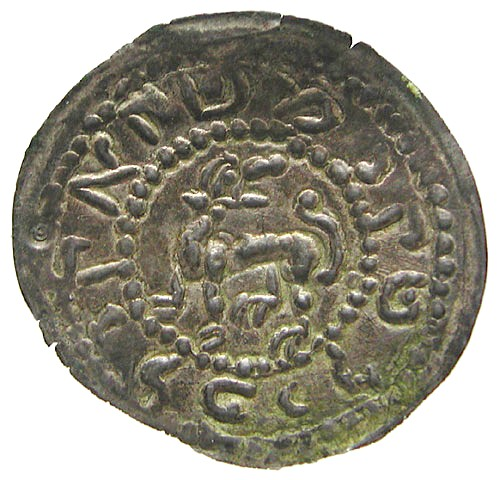
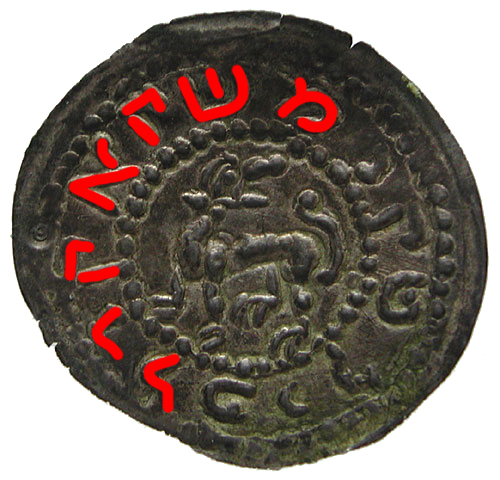

The reason that Knaanic inscriptions, which use Hebrew letters, appear on coins minted for a Polish duke is that, at the time, he leased some mints to Jews. The mint masters were responsible for collecting bullion and striking coins as well as periodically taking in and restriking existing coins.

The inscriptions on the coins range widely. Some are Hebrew names, possibly those of the mintmasters. Some are the names of the towns in which the mint operated, for instance Kalisz, the burial place of Mieszko the Old. Some have the duke's name. One in the National Bank of Poland's numismatic collection bears the word bracha, Hebrew for blessing.

Inscription (Knaanic)	משקא קרל פלסק
Transcription	mškʾ krl plsk
Interpretation (Polish)	Mieszko, król Polski
Translation	'Mieszko, king of Poland'

== Classification ==
In the 15th edition of Ethnologue (2005) assigned code czk to it and said that the term Knaanic is used primarily for Jewish Czech, possibly also for other Jewish variants of West Slavic languages, extinct in the Middle Ages. The 16th edition (2009) no longer lists Knaanic among the West Slavic languages. It mentioned it only as an "extinct or artificial" language without further specification and refers to the Linguist List portal.

As of 2023 Ethnologue once again lists Knaanic as a Czech–Slovak language.

== See also ==
- Jewish languages
- Judaeo-Spanish (Ladino)
- Odesan Russian
- Religiolect

== Literature ==
- Bondyová, Ruth (2003). Mezi námi řečeno. Jak mluvili Židé v Čechách a na Moravě [Between us: language of Jews in Bohemia and Moravia] (in Czech). Society of Franz Kafka]. ISBN 80-85844-88-5. The book documents languages used by Jews in the Czech lands during 12–20th century. Review in Czech, pages 28–33.
- (In Czech) Šedinová, Jiřina: "Literatura a jazyk Židů v Českých zemích", in EUROLITTERARIA & EUROLINGUA 2005, Technická univerzita v Liberci, Liberec 2005. Jiřina Šedinová from the Charles University in Prague seems to be the only specialist to study the glosses written in leshon kenaan which appear in some Jewish religious texts from Bohemia. In this article the author affirms leshon kenaan is just the Hebrew term for the local Slavic language.
- Max Weinreich, History of the Yiddish Language, 1980, ISBN 0-226-88604-2
