= Ronnie Hsia =

American historian

Ronnie Po-Chia Hsia (夏伯嘉; born November 15, 1955) is an American historian and the Edwin Erle Sparks Professor at Pennsylvania State University, where he teaches history and religious studies. His research interests are Catholic Renewal, anti-Semitism and Protestant Reformation.

== Education ==
Hsia was born in Hong Kong and studied in the United States. He earned his B.A. in 1977 at Swarthmore College and an M.A. in 1978 at Harvard University. He has also earned three degrees from Yale: an M.A. in 1979, an M.Phil in History in 1979, and a Ph.D in 1982. He became an American citizen in 1980.

== Publications ==
- The Myth of Ritual Murder: Jews and Magic in Reformation Germany (Yale University Press, 1988)
- Social Discipline in the Reformation: Central Europe, 1550-1750 (Routledge, 1989)
- Trent 1475: Stories of a Ritual Murder Trial (Yale University Press, 1992).
- The World of Catholic Renewal, 1540-1770 (Cambridge University Press, 1998).
- A Jesuit in the Forbidden City: Matteo Ricci 1553-1610 (Oxford University Press, 2010).
