= Genome Biology and Evolution =

- Discipline: Evolutionary biology, genomics
- Language: English
- Edited by: Adam Eyre-Walker, Laura A. Katz

Publication details
- History: 2009–present
- Publisher: Oxford University Press
- Frequency: Monthly
- Open access: Yes
- Impact factor: 3.3 (2022)

Standard abbreviations
- ISO 4: Genome Biol. Evol.

Indexing
- CODEN: GBEEA5
- ISSN: 1759-6653
- OCLC no.: 710017802

Links
- Journal homepage; Online access

Genome Biology and Evolution is a monthly peer-reviewed open access scientific journal published by Oxford University Press on behalf of the Society for Molecular Biology and Evolution. It covers research on the interface between evolutionary biology and genomics. According to the Journal Citation Reports, the journal has a 2022 impact factor of 3.3.
