= Prince (disambiguation) =

A prince is a member of royalty or of the high aristocracy.

Prince or The Prince may also refer to:

== Places ==
=== Canada ===
- Prince (electoral district), Prince Edward Island
- Prince, Ontario, a township
- Prince, Saskatchewan, a hamlet
- Prince County, Prince Edward Island

=== United States ===
- Prince, West Virginia, an unincorporated census-designated place
- Prince Island, a small island near San Miguel Island, California

=== Elsewhere ===
- Princé, a commune in the department of Ille-et-Vilaine, France
- Prince Islands, off the coast of Istanbul, Turkey

== People and fictional characters ==
- Prince (given name), a list of people
- Prince (surname), a list of people and fictional characters
- Prince (musician), American singer-songwriter and musician born Prince Rogers Nelson (1958–2016)
- Mahesh Babu (born 1975), Indian actor, nicknamed "Prince"
- Mr. Lexx (born 1974), Jamaican dancehall artist, nicknamed "The Prince"

== Arts and entertainment ==
=== Fictional characters ===
- Prince (Prince of Persia), from the video game Prince of Persia
- Prince (Sand Land), or Beelzebub, the main character in the Sand Land universe
- Prince, a character from the television show Lexx
- The Prince, the main character of the video game Katamari Damacy
- The Prince, a character from Disney's Snow White and the Seven Dwarfs (1937 film)

=== Television ===
- The Prince (TV series), an animated sitcom on HBO Max
- "Prince" (New Girl), a 2014 episode

=== Films ===
- Prince (1969 film), a Hindi film
- The Prince (1996 film), a Malayalam film
- Prince (2010 film), a Hindi film
- Prince (2011 film), a Kannada film
- The Prince (2014 film), an American gangster thriller
- The Prince (2019 film), a Chilean film
- Prince (2022 film), an Indian romantic comedy
- Prince: Once Upon a Time in Dhaka, a Bangladeshi film
- The Prince (upcoming film), an upcoming American film

=== Music ===
- Prince (album), 1979, by Prince
- "Prince" (song), by Versailles
- "Prince", a song by Apink from the EP Snow Pink
- "Prince", a song by Deftones from Diamond Eyes
- "Prince", a song by Vanessa Carlton from Be Not Nobody
- "The Prince" (song), a single by Madness
- "The Prince", a song by Diamond Head
- "The Prince", a song by Madeon

=== Other uses in arts and entertainment ===
- Orange Prince, a painting by Andy Warhol of the singer Prince, also known as Prince
- The Prince (1984), a video game published by Cases Computer Simulations
- The Prince (anthology), a 2002 book by Jerry Pournelle and S. M. Stirling
- The Prince (novel), 2005, by Francine Rivers
- The Prince (play), 2022, written by Abigail Thorn

== Brands and products ==
- Prince (cigarette), a brand of cigarettes
- Prince (software), an XML + CSS formatter, from YesLogic, formerly Prince XML
- Prince spaghetti, a brand of pasta owned by Winland Foods
- Princes Group, an Anglo-Italian manufacturing group of food products

== Naval ships ==
- HMS Prince, six Royal Navy ships
- HMS Rajah (D10), an escort aircraft carrier at one point named USS Prince, transferred to the Royal Navy in 1943

== Organizations and enterprises ==
- Prince Group, a Cambodian conglomerate
- Prince Hotels, a Japanese company headquartered in Tokyo
- Prince Music Theater, a non-profit theatrical producing organization in Philadelphia, Pennsylvania, US
- Prince Sports, an American manufacturer of sporting goods
- Prince's Theatre, a former name of Shaftesbury Theatre, a London West End theatre

== Transportation ==
=== Aircraft ===
- Fairey P.12 Prince, a British experimental 12-cylinder aircraft engine
- Fairey P.16 Prince, a British experimental 16-cylinder aircraft engine
- Percival Prince, a British light transport aircraft first flown in 1948
- Prince Aircraft, an American manufacturer of aircraft propellers

=== Motor vehicles ===
- Daewoo Prince, a mid-size luxury car produced in South Korea between 1991 and 1997
- Prince engine, a four-cylinder petrol engine manufactured by BMW and Stellantis
- Prince Motor Company, a producer of automobiles in Japan from 1952 until their merger with Nissan in 1966

=== Railway locomotives ===
- Prince, one of the original locomotives on the Festiniog Railway
- Prince, a South Devon Railway 2-4-0ST steam locomotive

== Other uses ==
- The Prince, a 16th century political treatise written by Niccolò Machiavelli
- The Prince, the fruiting body or mushroom of the fungus Agaricus augustus
- PRINCE (cipher), a block cipher targeting low latency, unrolled hardware implementations
- "Projects In Controlled Environments" and "PROMPT II in the CCTA Environment" (PRINCE), a structured project management method

== See also ==
- Princes (disambiguation) including Prince's
- Princess (disambiguation)
- Prinz (disambiguation)
- Prinze (surname)
