= Princess (disambiguation) =

Princess is a title of royalty or nobility. It may also refer to:

== Places ==
- Princess, Kentucky, United States, an unincorporated community
- Princess, a locality in the County of Newell, Alberta, Canada

== People ==
- Princess (singer) (born 1961), 1980s pop music singer
- The Princess (drag queen), American drag queen

=== Given name ===
- Princess Punzalan (born 1968), Filipino actress
- Princess Guevarra (born 1999), Filipino singer
- Nathalie Hart (born 1992), Australian-Filipino actress whose real name is Princess Tinkerbell Snell

== Arts, entertainment, and media ==
=== Film and television ===
- Princess (2006 film), a Danish animated film
- Princess (2008 film), an American TV movie
- Princess (2010 film), a Finnish film
- Princess (2014 film), an Israeli film
- Princess (2022 film), an Italian film
- Princess (web series), Flash animation by Matt Stone and Trey Parker
- Princess (TV series), a money management reality program
- Princesses (TV series), 1991 American situation comedy
- Princess, a character in the Canadian cartoon My Pet Monster
- Princess, the nickname of the main character Aelita Scaheffer from the French animated series Code Lyoko and Code Lyoko: Evolution
- Princess Buchanan, a character from the BBC soap opera Doctors
- Princess (The Walking Dead), a fictional character from The Walking Dead

=== Music ===
==== Albums ====
- Princess (Princess album)
- Princess (Jam Hsiao album)
- Princess (EP), an EP by Sebadoh

==== Songs ====
- "Princess" (Dmitry Koldun song), 2009
- "Princess" (Short Stack song), 2009
- "Princess" (Drake song), 2026
- "Princess", a 2018 song by Ayesha Erotica
- "Princess", a song by Elton John from his album Jump Up!
- "Princess", a song by Meghan Trainor from her album Toy with Me

=== Other arts, entertainment, and media ===
- Princess (magazine), a Japanese manga magazine published by Akita Shoten
- Princess: A True Story of Life Behind the Veil in Saudi Arabia, a book by Jean Sasson
- Princess (poem), by Russian poet Apollon Maykov, published in 1878

== Brands and enterprises ==
- Princess (Beanie Baby), a collectible made by Ty Inc. in 1997 in memory of Princess Diana
- Princess Cruises, a cruise brand owned by Carnival Corporation & plc
- P&O Princess Cruises, a British shipping company that operated 2000-2003
- Disney Princess, a media franchise owned by The Walt Disney Company
- Fairmont Hamilton Princess, the oldest hotel in the Fairmont chains
- Princess telephone, a compact telephone designed for convenient use in the bedroom
- Princess Yachts, a UK motor yacht maker
- Princess, a fragrance by Vera Wang

== Theatres ==
- Princess Theatre (disambiguation)
- Princess or Princess's Theatre, London, which closed in 1902

== Transport ==
- Princess (car) (1975–81), a motor car produced in the United Kingdom by British Leyland from 1975 until 1981
- Austin Princess, Princess and Vanden Plas Princess (1947–68), a British motor car
- Saunders-Roe Princess, a very large British flying boat aircraft of the 1950s
- SS Princess, a Canadian steamboat
- Princess, a stern-wheel steamer acquired by the Union Navy as USS Naiad (1863) during the American Civil War

== Other uses ==
- HMS Princess, seven Royal Navy ships
- Princess (chess), a fairy chess piece moving as bishop or knight
- Princess (food), a Bulgarian open-faced baked sandwich made with minced meat
- Princess (beauty pageant), held in Japan
- Princess (pigeon), recipient of the Dickon Medal in 1946 for bravery during the Second World War

== See also ==
- Princess cut, the second most popular diamond cut shape
- The Princess (disambiguation)
- Princesse (disambiguation)
- Princes (disambiguation)
- Prince (disambiguation)
