= Prince (surname) =

Prince is a surname. Notable people with the surname include:

== A ==
- Alan Prince (born 1946), professor of linguistics
- Alexis Prince (born 1994), American basketball player
- Arthur Prince (disambiguation), several people
- Ashwell Prince (born 1977), South African cricketer, first non-white man to captain the South African cricket team

== B ==
- Bevin Prince (born 1982), American actress
- Bob Prince (1916–1985), American radio and television sportscaster, and commentator
- Brooklynn Prince (born 2010), American child actress

== C ==
- Charles Prince (born 1950), American former chairman and chief executive of Citigroup
- Christian Prince (1971–1991), American alumni of Yale
- Cushing Prince (1745–1827), American politician
- Cushing Prince Jr. (1786–1869), American sea captain

== D ==
- Dania Prince (born 1980), Honduran regional center of Southern Honduras, and international beauty queen who has held the title of Miss Earth 2003
- Darius Prince (born 1990), American football player
- Deantre Prince (born 2000), American football player
- Deneric Prince (born 2000), American football player
- Derek Prince (1915–2003), Bible teacher whose daily radio programme reached a worldwide audience
- Derek Stephen Prince (born 1969), American voice actor
- Dawn Prince-Hughes (born 1964), anthropologist, primatologist, and ethologist

== E ==
- Epiphanny Prince (born 1988), American professional women's basketball player
- Erik Prince (born 1969), founder and sole owner of the private military company Blackwater Worldwide
- Eric Prince (1924–2003), English retired footballer

== F ==
- Faith Prince (born 1957), American actress and singer
- Frankie Prince (born 1949), Welsh former footballer
- F. T. Prince (1912–2003), British poet and academic

== G ==
- Gerald Prince (born 1942), an academic and literary theoretician
- Gerrit Prince (born 1997), American football player
- Gina Prince-Bythewood (born 1969), American film director and writer

== H ==
- Harold Prince (1928–2019), American Broadway theatrical producer, and director
- Henry Prince, several people

== I ==
- Isaiah Prince (born 1997), American football player

== J ==
- Jerome Prince (legal scholar), American attorney, academic administrator, and legal scholar
- Jerome Prince (politician), mayor of Gary, Indiana
- Jerry L. Prince, American engineer working at Johns Hopkins University
- John Prince (disambiguation), several people
- Jonathan Prince (born 1958), American actor, director, screenwriter, and movie producer
- Josh Prince (born 1988), American baseball player
- Joseph Prince, a pastor and IT consultant

== K ==
- Karim Prince (born 1974), American actor
- Kevin-Prince Boateng (born 1987), footballer
- Kiyan Prince (1990–2006), English footballer

== L ==
- Louis Le Prince (born 1841, vanished 1890), French inventor who shot the first moving pictures on paper film
- Louis Le Prince (composer) (died 1677), French priest and composer

== M ==
- Mary Prince (c. 1788–after 1833), slave born in Bermuda whose autobiography was the first account of the life of a black woman to be published in the United Kingdom
- Miguel Augusto Prince (born 1957), Colombian football manager and former player
- Morton Prince (1854–1929), American physician who specialized in neurology

== P ==
- Paperboy Prince, American artist, community activist, and politician
- Percy S. Prince (1882–1930), American college sports coach
- Peter Prince (born 1942), British novelist
- Prairie Prince (born 1950), American rock drummer

== R ==
- R. J. Prince (born 1995), American football player
- Renate Prince, German-New Zealand architect
- Richard Prince (born 1949), American painter and photographer
- Robert Prince (video game composer) (1945–2026), video games music composer
- Roland Prince, Antiguan jazz guitarist
- Rolf Prince (1928–2017) chemical engineering professor
- Ron Prince (born 1969), African-American college football coach

== S ==
- Scott Prince (born 1980), Australian rugby league footballer
- Sedona Prince (born 2000), American women's basketball player

== T ==
- Taurean Prince (born 1994), American basketball player
- Tayshaun Prince (born 1980), American National Basketball Association player with the Memphis Grizzlies
- Tom Prince (baseball) (born 1964), American former Major League Baseball catcher
- Tommy Prince (1915–1977), one of Canada's most decorated First Nations soldiers

== V ==
- Viv Prince (1941–2025), English drummer

== Fictional characters ==
- Title character of the Franco-Belgian comics series Bernard Prince
- Diana Prince, secret identity of the DC Comics character Wonder Woman
- Eileen Prince, a witch and the mother of Severus Snape in the Harry Potter book series
- Gary Prince, the gender-swapped and real version of Princess Bubblegum in Adventure Time: Fionna and Cake
- Isambard Prince, main antagonist in seasons 3 and 4 of the TV series Lexx
- Martin Prince, a nerdy elementary school student in The Simpsons TV series
- Polly Prince, title character in the film Along Came Polly, played by Jennifer Aniston

== See also ==
- Price (surname)
- Prince
- Prince (given name)
- Princess
- Prinz
