= Apollon Maykov =

Russian poet and translator (1821–1897)

Apollon Nikolayevich Maykov
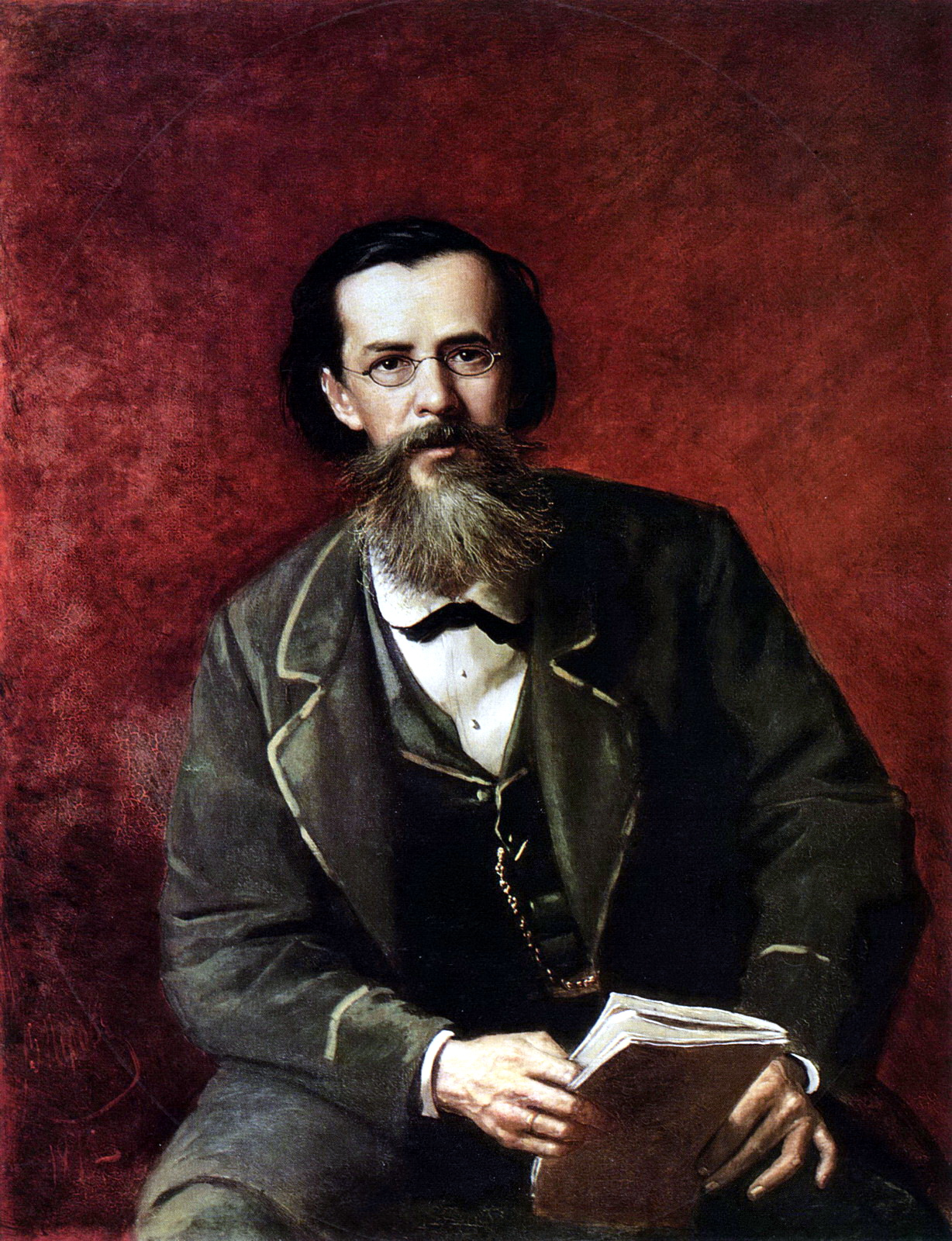
- Portrait of Maykov by Vasily Perov
- Born: 4 June [O.S. 23 May] 1821; Moscow, Imperial Russia
- Died: 20 March [O.S. 8 March] 1897 (aged 76); Saint Petersburg, Imperial Russia
- Resting place: Novodevichy Cemetery, Saint Petersburg
- Occupations: Poet, critic, essayist, translator
- Writing career
- Notable awards: Pushkin Prize

Apollon Nikolayevich Maykov (Russian: Аполло́н Никола́евич Ма́йков, 4 June [O.S. 23 May] 1821, Moscow – 20 March [O.S. 8 March] 1897, Saint Petersburg) was a Russian poet, best known for his lyric verse showcasing images of Russian villages, nature, and history. His love for ancient Greece and Rome, which he studied for much of his life, is also reflected in his works. Maykov spent four years translating the epic The Tale of Igor's Campaign (1870) into modern Russian. He translated the folklore of Belarus, Greece, Serbia and Spain, as well as works by Heine, Adam Mickiewicz and Goethe, among others. Several of Maykov's poems were set to music by Russian composers, among them Rimsky-Korsakov and Tchaikovsky.

Maykov was born into an artistic family and educated at home, by the writer Ivan Goncharov, among others. At the age of 15, he began writing his first poetry. After finishing his gymnasium course in just three years, he enrolled in Saint Petersburg University in 1837.

He began publishing his poems in 1840, and came out with his first collection in 1842. The collection was reviewed favorably by the influential critic Vissarion Belinsky. After this, he traveled throughout Europe, returning to Saint Petersburg in 1844, where he continued to publish poetry and branched out into literary criticism and essay writing.

He continued writing throughout his life, wavering several times between the conservative and liberal camps, but maintaining a steady output of quality poetical works. In his liberal days he was close to Belinsky, Nikolay Nekrasov, and Ivan Turgenev, while in his conservative periods he was close to Fyodor Dostoyevsky. He ended his life as a conservative. Maykov died in Saint Petersburg On 8 March 1897.

== Biography ==
Apollon Maykov was born into an artistic family. His father, Nikolay Maykov, was a painter, and in his later years an academic of the Imperial Academy of Arts. His mother, Yevgeniya Petrovna Maykova (née Gusyatnikova, 1803–1880), loved literature and later in life had some of her own poetry published. The boy's childhood was spent at the family estate just outside Moscow, in a house often visited by writers and artists. Maykov's early memories and impressions formed the foundation for his much lauded landscape lyricism, marked by what biographer Igor Yampolsky calls "a touchingly naive love for the old patriarchal ways."

In 1834 the family moved to Saint Petersburg. Apollon and his brother Valerian were educated at home, under the guidance of their father's friend Vladimir Solonitsyn, a writer, philologist and translator, known also for Nikolay Maykov's 1839 portrait of him. Ivan Goncharov, then an unknown young author, taught Russian literature to the Maykov brothers. As he later remembered, the house "was full of life, and had many visitors, providing a never ceasing flow of information from all kinds of intellectual spheres, including science and the arts." At the age of 15 Apollon started to write poetry. With a group of friends (Vladimir Benediktov, Ivan Goncharov and Pavel Svinyin among others) the Maykov brothers edited two hand-written magazines, Podsnezhnik (Snow-drop) and Moonlit Nights, where Apollon's early poetry appeared for the first time.

Maykov finished his whole gymnasium course in just three years, and in 1837 enrolled in Saint Petersburg University's law faculty. As a student he learned Latin which enabled him to read Ancient Roman authors in the original texts. He later learned Ancient Greek, but until then had to content himself with French translations of the Greek classics. It was at the university that Maykov developed his passionate love of Ancient Greece and Rome.

=== Literary career ===
Apollon Maykov's first poems (signed "M.") were published in 1840 by the Odessa Almanac and in 1841 by Biblioteka Dlya Chteniya and Otechestvennye Zapiski. He also studied painting, but soon chose to devote himself entirely to poetry. Instrumental in this decision was Pyotr Pletnyov, a University professor who, acting as a mentor for the young man, showed the first poems of his protégé to such literary giants as Vasily Zhukovsky and Nikolai Gogol. Maykov never became a painter, but the lessons he received greatly influenced his artistic worldview and writing style.

In 1842 his first collection Poems by A.N. Maykov was published, to much acclaim. "For me it sounds like Delvig's ideas expressed by Pushkin," Pletnyov wrote. Vissarion Belinsky responded with a comprehensive essay, praising the book's first section called "Poems Written for an Anthology", a cycle of verses stylized after both ancient Greek epigrams and the traditional elegy. He was flattered by the famous critic's close attention. (Note: There was a "cult of Belinsky" in the Maykov family, partly imposed upon them by Ivan Goncharov, for whom Belinsky was a genius.) Maykov paid heed to his advice and years later, working on the re-issues, edited much of the text in direct accordance with Belinsky's views.

After graduating from the university, Maykov joined the Russian Ministry of Finance as a clerk. Having received a stipend for his first book from Tsar Nicholas I, he used the money to travel abroad, visiting Italy (where he spent most of his time writing poetry and painting), France, Saxony, and Austria. In Paris Apollon and Valerian attended lectures on literature and fine arts at the Sorbonne and the Collège de France. On his way back Maykov visited Dresden and Prague where he met Václav Hanka and Pavel Jozef Šafárik, the two leaders of the national revival movement. The direct outcome of this voyage for Apollon Maykov was a University dissertation on the history of law in Eastern Europe.

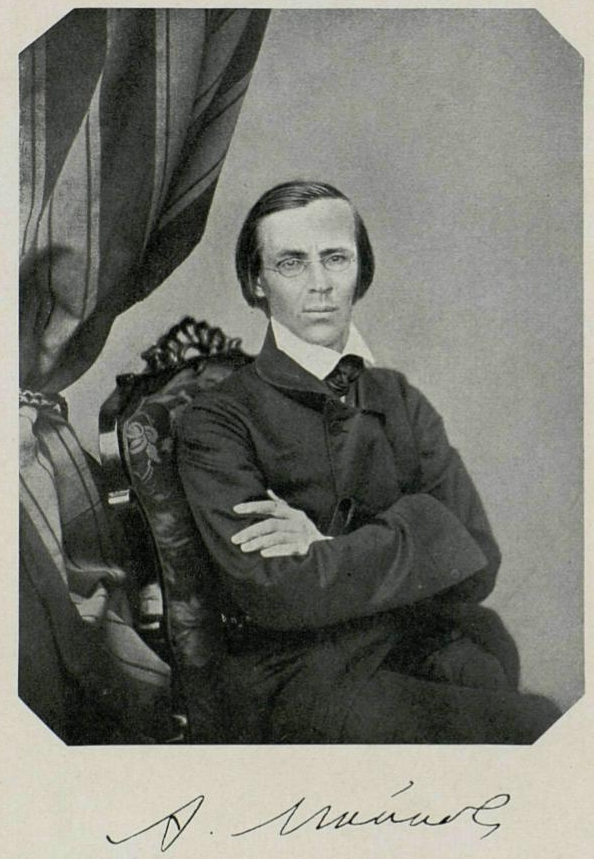
Maykov circa 1850

In 1844 Maykov returned to Saint Petersburg to join the Rumyantsev Museum library as an assistant. He became actively involved with the literary life of the Russian capital, contributing to Otechestvennye Zapiski, Finsky Vestnik and Sovremennik. He also debuted as a critic and published several essays on literature and fine art, reviewing works by artists like Ivan Aivazovsky, Fyodor Tolstoy and Pavel Fedotov.

In 1846 the Petersburg Anthology published his poem "Mashenka", which saw Maykov discarding elegy and leaning towards a more down-to-Earth style of writing. Again Belinsky was impressed, hailing the arrival of "a new talent, quite capable of presenting real life in its true light." The critic also liked Two Fates (Saint Petersburg, 1845). A "natural school" piece, touched by Mikhail Lermontov's influence, it featured "a Pechorin-type character, an intelligent, thinking nobleman retrogressing into a low-brow philistine," according to Alexander Hertzen's review. In the late 1840s Maykov was also writing prose, in a Gogol-influenced style known as the "physiological sketch". Among the short stories he published at the time were "Uncle's Will" (1847) and "The Old Woman – Fragments from the Notes of a Virtuous Man" (1848).

In the late 1840s Maykov entered Belinsky's circle and became friends with Nikolai Nekrasov and Ivan Turgenev. Along with his brother Valerian he started to attend Mikhail Petrashevsky's 'Secret Fridays', establishing contacts with Fyodor Dostoyevsky and Aleksey Pleshcheyev. Later, having been interrogated about his involvement, Maykov avoided arrest (he did not have a significant role in the group's activities), but for several years was kept under secret police surveillance. In the years to come Maykov, who never believed in the ideas of socialism, often expressed embarrassment over his involvement in the Petrashevsky affair. In an 1854 letter to M. A. Yazykov he confessed: "At the time I had very vague political ideas and was foolish enough to join a group where all the government's actions were criticized and condemned as wrong a priory, many of [its members] applauding every mistake, according to the logic of 'the worse they rule, the quicker they'll fall'. In the 1850s Maykov, now a Slavophile, began to champion 'firm' monarchy and strong Orthodox values. Writing to Aleksandr Nikitenko he argued: "Only a form of political system which had been proven by the test of history could be called viable". In 1852 Maykov moved into the office of the Russian Committee of Foreign censorship, where he continued working for the rest of his life, becoming its chairman in 1882.

In 1847 Maykov's second collection of poems, Sketches of Rome, the artistic outcome of his earlier European trip, was published. Informed with Belinsky's criticism, some poems were built on the juxtaposition of the majestic ruins and lush landscapes of 'classic' Rome with the everyday squalor of contemporary Italy. This homage to the "natural school" movement, though, did not make Maykov's style less flamboyant; on the contrary, it was in Sketches of Rome that he started to make full use of exotic epithets and colorful imagery.

In 1848–1852 Maykov wrote little, but became active during the Crimean War. First came the poem "Claremont Cathedral" (1853), an ode to Russia's historical feat of preventing the Mongol hordes from devastating European civilization. (Note: The same idea was central to Pushkin's famous letter to Pyotr Chaadayev (October 19, 1836), but the letter had not been published yet, so Maykov was almost certainly unaware of its existence.) This was followed by the compilation Poems, 1854. Some of the poems, like those about the siege of Sevastopol ("To General-Lieutenant Khrulyov") were welcomed by the literary left (notably Nekrasov and Chernyshevsky). Others ("In Memory of Derzhavin" and "A Message to the Camp") were seen as glorifying the monarchy and were deemed 'reactionary'. The last 1854 poem, "The Harlequin", was a caricature on a revolutionary keen to bring chaos and undermine centuries-old moral principles. Now a 'patriarchal monarchist', Maykov started to praise the Nikolai I regime. Another poem, "The Carriage", where Maykov openly supported the Tsar, was not included in 1854, but circulated in its hand-written version and did his reputation a lot of harm. Enemies either ridiculed the poet or accused him of political opportunism and base flattery. Some of his friends were positively horrified. In his epigrams, poet Nikolay Shcherbina labeled Maykov 'chameleon' and 'servile slave'. While social democrats (who dominated the Russian literary scene of the time) saw political and social reforms as necessary for Russia, Maykov called for the strengthening of state power.

After Russia's defeat in the war the tone of Maykov's poetry changed. Poems like "The war is over. Vile peace is signed...", "Whirlwind" (both 1856), "He and Her" (1867) criticized corrupt high society and weak, inadequate officials who were indifferent to the woes of the country and its people. Now openly critical of Nikolai I, Maykov admitted to having been wrong when professing a belief in the monarch.

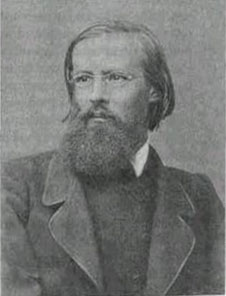
Maykov in the 1850s

In 1858 Maykov took part in the expedition to Greece on board the corvette Bayan. Prior to that he read numerous books about the country and learned the modern Greek language. Two books came out as a result of this trip: The Naples Album (which included "Tarantella", one of his best known poems) and Songs of Modern Greece. The former, focusing on contemporary Italian life, was coldly received by Russian critics who found it too eclectic. In retrospect it is regarded as a curious experiment in breaking genre barriers, with images and conversations from foreign life used to express things which in Russia could not be commented on publicly at the time. In the latter, the author's sympathy for the Greek liberation movement is evident.

The early 1860s saw Maykov's popularity on the rise: he often performed in public and had his works published by the leading Russian magazines. In the mid-1860s he once again drifted towards the conservative camp, and stayed there for the rest of his life. He condemned young radicals, and expressed solidarity with Mikhail Katkov's nationalistic remarks regarding the Polish Uprising and Russian national policy in general. In poems like "Fields" (which employed Gogol's metaphor of Russia as a troika, but also expressed horror at emerging capitalism), "Niva" and "The Sketch" he praised the 1861 reforms, provoking sharp criticism from Saltykov-Schedrin and Nikolay Dobrolyubov. Adopting the Pochvennichestvo doctrine, Maykov became close to Apollon Grigoriev, Nikolai Strakhov, and Fyodor Dostoyevsky; his friendship with the latter proved to be a particularly firm and lasting one.

In the 1860s and 1870s Maykov contributed mainly to Russky Vestnik. One of the leading proponents of Russian Panslavism, he saw his country as fulfilling its mission in uniting Slavs, but first and foremost freeing the peoples of the Balkans from Turkish occupation. "Once you've seen Russia in this [Panslavic] perspective, you start to understand its true nature and feel ready to devote yourself to this life-affirming cause," wrote Maykov in a letter to Dostoyevsky. The mission of art, according to the poet, was to develop the national self-consciousness and revive the 'historical memory' of Russians. The Slavic historic and moral basis on which it stood became the major theme of Maykov's poetry cycles "Of the Slavic World", "At Home", and "Callings of History". Well aware of the darker side of Russia's historic legacy, he still thought it necessary to highlight its 'shining moments' ("It's dear to me, before the icon...", 1868). Maykov was not a religious person himself but attributed great importance to the religious fervor of the common people, seeing it as the basis for 'moral wholesomeness' ("The spring, like an artist", 1859; "Ignored by all...", 1872). His religious poems of the late 1880s ("Let go, let go...", "The sunset’s quiet shine...", "Eternal night is near...") differed radically from his earlier odes to paganism. In them Maykov professed a belief in spiritual humility and expressed the conviction that this particular feature of the Russian national character would be its saving grace.

==== Maykov and revolutionary democrats ====
Unlike his artistic ally Afanasy Fet, Maykov always felt the need for maintaining 'spiritual bonds' with common people and, according to biographer Yampolsky, followed "the folk tradition set by Pushkin, Lermontov, Krylov and Koltsov". Yet he was skeptical of the doctrine of narodnost as formulated by Dobrolyubov and Chernyshevsky, who saw active promotion of the democratic movement as the mission of Russian literature. In 1853, horrified by Nekrasov's poem "The Muse", Maykov wrote "An Epistle to Nekrasov", in which he urged the latter to "dilute his malice in nature's harmony." Yet he never severed ties with his opponent and often gave him credit. "There is only one poetic soul here, and that is Nekrasov," Maykov wrote in an October 1854 letter to Ivan Nikitin.

According to Yampolsky, Nekrasov's poem "Grandfather" (1870, telling the story of a nobleman supporting the revolutionary cause) might have been an indirect answer to Maykov's poem "Grandmother" (1861) which praised the high moral standards of the nobility and condemned the generation of nihilists. Maykov's poem Princess (1876) had its heroine Zhenya, a girl from an aristocratic family, join a gang of conspirators and lose all notions of normality, religious, social or moral. However, unlike Vsevolod Krestovsky or Viktor Klyushnikov, Maykov treated his 'nihilist' characters rather like victims of the post-Crimean war social depression rather than villains in their own right.

==== The Tale of Igor's Campaign ====
Seeking inspiration and moral virtue in Russian folklore, which he called "the treasury of the Russian soul", Maykov tried to revive the archaic Russian language tradition. In his later years he made numerous freestyle translations and stylized renditions of Belarusian and Serbian folk songs. He developed a strong interest in non-Slavic folklore too, exemplified by the epic poems Baldur (1870) and Bringilda (1888) based on the Scandinavian epos.

In the late 1860s Maykov became intrigued by The Tale of Igor's Campaign, which his son was studying in gymnasium at the time. Baffled by the vagueness and occasional incongruity of all the available translations, he shared his doubts with professor Izmail Sreznevsky, who replied: "It is for you to sort these things out." Maykov later described the four years of work on the new translation that followed as his "second university". His major objective was to come up with undeniable proof of the authenticity of the old text, something that many authors, Ivan Goncharov among them, expressed doubts about. Ignoring Dostoyevsky's advice to use rhymes so as to make the text sound more modern, Maykov provided the first ever scientifically substantiated translation of the document, supplied with comprehensive commentaries. First published in the January 1870 issue of Zarya magazine, it is still regarded as one of the finest achievements of his career.

For Maykov, who took his historical poems and plays seriously, authenticity was the main objective. In his Old Believers drama The Wanderer (1867), he used the hand-written literature of raskolniks and, "having discovered those poetic gems, tried to re-mold them into... modern poetic forms," as he explained in the preface. In his historical works Maykov often had contemporary Russian issues in mind. "While writing of ancient history I was looking for parallels to the things that I had to live through. Our times provide so many examples of the rise and fall of the human spirit that an attentive eye looking for analogies can spot a lot," he wrote.

==== Christianity and paganism ====
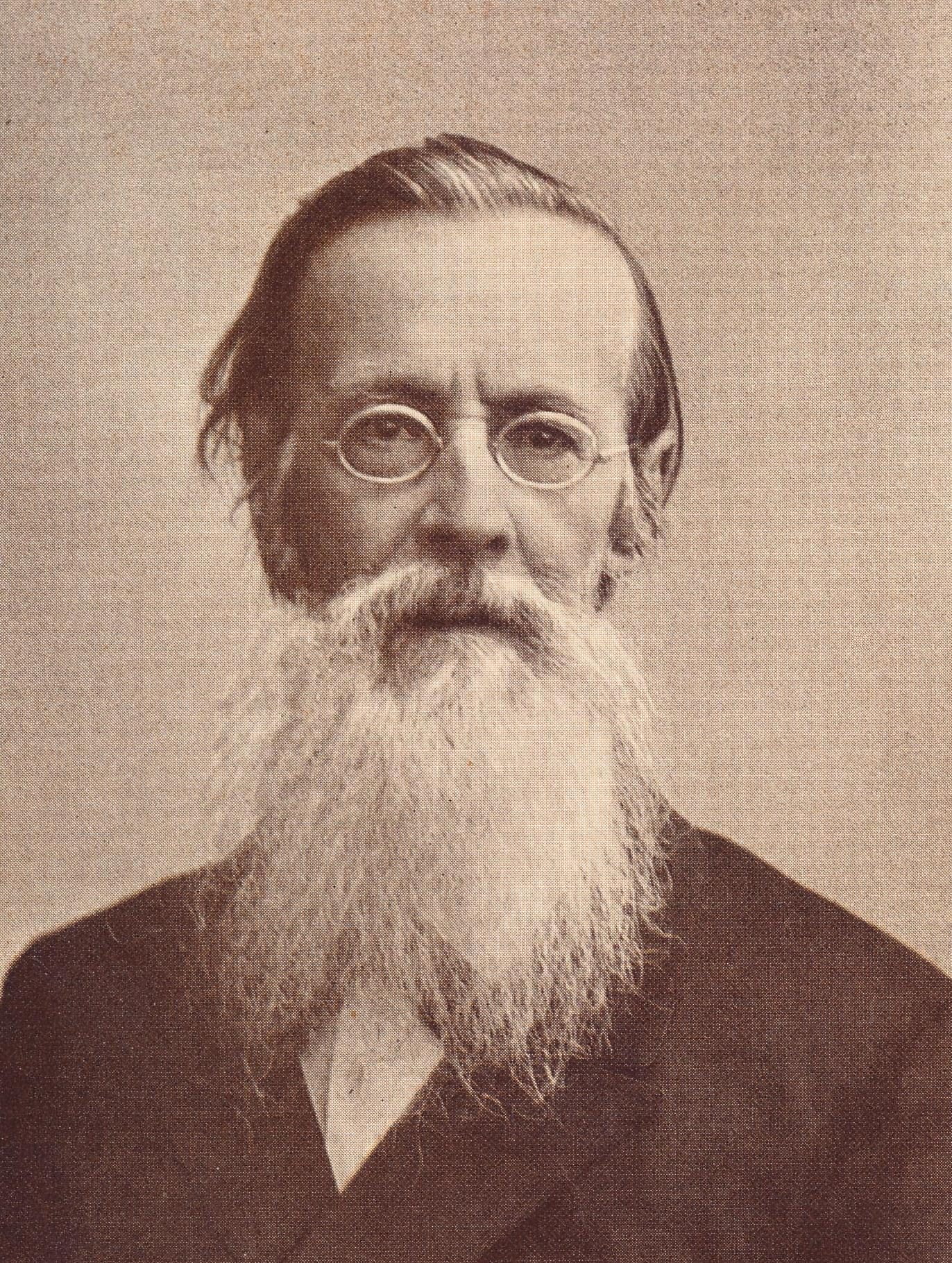
Maykov in his later years

Maykov's first foray into the history of early Christianity, "Olynthus and Esther" (1841) was criticized by Belinsky. He returned to this theme ten years later in the lyrical drama Three Deaths (1857), was dissatisfied with the result, and went on to produce part two, "The Death of Lucius" (1863). Three Deaths became the starting point of his next big poem, Two Worlds, written in 1872, then re-worked and finished in 1881. Following Belinsky's early advice, Maykov abandoned Lucius, a weak Epicurean, and made the new hero Decius, a patrician who, while hating Nero, still hopes for the state to rise up from its ashes. Like Sketches of Rome decades earlier, Two Worlds was a eulogy to Rome's eternal glory, its hero fighting Christianity, driven by the belief that Rome is another Heaven, "its dome embracing Earth."

While in his earlier years Maykov was greatly intrigued by antiquity, later in life he became more interested in Christianity and its dramatic stand against oppressors. While some contemporaries praised Maykov for his objectivity and scholarly attitude, the Orthodox Christian critics considered him to be "too much of a heathen" who failed to show Christianity in its true historical perspective. Later literary historians viewed Maykov's historical dramas favourably, crediting the author for neutrality and insight. Maykov's antiquity "lives and breathes, it is anything but dull," wrote critic F. Zelinsky in 1908. For the Two Worlds Maykov received The Russian Academy of Sciences' Pushkin Prize in 1882.

==== Last years ====
In 1858 Grigory Kushelev-Bezborodko published the first Maykov anthology Poems by Ap. Maykov. In 1879 it was expanded and re-issued by Vladimir Meshchersky. The Complete Maykov came out in 1884 (its second edition following in 1893). In the 1880s Maykov's poetry was dominated by religious and nationalistic themes and ideas. According to I. Yampolsky, only a few of his later poems ("Emshan", "The Spring", 1881) had 'indisputable artistic quality'. In his later years the poet wrote almost nothing new, engaging mostly in editing his earlier work and preparing them for compilations and anthologies. "Maykov lived the quiet, radiant life of an artist, evidently not belonging to our times... his path was smooth and full of light. No strife, no passions, no persecution," wrote Dmitry Merezhkovsky in 1908. Although this generalization was far from the truth, according to biographer F. Priyma, it certainly expressed the general public's perception of him.

Apollon Maykov died in Saint Petersburg On 8 March 1897. "His legacy will always sound as the mighty, harmonious and very complicated final chord to the Pushkin period of Russian poetry," wrote Arseny Golenishchev-Kutuzov in the Ministry of Education's obituary.

== Legacy ==
Maykov's initial rise to fame, according to the Soviet scholar Fyodor Pryima, had a lot to do with Pushkin and Lermontov's untimely deaths, and the feeling of desolation shared by many Russian intellectuals of the time. Vissarion Belinsky, who discovered this new talent, believed it was up to Maykov to fill this vacuum. "The emergence of this new talent is especially important in our times, when in the devastated Church of Art... we see but grimacing jesters entertaining dumb obscurants, egotistic mediocrities, merchants and speculators," Belinsky wrote, reviewing Maykov's debut collection.

The sleeve of Poems by Apollon Maykov in 2 volumes, 1858.

Hailing the emergence of a new powerful talent, Belinsky unreservedly supported the young author's 'anthological' stylizations based upon the poetry of Ancient Greece, praising "the plasticity and gracefulness of the imagery," the virtuosity in the art of the decorative, the "poetic, lively language" but also the simplicity and lack of pretentiousness. "Even in Pushkin's legacy this poem would have rated among his best anthological pieces," Belinsky wrote about the poem called "The Dream". Still, he advised the author to leave the 'anthological' realm behind as soon as possible and expressed dissatisfaction with poems on Russia's recent history. While admitting "Who's He" (a piece on Peter the Great, which some years later found its way into textbooks) was "not bad", Belinsky lambasted "Two Coffins", a hymn to Russia's victories over Karl XII and Napoleon.

Maykov's debut collection made him one of the leading Russian poets. In the 1840s "his lexical and rhythmic patterns became more diverse but the style remained the same, still relying upon the basics of classical elegy," according to the biographer Mayorova, who noted a strange dichotomy between the flamboyant wording and static imagery, and pointed to the "insurmountable distance between the poet and the world he pictured."

After Belinsky's death, Maykov started to waver between the two camps of the Westernizers and the Slavophiles, and the critics, accordingly, started to treat his work on the basis of their own political views in relation to the poet's changing ideological stance. Maykov's 1840s' "natural school"- influenced poems were praised (and published) by Nikolay Nekrasov. His later works, expressing conservative, monarchist and anti-'nihilist' views, were supported by Dostoyevsky, who on more than one occasion pronounced Maykov Russia's major poet.

In his 1895 article for the Brockhaus and Efron Encyclopedic Dictionary, the philosopher and critic Vladimir Solovyov argued that Maykov's dominant characteristics were "a serene, contemplating tone, elaborate patterns, a distinct and individual style (in form, although not in colors) with a relatively lackluster lyric side, the latter suffering obviously from too much attention to details, often at the expense of the original inspiration." Maykov's best works were, the critic opined, "powerful and expressive, even if not exceptionally sonorous." Speaking of Maykov's subject matter, Solovyov was almost dismissive:

Two major themes form the foundation of Maykov's poetry, the Ancient Greek aesthetic and historical myths of the Byzantine-Russian politics; bonded only by the poet's unreserved love for both, never merge... The concept of Byzantium, as the second Rome, though, has not crystallized as clear and distinct in the poet's mind as that of the original Roman Empire. He loves Byzantine/Russia in its historical reality, refusing to admit its faults and contradictions, tending to glorify even such monsters as Ivan the Terrible, whose "greatness", he believes, will be "recognised" in due time. [...] There was also a kind of background theme in his earlier work, the pastoral pictures of beautiful Russian nature, which the poet had all the better reason to enjoy for being a devout fisherman.

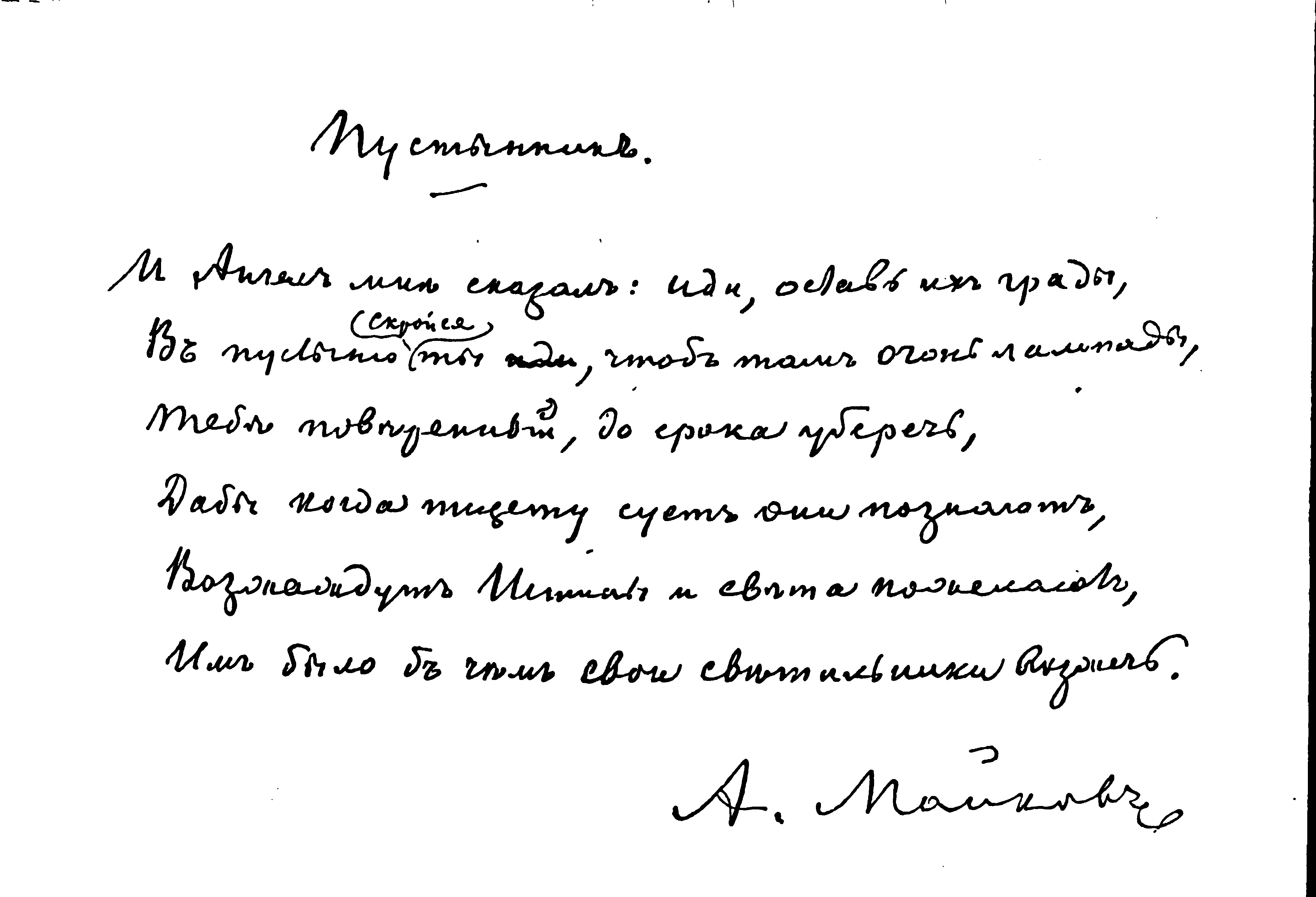
Autograph by Apollon Maikov of his poem "Pustinnik" (Hermit)

The modernist critic Yuly Aykhenvald, analyzing the cliché formula that bonded "Maykov, Polonsky and Fet" into a solid group of similar-minded authors, alleged that Maykov "to a lesser extent than the other two freed himself from the habit of copying classics" and "in his earlier works was unoriginal, producing verse that shone with reflected light." Not even his passionate love for classics could help the author submerge "wholly into the pagan element," the critic opined.

He was a scholar of antiquity and his gift, self-admittedly "has been strengthened by being tempered in the fire of science." As a purveyor of classicism, his very soul was not deep or naive enough to fully let this spirit in or embrace the antique idea of intellectual freedom. Poems, inhabited by naiads, nymphs, muses and dryads, are very pretty, and you can't help being enchanted by these ancient fables. But he gives you no chance to forget for a moment that – what for his ancient heroes was life itself, for him is only a myth, a 'clever lie' he could never believe himself.

All Maykov's strong points, according to the critic, relate to the fact that he learned painting, and, in a way, extended the art into his poetry. Aykhenvald gives him unreserved credit for the "plasticity of language, the unequalled turn at working on a phrase as if it was a tangible material." Occasionally "his lines are so interweaved, the verse looks like a poetic calligraphy; a scripturam continuam... Rarely passionate and showing only distant echoes of original inspiration, Maykov's verse strikes you with divine shapeliness... Maykov's best poems resemble statues, driven to perfection with great precision and so flawless as to make a reader feel slightly guilty for their own imperfection, making them inadequate to even behold what's infinitely finer than themselves," the critic argued.

Another Silver Age critic who noticed how painting and fishing might have influenced Maykov's poetry was Innokenty Annensky. In his 1898 essay on Maykov he wrote: "A poet usually chooses their own, particular method of communicating with nature, and often it is sports. Poets of the future might be cyclists or aeronauts. Byron was a swimmer, Goethe a skater, Lermontov a horse rider, and many other of our poets (Turgenev, both Tolstoys, Nekrasov, Fet, Yazykov) were hunters. Maykov was a passionate fisherman and this occupation was in perfect harmony with his contemplative nature, with his love for a fair sunny day which has such a vivid expression in his poetry." Putting Maykov into the "masters of meditation" category alongside Ivan Krylov and Ivan Goncharov, Annensky continued: "He was one of those rare harmonic characters for whom seeking beauty and working upon its embodiments was something natural and easy, nature itself filling their souls with its beauty. Such people, rational and contemplative, have no need for stimulus, praise, strife, even fresh impressions... their artistic imagery growing as if from soil. Such contemplative poets produce ideas that are clear-cut and 'coined', their images are sculpture-like," the critic argued.

Annensky praised Maykov's gift for creating unusual combinations of colors, which was "totally absent in Pushkin's verse, to some extent known to Lermontov, 'a poet of mountains and clouds' ...and best represented by the French poets Baudelaire and Verlaine." "What strikes one is Maykov's poetry's extraordinary vigor, the freshness and firmness of the author's talent: Olympians and the heroes of Antiquity whom he befriended during his childhood years… must have shared with him their eternal youth," Annensky wrote.

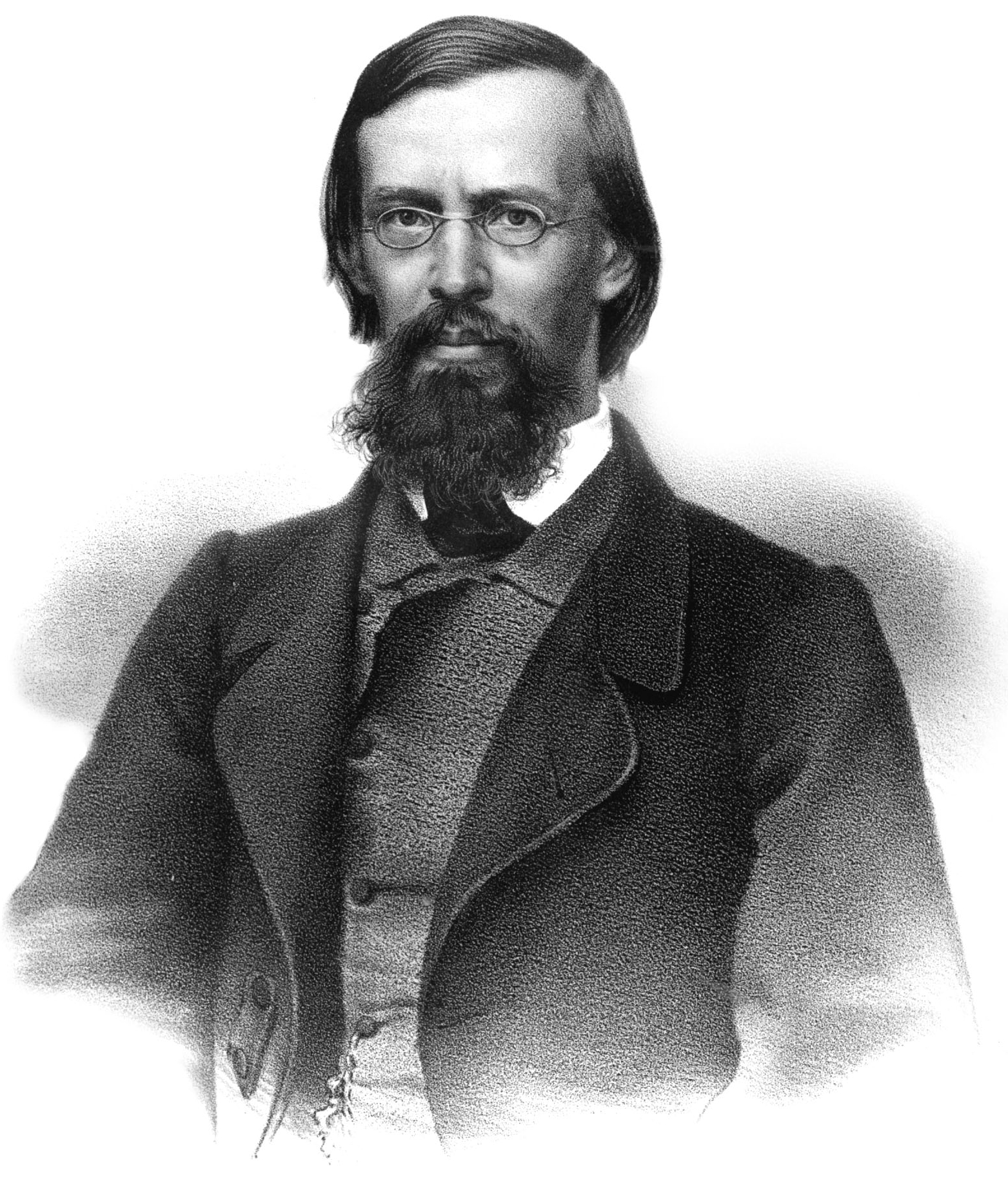
Maykov in 1868

D. S. Mirsky called Maykov "the most representative poet of the age," but added: "Maykov was mildly 'poetical' and mildly realistic; mildly tendentious, and never emotional. Images are always the principal thing in his poems. Some of them (always subject to the restriction that he had no style and no diction) are happy discoveries, like the short and very well known poems on spring and rain. But his more realistic poems are spoiled by sentimentality, and his more 'poetic' poems hopelessly inadequate — their beauty is mere mid-Victorian tinsel. Few of his more ambitious attempts are successful."

By the mid-1850s Maykov had acquired the reputation of a typical proponent of the "pure poetry" doctrine, although his position was special. Yet, according to Pryima, "Maykov was devoid of snobbishness and never saw himself occupying some loftier position even when mentioning 'crowds'. His need in communicating with people is always obvious ("Summer Rain", "Haymaking", "Nights of Mowing", The Naples Album). It's just that he failed to realize his potential as a 'people's poet' to the full." "Maykov couldn't be seen as equal to giants like Pushkin, Lermontov, Koltsov, or Nekrasov," but still "occupies a highly important place in the history of Russian poetry" which he greatly enriched, the critic insisted.

In the years of Maykov's debut, according to Pryima, "Russian poetry was still in its infancy... so even as an enlightener, Maykov with his encyclopedic knowledge of history and the way of approaching every new theme as a field for scientific research played an unparalleled role in the Russian literature of the time." "His spectacular forays into the 'anthological' genre, as well as his translations of classics formed a kind of "antique Gulf Stream" which warmed up the whole of Russian literature, speeding its development," another researcher, F. F. Zelinsky, agreed. Maykov's best poems ("To a Young Lady", "Haymaking", "Fishing", "The Wanderer"), as well his as translations of the Slavic and Western poets and his poetic rendition of Slovo o Polku Igoreve, belong to the Russian poetry classics, according to Pryima.

== Selected bibliography ==
=== Poetry collections ===
- Poems by A.N.Maykov (1842)
- Sketches of Rome (Otcherki Rima, 1847)
- 1854. Poems (Stikhotvoreniya, 1854)
- The Naples Album (Neapolsky albom, 1858)
- Songs of Modern Greece (Pesni novoy Gretsii, 1860)

=== Dramas ===
- Three Deaths (Tri smerti, 1857)
- Two Worlds (Dva mira, 1882)

=== Major poems ===
- Two Fates (Dve sudby, 1845)
- Mashenka (1946)
- Dreams (Sny, 1858)
- The Wanderer (Strannik, 1867)
- Princess*** (Knyazhna, 1878)
- Bringilda (1888)
