= Benediktov (surname) =

Benediktov (Russian: Бенедиктов) is a Russian-origin surname. Persons with that name include:

- Ivan Benediktov (1902–1983), Soviet politician
- Vladimir Benediktov (1807–1873), Russian writer
