= Dobrolyubov =

Dobrolyubov (Russian: Добролюбов) is a Russian masculine surname, its feminine counterpart is Dobrolyubova. It may refer to

- Aleksandr Dobrolyubov (writer) (1876–1945), Russian Symbolist poet
- Aleksandr Dobrolyubov (footballer) (born 1983), Russian footballer and football referee
- Nikolay Dobrolyubov (1836–1861), Russian literary critic, journalist, poet and revolutionary democrat

== See also ==
- Dobrolyubov Street (Yekaterinburg)
