= Princes (disambiguation) =

Princes is the plural for prince, a royal title.

Princes or Prince's or variant, may also refer to:

== Places ==
- Prince's (ward), an administrative division of the London Borough of Lambeth, England
- Princes Town, Trinidad

=== Roads ===
- Princes Highway, a major road in Australia
- Princes Motorway, New South Wales, Australia
- Princes Freeway, Victoria, Australia
- Princes Street, a major thoroughfare in central Edinburgh, Scotland
- Princes Street, Dunedin, New Zealand

=== Facilities and structures ===
- Princes Park (disambiguation)
- Princes Bridge (disambiguation)
- Prince's Building, an office tower and shopping centre in Hong Kong
- Prince's Theatre, a former name of Shaftesbury Theatre, a London West End theatre
- Prince's Dock, Liverpool, part of the Port of Liverpool, England

== Groups, organizations, companies ==
- Princes Group, a food manufacturing company based in the United Kingdom
- Princes Ice Hockey Club, an early European ice hockey teams, sometimes considered the first ice hockey club in Britain
- Prince Alfred College, a private boys school in Kent Town, South Australia, also known as Princes

== Music ==
- Die Prinzen, a German band whose name translate to The Princes
- The Princes (Estonian band), an Estonian rock band

== Other uses ==
- Princes (novel) (1997), by Australian novelist Sonya Hartnett

== See also ==
- Princess (disambiguation)
- Prince (disambiguation)
