= Two Worlds (drama) =

- Author: Apollon Maykov
- Original title: Два мира [Dva mira]
- Language: Russian
- Subject: The conflict between Paganism and Christianity
- Genre: tragedy
- Publication date: 1882
- Publication place: Russian Empire

Two Worlds (Dva Mira, Два ми′ра) is a tragedy in verse by Apollon Maykov first published (in its full form) in February 1882 issue of The Russian Messenger. It represents the final part of the poetic cycle dealing with the conflict between paganism and Christianity. In 1882 Two Worlds won its author the Pushkin Prize for literature and was hailed as his most prominent work to date.

== History ==
After the 1857 publication of Three Deaths Maykov continued to investigate the moral and the ethical aspects of the original clash between Ancient Rome and early Christianity. In 1863 he published "The Death of Lucius" (originally conceived as the second part of Three Deaths), but was dissatisfied with the result. The piece called "Death of Lucius. Part 2" (the manuscript of which was discovered in Maykov's archives years later) proved to be the basis of the Two Worlds. "The Death of Lucius", radically re-worked, has found its way into it too, first as the second (in 1872) and then as the third part, in 1882, when it was published by The Russian Messenger and received the prestigious Pushkin Prize.

== Reception ==
The Two Worlds was widely discussed and favourably reviewed by contemporary critics. Most of them agreed that with it the poet reached his artistic peak. "The poem of Maykov is so maturely conceived and meticulously executed, that we have to regard it as one of those gains our literature should be very proud of," Yakov Grot declared on 19 October 1982, speaking at the Russian Academy of Sciences meeting.
