= Mars Princess =

Mars Princess, Martian Princess, or Princess of Mars may refer to:

- A Princess of Mars, a 1912 novel by Edgar Rice Burroughs, part of the Barsoom series
  - Princess of Mars, a 2009 American film based on the novel
  - Dejah Thoris, a fictional character in the novel series, featured as a princess of Mars
- Aelita (novel), a 1923 novel by Aleksey Tolstoy, featuring the titular character as the princess of Mars
  - Aelita, a 1924 Soviet film based on the novel, featuring the titular character as the queen of Mars
- Sailor Mars, also known as Princess Mars, a character in the manga series Sailor Moon

== See also ==
- Mars (disambiguation)
- Princess (disambiguation)
