= Three Deaths (drama) =

- Author: Apollon Maykov
- Original title: Три смерти
- Language: Russian
- Subject: Philosophy of death in the Ancient Rome
- Genre: lyrical drama
- Publication date: 1857
- Publication place: Russian Empire

Three Deaths (Russian: Три смерти, romanized: Tri smerti) is a lyric drama by Apollon Maykov. Its original version, called "The Choice of Death", finished in 1851, had problems with censorship and was first published, severely cut, under the title Three Deaths in 1857, in the October (No.10) issue of Biblioteka Dlya Chtenyia. The final version of it appeared in the Complete A.N. Maykov (1893).

== Background ==
Three Deaths belongs to the series of Maykov's poems dealing with the history of early Christianity and its conflict with the ancient cultures of Ancient Greece and Rome. The idea, originated in the late 1830s, was first implemented in the 1841 poem "Olynthus and Esther", subtitled: "The Scenes of Rome of the 5th century AD". In the preface to Three Deaths Maykov explained that he wanted to "show the antagonism of the two ideas" that clashed in the late Roman Empire and "just couldn't co-exist peacefully... Sensuality and spirituality, the outer and the inner life emerged as enemies, in direct opposition to each other and were doomed to fight a deadly battle." Vissarion Belinsky disliked the poem but suggested some constructive criticism.

Before setting out to work upon the poem, Maykov had done a lot of research. "It took a long time for me to write The Three Deaths, the play came out of studying the philosophical ideas [of the time]. In fact, I started upon it several times, trying to improve one character or the other, depending which school of thought I was under the influence of, the Epicureanism or the Stoicism," he wrote in his 1850 autobiographical notes.

== History ==
In the preface for the original version Maykov wrote: "The play centers upon the three different views upon the meaning of life, belonging to the people of the [doomed] ancient world... My objective was to represent the general character of this particular epoch, and create human characters... I might have been negligent in terms of factual correctness, but those looking for strict history should apply for Tacitus, not my play, for the latter is but a poetic representation of the spirit of the epoch."

The drama was finished in 1851. Its first version, titled "Choice of Death", was much more radical than the final one, which was published in 1893. At the time it could be neither published nor produced by the Imperial Theatres, and circulated in hand-written versions, praised by many as a strong artistic statement for individual freedoms in general and freedom of speech in particular.

In December 1854 an amateur production of the play was presented in the house of the architect A.Stackensheider, featuring Maykov as Seneca, Vladimir Benediktov as Lucan and the art teacher N.O. Osipov as Lucius. The play, under the title Three Deaths, was first published in the October 1857 issue of Biblioteka Dlya Chtenya.

== Reception ==
"Maykov has written a superb poem called Choice of Death which is something unheard of in the modern history of our poetry," wrote Pyotr Pletnyov to Yakov Grot on September 29, 1851. In an October 31 letter he continued: "Maykov recited both of his new poems at my place, one being Choice of Death, another "Savonarola"... Alas, the publication of [the former] now is out of the question: our censorship behaves like a boa constrictor rushing instinctively to strangle all things still breathing." "There is no hope of seeing the new Maykov's poems in print, even if there is nothing in them but the fine poetical truth," Pletnyov wrote to Mikhail Pogodin on November 19. "It is nice to think and hard to believe that our times can still produce such works as A Family Affair and Choice of Death", wrote Grigory Danilevsky to Pogodin on December 26, 1851.

"With immense pleasure did I read... the greatest poetic work of our times, and I am now awaiting for the Complete Works of our not only the best, but the only 'objective' poet," wrote the publicist Pyotr Lavrov in the November 27, 1857, letter to Maykov after Three Deaths had finally appeared in the October 1857 issue of Biblioteka Dlya Chtenya.

"In Three Deaths we see the peak of the whole Maykov's career," wrote in 1859 liberal critic Alexander Druzhinin. Dmitry Pisarev called Three Deaths one of Maykov's best poems. It was praised by Maxim Gorky who recommended it for the inclusion into the Anthology of the Russian Poetry published by the Grzhebin Publishing house.
