= The Princess =

The Princess may refer to:

== Literature and drama ==
- The Princess (Tennyson poem), an 1847 poem by Alfred, Lord Tennyson
- The Princess (Maykov poem), an 1878 poem by Maykov
- The Princess (Killigrew play), a play by Thomas Killigrew, premiered in 1638
- The Princess (Gilbert play), a musical play by W. S. Gilbert, premiered in 1870, based on the Tennyson poem
- "The Princess" (Lawrence short story), a 1924 story by D. H. Lawrence
- "The Princess", an 1877 short story by Anton Chekhov

== Films ==
- The Princess (1966 film), a 1966 Swedish film
- The Princess (1983 film) (Adj király katonát!), a 1983 Hungarian film directed by Pal Erdöss
- The Princess (2022 action film), a 2022 American fantasy action film
- The Princess (2022 documentary film), a 2022 documentary film about Princess Diana

== Sports ==
- The Princess (golf), a golf tournament on the European Challenge Tour, held in Sweden

== See also ==
- Princess (disambiguation)
