= Dutch Reformed Church, Heidelberg, Gauteng =

Church in Heidelberg, Gauteng, South Africa

Dutch Reformed Church
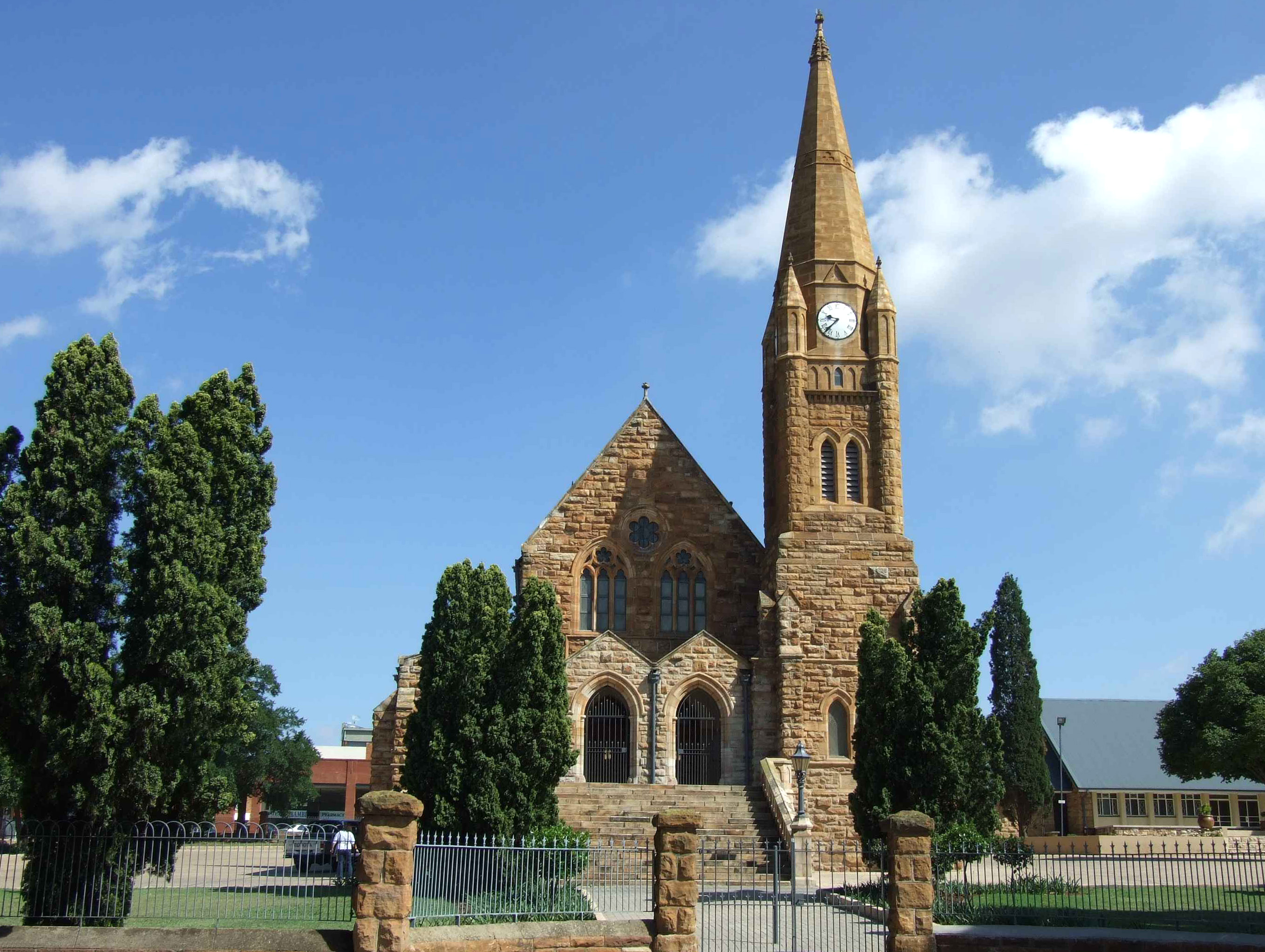
- Location: Heidelberg, Gauteng (Sedibeng District Municipality)
- Country: South Africa
- Denomination: Nederduits Gereformeerde Kerk

History
- Founded: 1865

Architecture
- Functional status: Church

The Dutch Reformed Church in Heidelberg, Gauteng, also known as the Klipkerk, is a congregation of the Dutch Reformed Church in the town of Heidelberg, Gauteng, which until around 1994 was known as Heidelberg, Transvaal, to distinguish it from the Western Cape congregation of the same name.

== Foundation ==
The NG congregation Heidelberg was founded on 27 June 1865. Already at the end of that year the church building could be consecrated. In 1891 the existing elegant and outstanding building was consecrated and occupied by the congregation. The old church was demolished and the material was used to build the rectory in Van der Westhuizen Street. Apparently the construction work on the church tower was not to our liking, because due to a particularly wet rainy season in 1909, this structure collapsed during the busy catechism week, when many members were camping around the church. This was after Rev. Atite Louw and a few church council members had climbed into the tower a few hours earlier to investigate. By grace this happened during lunchtime when no one was nearby, and the tower fell away from the church so that the main building was not damaged. The impact could be clearly heard two blocks away, including the rectory in Van der Westhuizen Street, so that Rev. Louw remarked at the table: "There the tower falls." In 1911 the rebuilt tower was consecrated with Rev. J. D. Kestell of Ficksburg officiating the consecration service.

On 18 July 1867, Rev. Nicolaas van Warmelo was confirmed as the first pastor of the Reformed congregation and in 1885 he joined the union between the NH and NG Church and became pastor of the NH or G congregation in Heidelberg. He was succeeded in 1893 by the unforgettable Rev. Attie Louw, who worked here with blessing for 39 years and left an indelible mark. After him, Rev. Petrus Viljoen stood here from 1932 to 1951. In 1951, Rev. Arnold Meiring accepted the ministry.

== Ministers ==
- Johannes Petrus Wouter de Vries, 1930–1935
- Philippus Jacobus Viljoen, 1932–1951 (accepts his emeritus position)
- Alfred Edward Faul Bosman, 1943–1947 and 1952 – 1 October 1978 (accepts his emeritus position)
