= Heidelberg, Gauteng =

Heidelberg
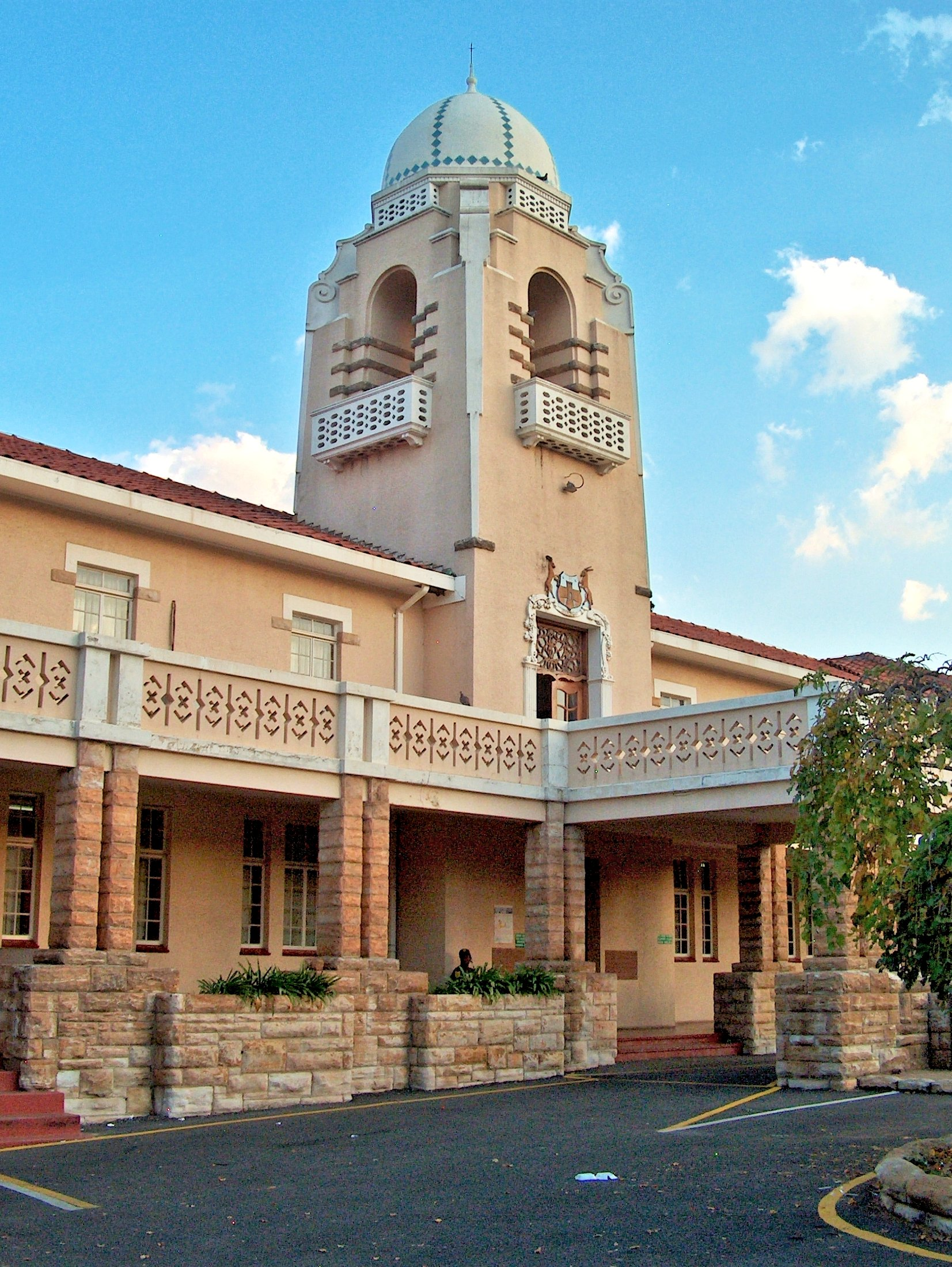
- Heidelberg Town Hall

- Location within Gauteng Location within South Africa Location within Africa
- Coordinates: 26°30′02″S 28°21′30″E
- Country: South Africa
- Province: Gauteng
- District: Sedibeng
- Municipality: Lesedi
- Established: 1886

Area
  - Total: 40.26 km^{2} (15.54 sq mi)

Population (2011)
  - Total: 35,563
  - Density: 883.3/km^{2} (2,288/sq mi)

Racial makeup (2011)
  - Black African: 56.8%
  - Coloured: 1.8%
  - Indian/Asian: 3.2%
  - White: 37.3%
  - Other: 1.0%

First languages (2011)
  - Afrikaans: 37.6%
  - Zulu: 25.0%
  - Sotho: 18.4%
  - English: 8.6%
  - Other: 10.4%
- Time zone: UTC+2 (SAST)
- Postal code (street): 1441
- PO box: 1438
- Area code: 016

Heidelberg is a town with 35,500 inhabitants in the Gauteng province of South Africa, some 50 kilometres south-east of Johannesburg, close to the Mpumalanga border. It sits at the eastern end of the Suikerbosrand Nature Reserve, next to the N3 highway connecting Johannesburg and Durban.

== History ==
The area was once the kraal of the Bakwena, until colonization and the Basotho wars.

Modern Heidelberg was founded in 1862 as a trading station by a German, Heinrich Julius Ueckermann. A town was laid out around the store and named after Ueckermann's alma mater. In 1866, the District of Heidelberg was created from the eastern portion of the Potchefstroom district with its own landdrost (magistrate), having been laid out as a churchplace in 1865.

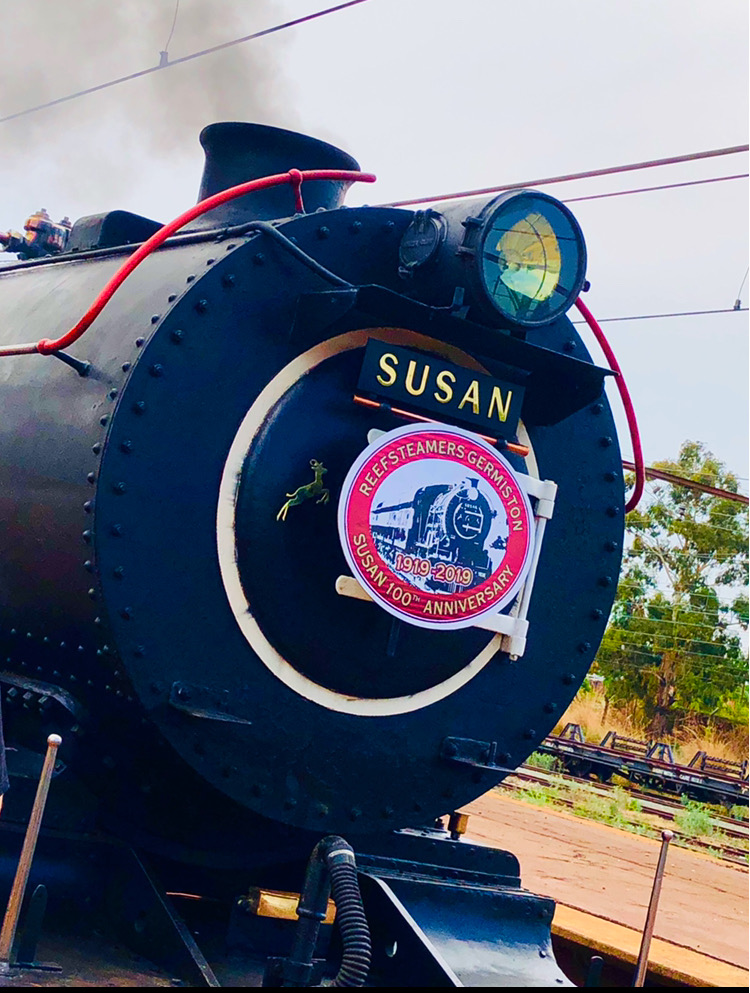
100th anniversary of Susan, a class 12AR locomotive built in 1919 to work on the coal mines

Heidelberg has played an important part in South African history, acting as a capital for the Boer republic during the war with Great Britain under the Triumvirate of Paul Kruger, P.J. Joubert and M.W. Pretorius, from 1880 to 1883. In 1885, the Witwatersrand gold reef was discovered, and the office of the Mining Commissioner was established there.

Heidelberg developed as a typical rural Victorian town. Many buildings dating back to the period between 1890 and 1910 have been preserved, including the home of A.G. Visser, a well-loved medical doctor and famous Afrikaans poet, which can still be seen situated close to the main road through town. Other historical landmarks in the town includes Visser's bust and the Klipkerk. The British built a concentration camp here during the Second Boer War to house Boer women and children; a monument to their memory, and to those of the black women and children who also died during the war, was erected in the main cemetery in the late 1990s by the current ANC-led municipality.

The far right secessionist political organisation (and former paramilitary group) the Afrikaner Weerstandsbeweging (AWB) was founded by the late white supremacist and white separatist leader Eugène Terre'Blanche in the Heidelberg suburb of Rensburg. Its headquarters are now in Terre'Blanche's hometown of Ventersdorp.

The "Jo'burg to Sea" mountain bike stage race starts in Heidelberg. The "Outdoor X" show is held just outside Heidelberg on the Malonjeni Guest Farm.

== Notable people ==
- George Ballot (born 1968 -2023), actor
- Fanie de Villiers (born 1964), Protea bowler
- PG du Plessis(1934-2017), writer
- Zack du Plessis (1950–2011), actor
- Rhyno Hatting, actor
- Prince Hlela (born 1984), footballer
- Johannes le Roux (1920–1944), RAF World War II flying ace
- Godfrey Mokoena (born 1985), 2008 Olympic silver medalist in long jump
- Ockie Oosthuizen (1955–2019), Springbok prop
- Emma Renzi (born 1926), opera singer
