= Two Fates =

- Author: Apollon Maykov
- Original title: Две судьбы [Dve Sudby]
- Language: Russian
- Subject: A 'superfluous' man of the 1840s
- Genre: Narrative poem
- Publication date: 1845
- Publication place: Russia

Two Fates (Dve Sudby) is a poem by Apollon Maykov, first published in 1845 in Saint Petersburg, as a separate edition, under the title "Two Fates. A Real Story by A.N.Maykov" and with considerable censorship cuts. It hasn't been re-issued in the author's lifetime and first appeared in its original form in The Selected Works by A.N.Maykov.

The poem was written in 1844 and deals with the then popular issue of a "superfluous man" of the 1840s. Scholars usually see it as the author's reaction to Vissarion Belinsky's ideas and his own interpretation of them. More obvious influence, though, was Pushkin, and the motivation of the protagonist Vladimir's wanderings looked very much like that formulated in the poem The Prisoner of the Caucasus ("High society reject, a nature's friend / He left his native place..."). Vladimir, who feels as an outcast to the society, is engaged in a feud between Westernizers and Slavophiles (for whom "a local cucumber is sweeter than grapevine"), then succumbs to the blows of fate and turns into a typical landowner, a "mindless 'sky-smoker'".

For all that, according to the biographer Fyodor Pryima, "Two Fates is in many ways an original work, noted, if not for its artistic maturity, then with daring political verve, containing ideas which were akin to those the Decemberists had as regarding the Russian history."

Of the poem's main character, Maykov wrote in a letter to Pavel Viskovatov: "Vladimir is so ambivalent: some of his views are pro-Russian, akin to those expressed by Moskvityanin, which I share myself, others smack of Belinsky-inspired Westernizing... He is a Pechorin-type hero, but of the University kind, and full of Belinsky's ideas." Later Maykov changed both his political views and his opinion of the Two Fates. "All of it, except maybe for two or three lyrical fragments, is phony; the play as such is exceptionally bad", he wrote.

== Reception ==
Contemporary critics lauded the poem for its relevance, depth and realistic characters. In his February 1845 review of Two Fates Belinsky wrote: "This talent that has given us such hopes, develops and progresses. The proof of that is his new poem, richly poetic, fine in its intelligence and multifacetious in terms of motifs and colours."

Alexander Herzen wrote in his diary on March 17, 1845: "Two Fates, by Maykov. Lots of fine moments. He seemed to touch so many strings that vibrate in our soul so achingly! Reflected in it are our estrangement from Europe with its interests, our apathy back home, etc, etc."

Nikolay Chernyshevsky wrote in a letter to Alexander Pypin: "What is remarkable in Two Fates is [its author's] passionate love for our homeland and for science. His speculations as to the reasons for our mental apathy could be as well dismissed but there are wonderful fragments on science in this book."
