= Arthur Prince =

Arthur Prince may refer to,

- Arthur Prince (footballer) (1902–1980), British footballer
- Arthur Prince (ventriloquist) (1881–1948), British ventriloquist
- Arthur Prince, a character played by Paul Stanton in the 1940 film And One Was Beautiful
