= The Wanderer (Maykov poem) =

- Author: Apollon Maykov
- Original title: Странник
- Language: Russian
- Genre: Poem
- Publication date: 1867
- Publication place: Russia
- Media type: Print (hardback & paperback)

The Wanderer (Strannik, Стра́нник) is a poem about a Russian wanderer, by Apollon Maykov, first published in the No.1, January 1867 issue of The Russian Messenger. It was dedicated to Fyodor Tyutchev and subtitled: "First part of the drama The Thirsty One".

== History ==
In his commentaries to the first, magazine version of the poem, Maykov explained:

Beguny (The Runaways) or The Wanderers, or the Sopelsky Agreement (Sopelkovskoye soglasiye), after the Sopelki village where they were based, are all the names for a priestless sect, representing one of the raskol's extreme factions. The wanderer has to leave behind everything that he’s ever owned, sever all of his social and family ties so as to start living "as a Christ's man".

In the same commentaries, the author mentioned several of the sources he used: The Historical Sketches of Russian Priesthood by Pavel Melnikov (part 1, Moscow, 1864), Stories from the History of the Old Believers by S. Maksimov (St Petersburg, 1861), Songs Collected by P. V. Kireevsky (4th issue, Moscow, 1862), works by the raskol scholar N. I. Subbotin. Working upon the language, he studied Avvakum's literary legacy and some old Russian Bible-based texts.

The plot of the poem (or the Scene, as Maykov has defined it) was based on Melnikov's novel Grisha. Maykov omitted many trivial scenes as well as the episode of his "temptation by romantic passions", but strengthened the final, adding a scene of arson which was absent in Melnikov's novel.

The first reading of "The Wanderer" took place on December 3, 1866, at a Karamzin soirée. The poem was praised by Fyodor Dostoyevsky, who called it Maykov's masterpiece. "I've heard it on many occasions in different houses but still am never tired of hearing it each time discovering in it something new. Everybody's enraptured," he wrote.
