= Sketches of Rome =

Book by Apollon Maykov

- Author: Apollon Maykov
- Original title: Очерки Рима
- Publication date: 1847
- Publication place: Russia
- Media type: Print

Sketches of Rome is Apollon Maykov's second book of poetry, published in 1847.

== History ==
In the late 1842 Maykov went for Western Europe and spent two years abroad, mostly in Rome. The result of this visit was the collection of poems published as a separate edition in 1847. Sketches of Rome, according to the modern biographer E.Mayorova, were highly important for Maykov's development as it demonstrated the enriched linguistic palette and opened for him some new artistic possibilities.

The idea of Sketches of Rome has been to some extent prompted by Nikolai Gogol's novelet Rome, published by Moskvityanin in 1842, which rather upset Belinsky with its 'slavophiliac' tendency "to look awry at Paris and myopically at Rome," as he put it.

In Sketches of Rome Maykov created the gallery of citizens of the ancient city, each expressing one feature of the national character or another, much in the tradition of Russian "natural school" movement. The modern Rome here comes across as a healthy alternative to the 'capitalist' Paris, torn by conflicts and scandals. Like the young Prince in Gogol's novel, Maykov's character sympathizes with the classical Rome, its pictures of nature as well as the people reminding him the images from poems of Hellas. The better half of this second book amounts to (according to the biographer Fyodor Pryima) the ruminations over the ruins of Rome ("Games", "Ancient Rome", "Upon Visiting the Vatican Museum", "Campagna di Roma" and others).

One poem of the book, "Palazzo", mentioning 'stolen freedom', had problems with censorship. Another vaguely political piece, "Anachoret" (1846), has its hero envisaging the times when "the poor will tear off their shackles" and "some evil crook won't be honoured like he was God", but returning after 20 years spent in the desert finds the world not changed for the better.

== Criticism ==
The biographer Fyodor Pryima, writing of the author's second collection, opined: "When trying to portray modern life Maykov lacks dynamics and expressiveness... His "Girls from Albano by the Fountain" represents a sketch by a painter who sees the life of contemporary Italy as if through the prism of the classic art. The author not only doesn't try to conceal the fact that his impressions are secondary, he emphasizes this by introducing to the picture first the German artist who actually paints these girls, and then himself, a Russian poet dreaming of making a verbal sketch of the same." In many instances, according to Priyma, Maykov's view is static and often self-effacing.
