= Prinz =

Prinz is a German title that translates into English as "prince", see also Fürst (sovereign prince).

Prinz may also refer to:

- Prinz (brand), a brand formerly used by the British photographic and electronics retail chain, Dixons
- NSU Prinz, automobile produced in West Germany by NSU Motorenwerke AG from 1957 to 1973
- Prinz (crater), an impact crater on the Moon

== People ==
- Alfred Prinz (1930–2014), Austrian composer
- Birgit Prinz (born 1977), German retired footballer
- Bret Prinz (born 1977), American baseball player
- Dietrich Prinz (1903–1989), German computer scientist
- Günter Prinz, German editor-in-chief of Bild
- Jesse Prinz, American professor
- Joachim Prinz (1902–1988), American-German rabbi
- LeRoy Prinz (1895–1983), American choreographer
- Matthias Prinz (born 1956), German lawyer
- Nina Prinz (born 1982), German motorcycle racer
- Renate Prinz (born 1929), German-British architect
- Rosemary Prinz (born 1930), American television actress
- Thomas Prinz (born 1959), German ambassador
- Wolfgang Prinz (born 1942), German psychologist
- Kim Prinz (born 1966), German -Canadian journalist

== See also ==
- Prince (disambiguation)
- Prinze (surname)
