= John Prince =

John Prince may refer to:

- John Prince (politician) (1796–1870), Canadian judge and politician
- John Prince (biographer) (1643–1723), Devonshire vicar and biographer
- John Prince (cricketer) (born 1969), Saint Lucian cricketer.
- John Prince (croquet player) (1945–2023), New Zealand croquet player
- John Prince (Unitarian) (1751–1836), see History of Unitarianism
- John Prince (architect), see Buntingsdale Hall
- John Critchley Prince (1808–1866), English poet
- John Dyneley Prince (1868–1945), American linguist, diplomat and politician
- John E. Prince (1868-1947), American politician
- John T. Prince (1871–1937), American actor
- John Henry Prince (born 1914), American baseball player
- Jack Prince (footballer), English footballer

== See also ==
- Prince John (disambiguation)
