= Princesse =

Princesse (French 'princess') may refer to:

- "Princesse", single hit for Julie Zenatti
- Princesse (Nekfeu song)
- La Princesse 15-metre (50-foot) mechanical spider designed and operated by French performance art company La Machine.

== See also ==
- Princess (disambiguation)
