= Prinze =

Prinze is a surname. Notable people with the surname include:

- Freddie Prinze (1954-1977), American stand-up comedian
- Freddie Prinze, Jr. (born 1976), American actor
- Sarah Michelle Gellar Prinze (born 1977), American actress

== See also ==
- Prinz (disambiguation)
- Prince (disambiguation)
