= Prince (given name) =

- Pronunciation: /prɪns/
- Gender: Male

Origin
- Word/name: Anglo-Saxon itself derived from Latin
- Meaning: prince

Prince is a masculine given name.

== Etymology ==
Prince as a given name is an Anglo-Saxon name, derived from the Latin word princeps (“first one” or “leader”).

The name comes from its first bearer, who was a person who acted in a formal and regal manner, or who had won the title of prince in some sort of contest.

== Artists and entertainers ==
=== Musicians ===
- Prince (musician) (1958–2016), American singer-songwriter born Prince Rogers Nelson
- Prince Adekunle (1942–2017), Nigerian musician
- Prince Bright, Ghanaian musician
- Prince Eke (born 1981), Nigerian actor
- Prince Harvey, American rapper
- Prince McCoy (1882–1968), American singer
- Prince Kudakwashe Musarurwa (born 1988), Zimbabwean musician
- Prince Udaya Priyantha (1970–2017), Sinhalese singer
- Prince Robinson (1902–1960), American saxophone player

=== Other artists and entertainers ===
- Prince Abdi (born 1982), British comedian
- Prince Amponsah (actor), Canadian actor
- Prince Bagdasarian (born 1984), American film director
- Prince Cecil (born 1993), Indian actor
- Prince Demah (c. 1745–1778), American painter
- Prince Eke (born 1977), Nigerian actor
- Prince Gomolvilas (born 1972), American playwright
- Prince Gyasi (born 1995), Ghanaian visual artist
- Prince Hoare (elder) (1711–1769), sculptor
- Prince Hoare (younger) (1755–1834), painter and playwright
- Prince Narula (born 1990), Indian actor and model
- Prince Randian (1871–1934), Guyanese-born American sideshow performer

== Athletes ==
=== Association footballers ===
- Prince Obus Aggreh (born 1996), Nigerian footballer
- Prince Agyemang (born 1994), Ghanaian footballer
- Prince Amanda (born 2001), Tanzanian footballer
- Prince Koranteng Amoako (born 1973), Ghanaian footballer
- Prince Amponsah (footballer) (born 1996), Ghanaian footballer
- Prince Asubonteng (born 1986), Ghanaian footballer
- Prince Mark Boley (born 1989), Liberian footballer
- Prince Bonkat (born 1996), Nigerian footballer
- Prince Buaben (born 1988), Ghanaian footballer
- Prince Daye (born 1978), Liberian footballer
- Prince Dube (born 1997), Zimbabwean footballer
- Prince Eboagwu (born 1986), Nigerian footballer
- Prince Efe Ehiorobo (born 1983), Nigerian footballer
- Prince Ikpe Ekong (born 1978), Nigerian footballer
- Prince Gyimah (born 1990), Ghanaian footballer
- Prince Hlela (born 1984), South African footballer
- Prince Ibara (born 1996), Congolese international footballer
- Prince Ihekwoaba (born 1989), Nigerian footballer
- Prince Mumba (footballer) (born 2001) Zambian footballer
- Prince Nana (footballer), Ghanaian former footballer
- Prince Ngaah (born 2003), Equatoguinean footballer
- Prince Nnake (born 1989), Nigerian footballer
- Prince Olomu (born 1986), Nigerian footballer
- Prince Oniangué (born 1988), French footballer
- Prince Owusu (footballer, born January 1997), German footballer
- Prince Owusu (footballer, born February 1997), Ghanaian footballer

=== Gridiron/American football players ===
- Prince Amukamara (born 1989), American cornerback
- Prince Emili (born 1998), American football player
- Prince Charles Iworah (born 1993), American cornerback
- Prince McJunkins (1960–2021), American quarterback
- Prince Miller (born 1988), American cornerback
- Prince Tega Wanogho (born 1997), American football player

=== Boxers ===
- Prince Badi Ajamu (born 1972), American boxer
- Prince Amartey (born 1944), Ghanaian boxer
- Prince Arron (born 1987), English boxer

=== Other athletes ===
- Prince Amara (born 1973), Sierra Leonean sprinter
- Prince Bartholomew (1939–2017), Trinidad cricketer
- Prince Caperal (born 1993), Filipino basketball player
- Prince Fielder (born 1984), American baseball player
- Prince ǃGaoseb (born 1998), Namibian rugby union player for the Tel Aviv Heat
- Prince Iaukea (born 1964), American professional wrestler
- Prince Ibeh (born 1994), British basketball player
- Prince Mumba (athlete) (born 1984) Zambian middle distance runner
- Prince Nana (born 1979), American professional wrestler

== Politicians ==
- Prince Ahmed Ali Ahmedzai (born 1968), Pakistani politician
- Prince Casinader (1926–2018), Sri Lankan politician and teacher
- Prince Johnson (1952–2024), Liberian warlord and politician
- Prince Gopal Lakshman (1954–2016), Fijian politician
- Prince Hulon Preston Jr. (1908–1961), American politician
- Prince Raj (born 1989), Indian politician

== Other ==
- Prince Julius Adewale Adelusi-Adeluyi (born 1940), Nigerian pharmacist, Minister of Health and Social Services and businessman
- Prince Boston (1750–?), American slave
- Prince Estabrook (1741–1830), American militiaman
- Prince Hall (1735–1807), African-American abolitionist
- Prince Romerson (c. 1840–1872), Hawaiian American Civil War soldier
- Prince E. Rouse (1917–2003), American physical chemist

== See also ==
- Prince
- Prince (surname)
