= Princess Theatre =

Princess Theatre or Princess Theater may refer to:

== In Australia ==
- Princess Theatre (Fremantle), Western Australia
- Princess Theatre (Launceston), Tasmania
- Princess Theatre (Melbourne), Victoria
- Princess Theatre (Sydney), New South Wales (1911–1925)
- Princess Theatre (Woolloongabba), Brisbane (1888–1889)

== In Canada ==
- Princess Theatre (Edmonton), Alberta
- Princess Theatre, Ontario - defunct live theatre

== In the United Kingdom ==
- Princess Theatre, Hunstanton, Norfolk, England
- Princess Theatre (Torquay), Devon, England

== In the United States ==
- Princess Theatre (Bloomington, Indiana), in the National Register of Historic Places listings in Monroe County, Indiana
- Princess Theatre (Decatur, Alabama)
- Princess Theatre (Winnsboro, Louisiana), historic theater in Winnsboro, Louisiana
- Princess Theatre (New York City, 1913–1955)
- Princess Theatre (New York, 29th Street), open from 1875 to 1907, known as the Princess Theatre from 1902 to 1907
- Princess Theatre (New York City, 1980–1984), operating on site of the Latin Quarter nightclub
- Princess Theatre (Portland, Oregon), now known as the Star Theater

== See also ==
- Prince's Theatre
- Princess's Theatre, London, England
- Princess of Wales Theatre, Toronto, Canada
- Prince of Wales Theatre, London, England
- Teatro Princesa, Valencia, Spain
