= Dobrolyubov Street (Yekaterinburg) =

Street in Yekaterinburg, Russia

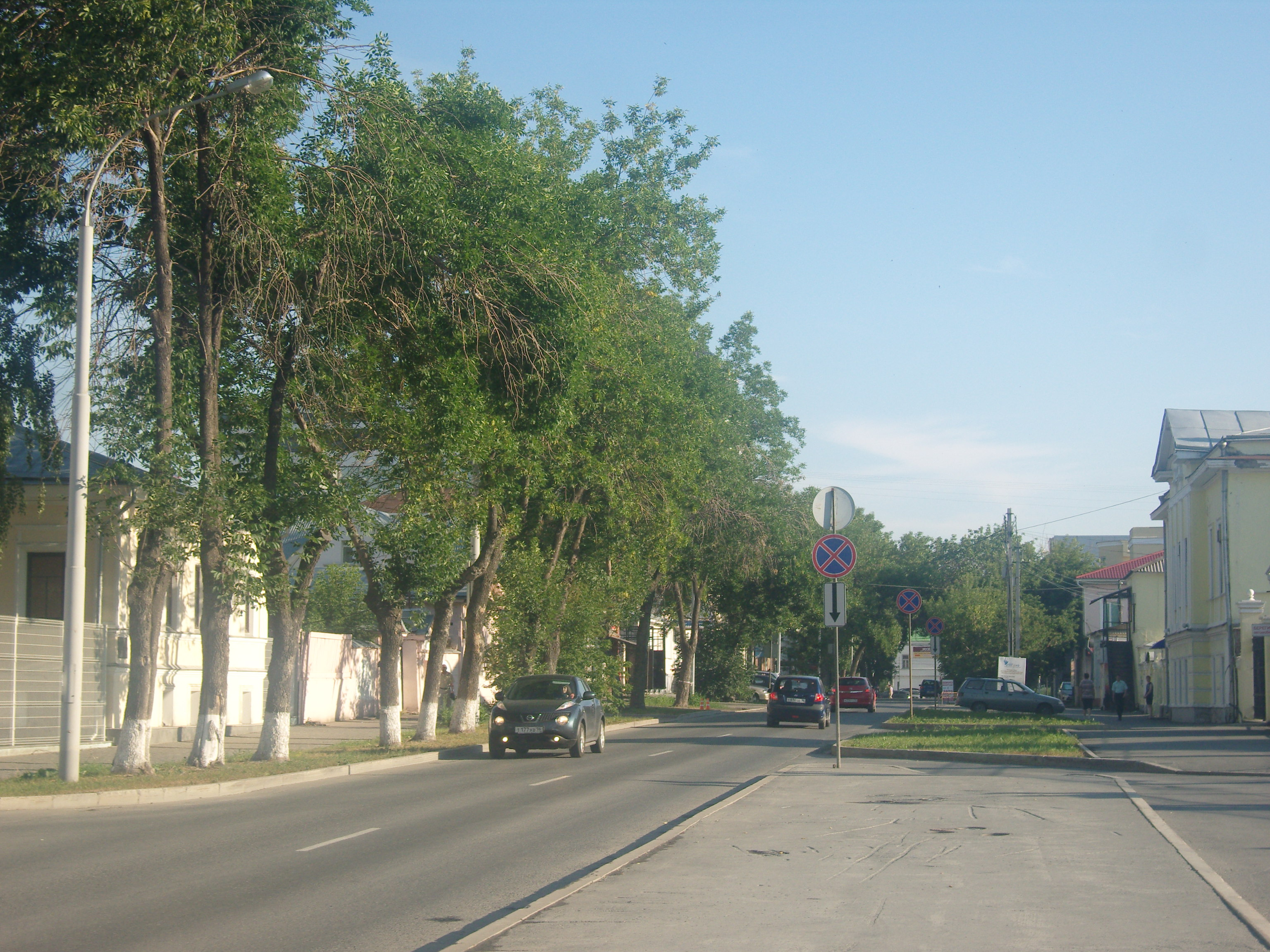
Dobrolyubova Street (Yekaterinburg)

Dobrolyubov Street is one of the oldest streets of Yekaterinburg located on the right bank of the Iset River in the residential area central of the Leninsky administrative region of the city. Dobrolyubov Street appeared practically along with foundation of the city of Yekaterinburg, having become one of the first streets of the Kupetsky settlement — formed at that time a posad behind the southern wall of wooden Ekaterinburg fortress. Till fall of 1919 the street serially replaced a number of names: Avramova, Sapozhnikov, Markov, 3rd Uktusskaya, Otryasikhinsky, Zyryanovsky, Hospital.

== Sovremennaya Street ==
Sovremennaya Street of Dobrolyubov is the silent small central city street, without the heavy car and foot traffic. On it a number of monuments of historical and cultural heritage of the city, administrative agencies, offices, one of exhibition platforms of Sverdlovsk regional museum of local lore is located. In 2010 on the street construction of the residence of the Russian President's Plenipotentiary in the Ural federal district was complete

== Arrangement and improvement ==
Dobrolyubov Street passes from the North to the south between the Iset River bend from the East and Chernyshevsky Street from the West, begins from Malyshev Street and comes to an end at Radishchev Street. With other streets Dobrolyubov Street isn't crossed, adjunctions of other streets are also absent.
