= Arthur Prince (ventriloquist) =

British ventriloquist (1881–1948)

Arthur Prince (17 November 1881 – 14 April 1948) was an English music hall entertainer and ventriloquist.

== Biography ==
Prince was born in 1881 in London. He made his first appearance in Llandrindod Wells, and then joined a beach concert party in which he performed for four seasons.

Prince and his ventriloquist doll ‘Jim’ made their London debut in 1902 at the South London Palace. They went on to appear at all the leading music halls in the United Kingdom, including the first Royal Command Performance at the Palace Theatre in 1912. A world tour followed with their comedy act ‘Naval Occasions’.

Prince is remembered for having his dummy, Sailor Jim, sing while Prince drank a glass of water or smoked a cigar. A singer off stage made this trick possible. This was made more believable because Prince developed a very lifelike dummy.

Prince died at his St John's Wood home on 14 April 1948 and was buried at Hampstead Cemetery. His doll 'Jim' was buried with him.
