= Aleksandr Dobrolyubov =

Russian poet

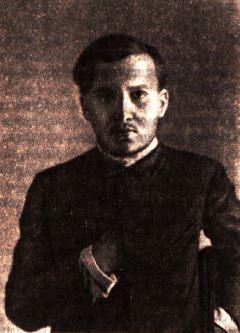
The picture of Alexander Mikhailovich Dobrolyubov

Aleksandr Mikhailovich Dobrolyubov (Russian: Александр Михайлович Добролюбов; 1876 – c. 1945) was a Russian Symbolist poet, well known mostly for his creative energy rather than his poetry.

Dobrolyubov preached his version of Christian spirituality in central Russia, Siberia and Central Asia, during the early years of Soviet Russia. He wrote a book titled From the Invisible Book. He died some time between 1943 and 1945.
