= Matthias Prinz =

German lawyer (born 1956)

Matthias Prinz (born 1956) is a German lawyer who works in the field of reputation and privacy protection, defamation, media, entertainment and sports law. He has represented major corporations, including SAP, Audi, Volkswagen, T-Mobile as well as individuals including the Swedish Royal Family, Princess Caroline of Hanover, The Sultan of Brunei, Prince Albert of Monaco, Helmut Newton, David Beckham, Don Johnson and Karl Lagerfeld.

== Biography ==
His father was German newspaper journalist Günter Prinz, the former CEO of Axel Springer Verlag. Prinz received his LLM from Harvard Law School in 1983 and his JD from Hamburg University in 1985. He has been a member of the New York Bar since 1984. In 1985, he was admitted to the Bar in Hamburg, Germany, where he founded the law firm Prinz Neidhardt Engelschall.

Prinz started a series of litigation against different European media that produced a collection of precedents at the highest German and European Courts over the next 20 years. The cases are known as the Princess-Caroline-decisions in German and European jurisprudence.

Prinz also represented leading German athletes, such as Boris Becker, Michael Stich, Henry Maske, Franziska voan Almsick and especially German soccer clubs of the premier league, their coaches and players, as well as the T-mobile biking team and the German national showjumping team. On behalf of the then world's best soccer goalie Oliver Kahn, Prinz sued EA Sports, the manufacturers of the football computer game FIFA 2002, for using the name and the personality of the goalie without his consent.

Prinz also advises CEOs and Chairmen of German DAX30 companies, such as Porsche, Volkswagen and ThyssenKrupp. Prinz represented the Sultan of Brunei in the preparation of the State Visit of the Sultan to the Federal Republic of Germany and several other heads of state such as the King of Sweden, the Prince of Monaco, the President of Albania as well as German politicians like chancellor Gerhard Schröder, president Walter Scheel and Minister of foreign affairs Hans Dietrich Genscher. Prinz was, as one German paper noted, the first German lawyer ever hired by a foreign Head of State as advisor for a State Visit.

In 2003, Prinz began to represent the Swedish Royal Family against invasion of privacy and defamatory articles in German media. Prinz used preliminary Court orders to force 23 German magazines to print replies, retractions and apologies on their front pages. Claims for damages and injunctions followed, which led to the decision of the Hamburg Court of Appeals to award €400,000,00 (US$538.180,00) damages to Princess Madeleine of Sweden. An appeal of the media company to the Federal Appellate Court was rejected in 2010. This damage award is regarded by the German media as being the highest in German defamation and privacy law ever.

Prinz has written several articles on German media law, privacy protection, litigation PR and media strategies. He is the co-author of Prinz/Peters "Medienrecht", a comprehensive standard text book for German media law. Prinz teaches classes on media law, the protection of privacy and defamation at FU Berlin (Freie Universität Berlin) since 1996.
