= Princes Bridge (disambiguation) =

Princes Bridge may refer to:

- Princes Bridge, over the Barwon River in Victoria, Australia
- Princes Bridge, over the Yarra River in Melbourne, Australia
- Princes Bridge railway station in Melbourne

== See also ==
- The Princess Bride
