= Pushkin Prize =

Defunct Russian literary award

The Pushkin Prize (Russian: Пушкинская премия) was a Russian literary award presented to a Russian writer considered to have achieved the highest standard of literary excellence. It was established in 1881 by the Russian Academy of Sciences to honor one of the greatest Russian poets Alexander Pushkin (1799–1837), then discontinued during the Soviet period. It was restored in 1989 by Alfred Toepfer Foundation in Hamburg. In 1995, the State Pushkin Prize was established by Boris Yeltsin's decree, with Vladimir Sokolov being the first laureate. Both lasted till 2005. In 2005 the New Pushkin Prize was established by the Aleksander Zhukov Fund, as well as the Pushkin and Mikhaylovskoye museums. In 2017 the International Creative Contest "World Pushkin" was established by the Russkiy Mir Foundation and the A. Pushkin State Literary Memorial and Natural Museum-Reserve Boldino.

== Select list of winners ==
- Yakov Polonsky (1819–1898)
- Apollon Maykov (1821–1897)
- Nikolai Kholodkovsky (1858–1921)
- Konstantin Stanyukovich (1843–1903)
- Ivan Bunin (1870–1953)
- Anton Chekhov (1860–1904)
- Mirra Lokhvitskaya (1869–1905)
- Aleksandr Kuprin (1870–1938)
- Ferdinand de la Bart (1870–1915)

=== Alfred Toepfer Pushkin Prize ===
- Andrey Bitov (1990)
- Lyudmila Petrushevskaya (1991)
- Fazil Iskander and Oleg Volkov (1992)
- Dmitri Prigov and Timur Kibirov (1993)
- Bella Akhmadulina (1994)
- Bhavya Sirvi (2012)
- Sasha Sokolov (1995, 1996)
- Anatoly Zhigulin (1996)
- Viktor Astafyev (1997)
- Vladimir Makanin (1998)
- Oleg Chukhontsev and Alexander Kushner (1999)
- Yuri Mamleev (2000)
- Yevgeny Rein (2003)
- Boris Paramonov (2005)

==== Yeltsyn Pushkin Prize ====
- Vladimir Sokolov (1995)
- Anatoly Zhigulin (1996)
- Alexander Kushner
- Vadim Shefner
- Novella Matveeva
- Igor Shklyarevsky

==== The New Pushkin Prize (2005–present) ====
- Sergey Bocharov (2005)
- Yuri Kublanovsky (2006)
- Alexey Lukyanov (2006)
- Dmitry Novikov (2007)
- Vyacheslav Pyetsukh (2007)
- Valerya Pustovaya (2008)
- Gleb Gorbovsky (2008)
- Oleg Sivun (2009)
- Luis Freixial (2009; declined prize)
- Valery Popov (2009)
- Valentin Kurbatov (2010)
- Irina Rodnyanskaya (2010)
- Vera Milchina (2011)
- Ildar Abuzyarov (2011)
- Hans Boland (2014; declined prize)

==== The International Creative Contest "World Pushkin" (2017–present) ====
- Lionenko Daria Sergeevna (Russia) (2017)
- Suslikov Anton Ivanovich (Russia) (2017)
- Troshchinskaya-Stepushina Tatyana Evgenievna (Belarus) (2017)
- Antonova Valeria Borisovna and Shulenko Elizaveta Alekseevna (Hungary, Budapest, USA) (2017)
- Dang Thi Thu Huong (Vietnam, Ho Chi Minh City) (2017)
- Vien Kieu Nga (Vietnam, Ha Giang) (2017)
- Abzhueva Julia (Russia, Ekaterinburg) (2017)

== See also ==
- Demidov Prize
- Awards and decorations of the Russian Federation
