= J. D. Kestell =

John Daniel Kestell (15 February 1854 – 9 February 1941) was a minister in the Dutch Reformed Church, Bible translator, writer and cultural leader. As a writer, he sometimes used the pseudonyms Afrikanus Jr. and Leinad. The latter was his middle name spelled backwards.

== Early life and origins ==
John Daniel Kestell was the fifth of six children. His parents were the Englishman Charles Kestell (born 9 August 1818 in Wales) and the Afrikaner Dorothea Louisa Weyer (26 March 1820 – 2 September 1858), who were married on 31 October 1845 by Daniel Lindley at Pietermaritzburg.On his father's side, he was a direct descendant of a British Settler family who had initially settled in the Albany district and later moved to Grahamstown.

In 1845, John's father came to Natal on the ship Rosebud and settled in Pietermaritzburg, where he joined the Dutch Reformed Church as a strong believer and served as a deacon and elder. His mother died in 1858 when John was four years old. His father's second marriage was on 24 August 1859 to Johanna Susanne van den Berg. John began school with Miss Osborne of St. Andrew's Church and later at the government school in the Voortrekkerkerkie, where W. Nisbett was headmaster. As a child he met many Voortrekkers, including Sarel Cilliers, J.N. Boshoff, Erasmus Smit, Daniel Bezuidenhout and Marthinus Oosthuijse. On 31 March 1869, his father removed him from the government school and placed him in the school of Mr. Muirhead where he received his first lessons in Greek.

He left school in 1870 and began working for P. Maré on 6 October 1870. At this time diamonds were discovered in Griqualand West and on 17 May 1871 he and his father set out for the diamond claims at New Rush, where they earned enough to live on and save a little. They sold the claim a year and a half later and returned to Pietermaritzburg in January 1873.

Kestell continued his studies at the Stellenbosch Gymnasium from March 1873 and boarded in the town with a certain Miss Faure. He completed his matriculation in 1875. During this time, H.F. Schoon and Abraham Kriel were among his fellow students.

== Training and study ==
Early in 1874 he was converted and on 6 February 1874 he recorded in his diary that he had decided to become a minister. After school he enrolled at the Theological Seminary in Stellenbosch where Prof. N.J. Hofmeyr and John Murray were professors. In the meantime his father suffered great financial setbacks with transport to places such as Durban, Pretoria, Middelburg, Tvl., and Bloemfontein. In 1876 he bought oxen on credit to transport a load to Middelburg, but on the way lightning killed most of the oxen. After this he was obliged to let John know that he could no longer help him financially. Abraham van Velden (pastor of Pietermaritzburg from 1868 to 1879 when he had to resign from the ministry due to a "weakness" that became his master) collected £40 from his members to help Kestell, help him take out a loan for further expenses and also to insure his life so that he could continue his studies. During his studies at Stellenbosch, John could not afford to go home and therefore spent holidays with friends. It was not until September 1878 that he was able to go home for the first time in more than five years, after his father had saved enough money to make it happen. He was able to stay there for a month before returning to Stellenbosch.

On 15 December 1877 he became engaged to Geertruida Anna (Truida) Hofmeyr, daughter of Prof. N.J. Hofmeyr. Through his marriage to Truida Hofmeyr, he became the brother-in-law of three NG ministers, the first two of whom were suspended from office, but reinstated decades later: Adriaan Hofmeyr (1854–1934), Jan Hofmeyr (1856–1924), Nicolaas Hofmeyr (1860–1932).

Letter (1881)

Kestell went overseas to Utrecht in the Netherlands in September 1880 to continue his theological studies and studied there under Prof. Nicolaas Beets. He also took private lessons in French and progressed so well that he could speak the language fluently, which together with a thorough knowledge of Greek and Hebrew made him fluent in five languages. In December 1880 he visited England to find a publisher for his drama The struggle for freedom and from London he also visited Paris. In January 1881 he was back in Utrecht to continue his studies, but from the end of March 1881 he undertook an extensive trip through Europe and visited Belgium, Germany, Italy and Switzerland, among others. On 21 March 1881 he was back in Utrecht.

He completed his studies and left for England on 29 May 1881, where he stayed for almost a month before embarking on the return journey to South Africa. In August 1881 he was back in South Africa and completed his studies at the Seminary. He was ordained as a minister in the Dutch Reformed Church in October 1881.

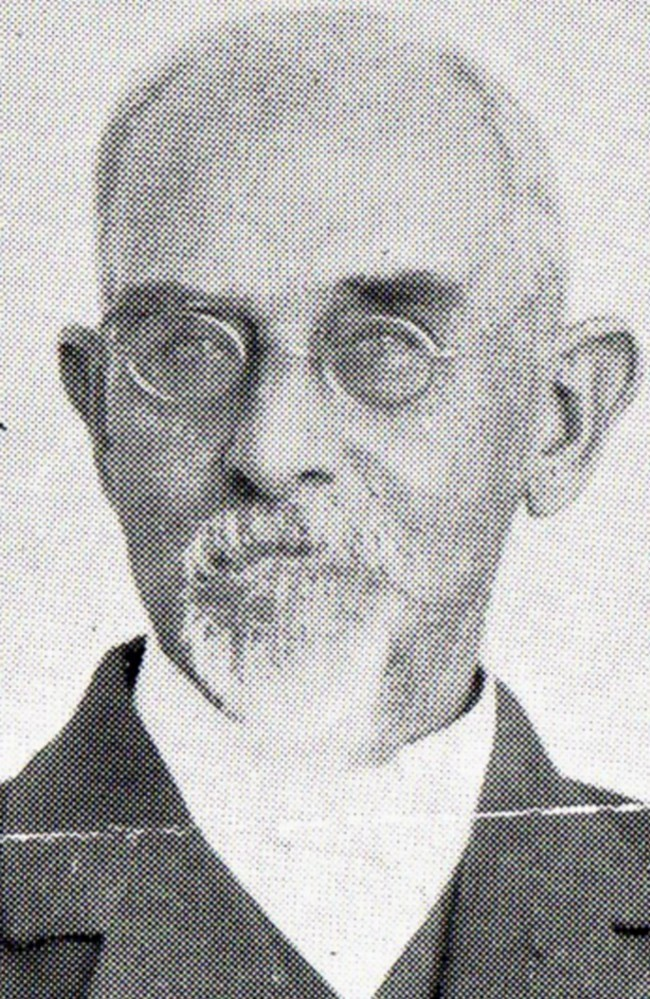
J.D. Kestell

== Entry into the ministry ==
Immediately after his ordination he received a call to the Dutch Reformed congregation of Lindley in the Free State, which he resigned. In 1881 he was confirmed as assistant preacher in the Dutch Reformed congregation of Dutoitspan on the Kimberley diamond fields.

On 28 February 1882, he married Truida Hofmeyr (1858–1946), the second youngest child and only daughter of Prof. Nicolaas Hofmeyr, whose biography was later written by Kestell, in Stellenbosch. He thus had three ministers as brothers-in-law, of whom the two eldest were suspended, but the eldest was reinstated decades later: Adriaan Jacobs Louw Hofmeyr (1854–1934), Jan Hendrik Hofmeyr (1856–1924, also first editor of the Dutch newspaper Ons Land) and Nicolaas Hofmeyr (1860–1932). His fourth brother-in-law was Charles Louis Hofmeyr (1865–1939), lawyer and school inspector in the Cape. Five children were born from their marriage, two sons (Charles and Nicolaas Hofmeyr) and three daughters (Gertruida Anna, Maria Magdalena and Louise Johanna).[1]

He was confirmed as pastor of the nearby NG congregation of Kimberley on 25 March 1882. The plight of the children and women on the excavations so affected him and his wife that they founded the Newton Home to provide assistance. After this, he was called to the NG congregation of Harrismith in 1893 and confirmed there on 12 January 1894. During this time he made regular contributions, including short stories, to the Gereformeerd Maandblad and Ons Tijdschrift.

During the Second War of Independence, Kestell served as chaplain and field preacher of the Harrismith Commando from October 1899 and wrote Met de Boeren commando’s (translated by F.W. Reitz as Through shot and flame), which depicts Reitz’s experiences in the war. His wife and children spent the war with her family in Pietermaritzburg, because the English had forbidden them the parsonage at Harrismith. His fifteen-year-old son, Charles, accompanied his father to the battlefields.

At the Battle of Platrand near Ladysmith on 6 January 1900, Kestell risked his own life by dressing the wounds of wounded men on both sides and quenching their thirst. At the request of the British, a memorial stone was later erected to him at this hill. He became a friend and advisor to Pres. M.T. Steyn and Gen. Christiaan de Wet and these three soon became known as the Driemanskap of the Free State (the statesman, the soldier and the spiritual leader). With his commando, Kestell set out for Nauwpoort and along the Klein Caledon River up and then crisscrossing the Free State plains as they advanced ahead of the English. They met Steyn and De Wet at Korannaberg on 14 November 1900.

On 6 June 1901, the English captured him at Graspan near Reitz and held him in a kraal on the farm with other Boers. However, that same afternoon, they were freed by a number of Boers after a fierce battle. His son Charles was captured in October 1901 and died as a prisoner of war at Ladysmith. On 23 February 1902, the Boer forces were trapped by the English at Kalkkrans near Harrismith, but De Wet's military prowess ensured that Kestell and Steyn and the other Boers achieved a breakthrough. As secretary of the Boer forces, Kestell subsequently played an important role during the peace negotiations and also wrote the official minutes of the negotiations that resulted in the conclusion of peace at Vereeniging.

== Visit to Europe ==
In August 1902, Kestell, along with Gens. De Wet, Koos de la Rey and Louis Botha, left for Europe to raise money for the stricken Boers. On this trip he was De Wet's secretary and he also helped the general with the proofreading and editing of his book of war memories, De Strijd Tusschen Boer en Brit. He accomplished this within three months, while he himself was busy compiling his own war memories and preparing Nico Hofmeyr's (his brother-in-law) manuscript, Zes maanden bij de Commando's, for printing.

== Church service in Ficksburg ==
In February 1903, Kestell was called to the Dutch Reformed congregation of Ficksburg. His confirmation was scheduled for March 7, 1903, and his first meeting was held on March 9 of that year. Already a few months after his confirmation, Kestell was campaigning for the building of a new church in Ficksburg. At the congregation meeting of July 25, 1903, it was decided that a monument in memory of the congregation's fallen would be the form of a new church. This elegant house of worship, of which Kestell was co-architect, was consecrated on April 12, 1907. The decision to build a church was ratified by a congregation meeting and a building committee was elected.

On 23 October 1903 the chairman received a gift to the congregation from Mr and Mrs. J.G. Keyter consisting of a Bible, a Psalm and Hymn Book and a Formulary Book. Keyter was for many years a member of the Volksraad and later a member of the Union Parliament. He was a lawyer and left a sum of £300 000 to the Cape Church Mission. At the meeting of 4 March 1905 mention was made of the establishment of the Dutch Reformed congregation Marquard.

At the meeting of 8 November 1906, a petition was submitted by 97 members of the NG congregation of Ficksburg in which they asked permission to secede from the congregation of Clocolan. On 2 February 1907, the following decision was made: "Since a large organ will be placed in the new church, and a competent organist is needed, the meeting decided to increase the salary to £48 per year." A month later, on 2 March 1907, Mr. G.W. van der Vyver was appointed organist and L.R. Prinsloo was appointed sacristan.

=== Church in Ficksburg ===
The new church of Ficksburg was dedicated on 12 April 1907. An extensive program was performed on the occasion. The proceedings lasted from half past seven on Friday morning until late on Sunday evening. The dedication service was conducted by the 80-year-old Prof. N.J. Hofmeyr, father-in-law of the pastor, and the organ was played by Prof. P.K. le Roux. The children's service was led by Herman van Broekhuizen, son of the congregation's second pastor.

The construction took two years and five months. To get the solid rock for the tower, 13 feet (over 4 m) were sunk below the surface. The cornerstone was laid on May 27, 1905. The wording of a document placed under the stone reads as follows: "To the glory of God, this corner stone of the Dutch Reformed Church in Ficksburg was laid on the twenty-seventh day of May in the year of our Lord, one thousand, nine hundred, five by the local teacher Rev. J.D. Kestell. The Architect of the building to be erected is Mr. Walter Donaldson ... On the 4th of June In 1904, the congregation decided to build a new church, and on November 16, 1904, they began to dig the trenches for the foundations."

The plan submitted to the building commission was to cost £10,000. The plan and specifications were drawn up by the architect Walter Donaldson in consultation with Kestell, who actually conceived the idea of the church in accordance with the Romanesque style of architecture he had studied in books and had also encountered during his European travels as a student. The organ and lights were donated by the sisters. The money needed for the clock and timepiece was collected by the young people. The children provided the pulpit. The rooster on the tower was a gift from a parishioner. The church building was dedicated on 7 April 1907.

Kestell realized during this time of reconstruction that it was essential to educate the people and, together with J.J. Ross, founded the Chautauqua Reading and Study Circle with the goal of “Education, dissemination of knowledge”.

== Bloemfontein and church leader ==
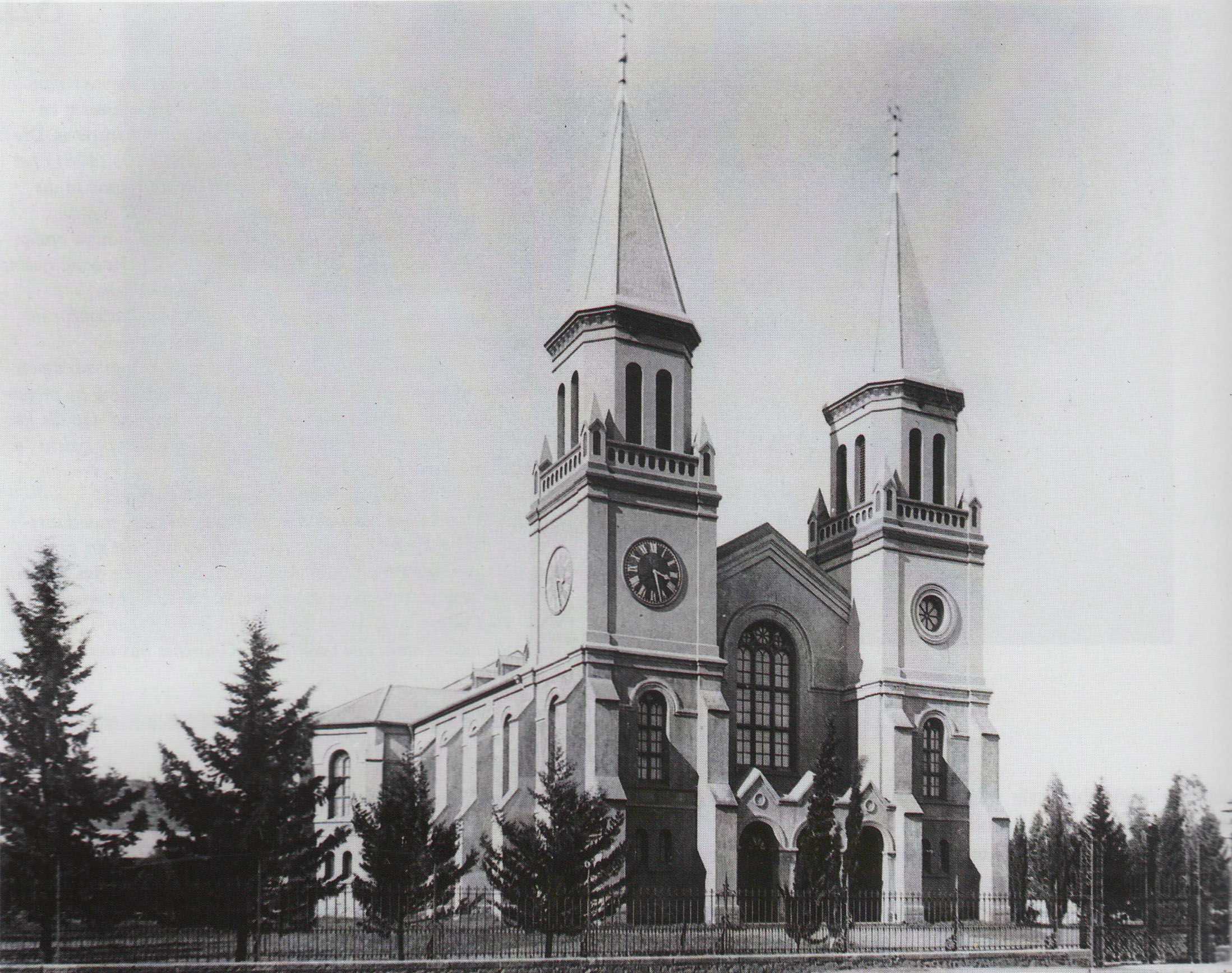
The Two Tower Church in Bloemfontein

In June 1912 Kestell and his family left Ficksburg after he accepted a call to the Two Tower Church in Bloemfontein. He was elected moderator of the Free State Church in 1909 and this honour was bestowed upon him again at the following Synodal sessions, in 1912 and 1916. As moderator, he was one of the speakers at the unveiling of the National Women's Monument in Bloemfontein on 16 December 1913. In 1911 he was elected chairman of the Council of Churches, the forerunner of the General Synod which was established in 1962. With the Rebellion of 1914 there was great disagreement in almost every congregation and the Church threatened to split, but Kestell succeeded in defuseing the issue with great wisdom at a conference of ministers on 27 January 1915 in Bloemfontein and again at the Synod of April 1915.

In March 1915 he co-founded the Helpmekaar movement, which raised money to pay the bail of the leaders of the armed uprising against the Union government's invasion of German South-West Africa. On 3 December 1916 he led the funeral of Pres. Steyn at the Vrouemonument. Through his work, money was raised for the orphans in the Free State after the great flu epidemic of 1918, which led to the establishment of Ons Kinderhuis in Bloemfontein.

== Director ==
In 1907, Kestell was appointed editor of De Fakkel, the organ of the Free State Dutch Reformed Church, which merged with De Kerkbode in 1910. On 13 January 1919, he said goodbye to his congregation and left for Cape Town to take up his new post. His weekly column Het stille uur was later compiled into two anthologies: Die stille uur (1930) and Uitgevryfde koringkorrels (1941). After his return to Bloemfontein, he later edited the founding column Ons kerklike lewe in Die Volksblad from 1929 until his death.

== Rector at Grey-College ==
In October 1920 he returned to the Orange Free State and was appointed rector of the Grey University College at the age of 65. Here he also acted as professor and full professor of national history. Under his leadership, the university began a major marketing campaign in which Kestell personally participated and through which the university college showed healthy growth. He resigned the rectorship in August 1925, but the Council would not accept it and he finally only resigned from this office at the end of September 1927.

Kestell had already taken the side of Afrikaans in the language struggle against Dutch at an early stage. In June 1909 he was one of the founding members of the South African Academy for Language, Literature and Arts. The Stellenbosch branch of the Afrikaans Language Association invited him to give a lecture on 22 October 1909, where he spoke on “The expressive power of the Afrikaans language”. This lecture was subsequently published verbatim in the newspapers and also printed in brochure form for use as propaganda.

The Bloemfontein students held a language festival in 1913 to celebrate the restoration of Dutch language rights, an event at which Kestell, along with G. Knothe, D. F. Malherbe and D.G. Conradie, acted as speaker. In his speech he particularly addressed the women to enlist their support for the language. On his assumption of office as rector of Grey University College in 1920, he gave a lecture on “Afrikaans as a medium in the University Colleges” to encourage the students to put the official recognition of Afrikaans as a language of instruction into practice.

== Bible translation ==
In collaboration with the Reformed and Reformed Churches, a Bible Translation Commission was appointed. Kestell was appointed as chairman of this commission, which was to appoint the translators.

Their task was to translate the Dutch State Bible into Afrikaans, but this attempt failed and there were many objections to the translation attempts. After this, the Synod of the Dutch Reformed Church appointed Kestell in 1923 as chairman of the Bible Translation Commission to translate the Bible from the original languages (Greek and Hebrew). In this capacity, he was co-responsible for the first Afrikaans Bible translation. Totius and Prof. B.B. Keet were initially the only final translators, but after Stellenbosch University refused to release Keet from his normal duties, Kestell was appointed in his place. Three more translators (H.C.M. Fourie, E.E. van Rooyen and B.B. Keet – after he finally obtained permission) were later appointed to assist them in this major task. Kestell was particularly responsible for the translation of the New Testament, which he had already completed in November 1926. In August 1933, the first printed Afrikaans Bibles were available.

== Cultural leader ==
Kestell was a popular speaker at public events. On 16 December 1929, during the Volks-en-Geloftedag festival celebration in Bloemfontein, he spoke about the meaning of day of an oath and the role of women during the Great Trek.

At the wreath-laying ceremony at the Women's Monument on 31 May 1938, he gave a message about the suffering and sacrifice of women during the Three Years' War. In 1938, during the symbolic trek to celebrate the centenary of the Great Trek, he appeared as a speaker on numerous occasions. On 17 February 1938, at the Blaauwkrantz centenary, he made a serious plea that Afrikaners should help their fellow countrymen, which he followed up with a similar plea at a meeting of interested parties on 16 March 1938 in Bloemfontein.

Through these and other meetings and pleas, he was the driving force behind the establishment of the Reddingsdaadbond in 1938 to uplift poor whites. This union was initially led by Nic Diederichs, later Minister of Finance and State President.

Kestell was a guest of honour at the laying of the cornerstone of the Voortrekker Monument on 16 December 1938. He was a member of the South African Academy of Science and Art, the Maatschappij der Nederlandse Letteren in Leiden and the Historische Genootschap of Utrecht.

== Death ==
On Sunday 9 February 1941,Kestell died of asthma at his home in Bloemfontein and was buried with Steyn and De Wet, fellow members of the Free State Tripartite, at the Women's Monument in Bloemfontein.

== Works ==
While he was a student at Stellenbosch, Nico Mansvelt instilled in him a love of literature. Here the urge to create for himself began and he began to write poems. His first attempts at writing were mainly in English. His first published poem, Death, appeared in the Cape Monthly Magazine of April 1877.

His first published book was an English play about Slagtersnek, The struggle for freedom or The rebellion of Slagters Nek (which he had printed in London at his own expense). This book appeared under the pseudonym Leinad, which is his middle name backwards. During his student days he also wrote an English novel (Two brothers) on this subject. When the play did not sell well, he buried the remaining copies in his garden and when the novel did not find a publisher, he burned the manuscript. The manuscript of The pioneers was rejected by the publisher R. Bentley & Son in December 1894 because, in their opinion, the treatment of this potentially interesting subject was not skillful enough. Among his surviving manuscripts are several writings in English dating from his early writing days, including a Biblical drama, Saul, a tragedy, and the novel Samson. After these failures, John no longer used English as a medium and now switched to Dutch, with several short stories initially appearing in Gereformeerd Maandblad.

=== Roman history ===
His creative work has a mostly historical background. As a writer, he mainly practices the romantic-tinged historical narrative. Slagtersnek: Een verhaal uit het grensleven van 1815 initially appeared in 1880 under the pseudonym Afrikanus Jr. as a series of articles in Het Zuid-Afrikaansche Tijdschrift and was then published in book form by D.F. du Toit & Co of Paarl. Although written in Dutch, the dialogue is mostly in Afrikaans.

The collection Uit het Afrikaansche Boerenleven is a collection of short stories that had previously appeared in Gereformeerd Maandblad and depict farmers in their daily lives within their mainly rural environment. Stories included in this include De schaapkraal, Een wonderlijke voorzienigheid (where the elder is sketched on a house visit with the minister), Piet Lubbe (about the Holy Communion celebration), De postdrijver (which depicts the time when the postcar was still driving between Kimberley and Bloemfontein at night) and Kerstvreugde (a story about Katrina, a prostitute in Kimberley). The original market of the church magazine is clear from the way in which, in addition to the storyline, the useful and edifying are also emphasized. These stories were later translated into Afrikaans and published as Modderrivier, a collection in which he also includes four stories from his follow-up collection.

Johanna Cloete and other stories is a collection of stories that were mostly previously published in Het Gereformeerde Maandblad and Ons Tijdschrift. The title story, Johanna Cloete, as well as Klein Hans Smal and Hy is nie van jou soort nie are all stories from the history of the Voortrekkers, from which he also draws moral lessons in addition to the storyline. Other stories in the collection such as Hare eerste Avondsmaalviering, De Meester and Het beroep van den predikant naar Y are largely set in a village setting and are mainly romantic in nature. These stories were also adapted into Afrikaans for later editions. Together with Nico Hofmeyr he wrote the historical novel De Voortrekkers, or het Dagboek van Izak van der Merwe, in which the story is cast in the form of a diary of an imaginary Voortrekker and the most important events of the trek from Christmas Eve 1834 to 16 December 1838 are set out in diary form.

=== Non fiction work ===
He produced several works, mainly non-fictional in nature. Die Voortrekkers is a collection of lectures in the form of a “historical story” that he gave in Kimberley. In it, the causes and the main events in connection with the Great Trek up to 16 December 1838 are concisely and clearly explained.

He wrote a biography of his father-in-law, Het leven van prof. N.J. Hofmeyr, which, in addition to biographical details, contains important historical information about the church history of the second half of the nineteenth century. The origin and expansion of the Theological Seminary at Stellenbosch is described in detail.

Abraham Paul Kriel is a biography about his fellow student and teacher who established the famous children's home in Langlaagte where orphans are cared for.

The biography of Christiaan Rudolf de Wet, in addition to his heroic deeds during the Anglo-Boer War, also gives an overview of his youth and the difficult years that followed his marriage. The treatment of the Rebellion and the description of De Wet's role in it and his thoughts at this time are very informative. He also helps General De Wet with the writing of his famous war memoirs De strijd tusschen Boer en Brit.

John's own memoirs of the Anglo-Boer War, Met de Boeren commando's (subtitled Mijn Ervaringen als Veldprediker) are based on his war diary and are translated into German, Afrikaans and English (Through shot and flame). These books have all been printed overseas, but the Dutch version is banned by the British government in South Africa because it could incite racial hatred due to the description of the actions of British soldiers therein.

Together with D.E. van Velden of Transvaal, he wrote the report on the peace negotiations at the end of the Anglo-Boer War, De vredesonderhandelingen tusschen Boer en Brit, which was later translated into Afrikaans by Fred le Roux.[1]

From the column Die stille uur that he maintains for Die Kerkbode, two volumes are compiled, namely Die stille uur and Uitgevryfde koringkorels. These are Christian columns, in which he takes verses from the Bible and discusses them. The columns Ons kerklike leve in Die Volksblad are preparatory work for two volumes of sketches on the religious and social issues that affect his people, namely My nasie in nood and Terug na die God van ons vaders

== Honours ==
The town of Kestell in the Free State, between Harrismith and Bethlehem, was founded in 1905 and named after him.

The University of South Africa appointed him Vice-Chancellor in 1926, a position he held for two years. In 1932, the University of South Africa awarded him an honorary Doctor of Theology (D.D. degree) and this honour was followed by a D.Litt. degree from the University of Pretoria and in 1934 an LL.D. degree from the University of Cape Town. In 1939, he was nominated Chancellor by his alma mater, the University of Stellenbosch.

The Voortrekker movement honoured him in September 1940 by awarding him the Order of Friend of the Voortrekkers.

Various festivals are held in his honour. On 4 October 1938, the Federation of Afrikaans Cultural Associations organises a festival in Bloemfontein in his honour, during which he is honoured in several speeches. On this occasion, Totius, on behalf of the people, presents him with a painting by W.H. Coetzer of the Voortrekkers at Drakensberg and a bust of him by Laurika Postma is unveiled. In September 1938, a Kestell festival is held at Petrusburg in the Free State. With the issuance of special stamps in 2001 to commemorate heroes of the Anglo-Boer War, a stamp is also issued in his honour.

== Publications ==
Written works:

Jaar	Naam van publikasie
1880	The struggle for freedom
1881	Slagtersnek: Een verhaal uit het grensleven van 1815
1889	De Voortrekkers, of het Dagboek van Izak van der Merwe (saam met Nico Hofmeyr)
	Uit het Afrikaansche boerenleven
1899	Johanna Cloete en andere verhalen
1903	Met de Boeren commando's
1909	De vredesonderhandelingen tusschen Boer en Brit (saam met D.E. van Velden)
1911	Het leven van prof N.J. Hofmeyr
	Abraham Paul Kriel
1920	Die Voortrekkers
	Christiaan Rudolf de Wet
1926	Modderrivier
1930	Die stille uur
1940	Terug na die God van ons vaders
1941	My nasie in nood
	Uitgevryfde koringkorrels

== See also ==
- Kestellhof

== Source list ==
=== Books ===
- Antonissen, Rob. Die Afrikaanse letterkunde van aanvang tot hede. Nasou Beperk Derde hersiene uitgawe Tweede druk 1964
- Conradie, Elizabeth. Hollandse skrywers in Suid-Afrika (Deel 2) (1875–1905). J.H. de Bussy/H.A.U.M, Kaapstad/Pretoria, 1949
- Dekker, G. Afrikaanse Literatuurgeskiedenis. Nasou Beperk Kaapstad Elfde druk 1970
- (af) De Kock, W.J. 1968. Suid-Afrikaanse Biografiese Woordeboek. Pretoria: Nasionale Raad vir Sosiale Navorsing, Departement van Hoër Onderwys.
- Kannemeyer, J.C. Geskiedenis van die Afrikaanse literatuur 1. Academica, Pretoria en KaapstadTweede druk 1984
- Kannemeyer, J.C. Die Afrikaanse literatuur 1652–2004. Human & Rousseau Kaapstad en Pretoria Eerste uitgawe 2005
- Nasionale Pers Beperk. Ons skrywers en hul werke: ’n Plate-album. Nasionale Pers Bpk. Kaapstad 1936
- (af) Nienaber, P.J. 1963. Suid-Afrikaanse Pleknaamwoordeboek. Kaapstad, Johannesburg: Suid-Afrikaanse Boeksentrum.
- Nienaber, P.J. et al. Perspektief en Profiel. Afrikaanse Pers-Boekhandel Johannesburg Derde hersiene uitgawe 1969
- Schoonees, P.C. Die prosa van die tweede Afrikaanse beweging. J.H. de Bussy, Pretoria / Hollandsch-Afrikaansche Uitgevers Maatschappij v/h J. Dusseau & Co, Kaapstad 1939 (derde druk)
- Van Coller, H.P. (red.) Perspektief en Profiel Deel I. J.L. van Schaik-Uitgewers Pretoria Eerste uitgawe 1998
- Van Coller, H.P. (red.) Perspektief en Profiel Deel 3. Van Schaik-Uitgewers Pretoria Eerste uitgawe 2006
