= Prince Hlela =

South African soccer player

Personal information
- Full name: Prince Thabo Hlela
- Date of birth: 28 May 1984 (age 42)
- Place of birth: Heidelberg, South Africa
- Height: 1.81 m (5 ft 11 1/2 in)
- Position: Left back

Senior career*
Years	Team	Apps	(Gls)
2007–2010	Free State Stars	1	(0)
2008–2009	→ Carara Kicks (loan)	20	(2)
2010–2012	Bloemfontein Celtic	34	(4)
2012–2013	AmaZulu	5	(0)
2013	→ SuperSport United (loan)	1	(0)
2013–2015	Polokwane City	2	(0)
2017–2018	Super Eagles	9	(0)

International career^{‡}
2011	South Africa	1	(0)
- * Club domestic league appearances and goals as of 1 January 2019 ‡ National team caps and goals as of 1 January 2019

Prince Hlela (born 28 May 1984) is a South African soccer player who played as a defender in the Premier Soccer League.

== Club career ==
Hlela began his professional career at Free State Stars and had a loan spell at Carara Kicks. He has also played for Bloemfontein Celtic, AmaZulu and SuperSport United. Hlela joined newly promoted Premier Soccer League team Polokwane City in September 2013.

== International career ==
He made his debut for South Africa on 14 May 2011 versus Tanzania in an international friendly. He came on as a substitute in the third minute of injury time after the 90th minute. Other players to make their debuts in the game were Thabo Matlaba, Lehlohonolo Majoro, Thandani Ntshumayelo and Eric Mathoho.
