= Prince John =

Prince John may refer to:

- John, King of England (1166–1216) known as Prince John during the reigns of his father and older brother
- Prince John of the United Kingdom (1905–1919), youngest son of King George V
- John of Eltham, Earl of Cornwall (1316–1336), second son of Edward II
- John of Gaunt, 1st Duke of Lancaster (1340-1399), third son of Edward III
- John of Lancaster, 1st Duke of Bedford (1389–1435), second son of Henry IV
- John, Prince of Asturias, (1478–1497), only son of Ferdinand II of Aragon and Isabella I of Castile
- Prince Alexander John of Wales (1871), third son and youngest child of Edward VII
- Prince John Konstantinovich of Russia (1886–1918), great-grandson of Nicholas I of Russia
- Prince John August of Saxe-Gotha-Altenburg (1704–1767), son of Frederick II, Duke of Saxe-Gotha-Altenburg

== Other ==
- Nickname of Confederate general John B. Magruder
- Prince John (horse), champion racehorse
