= Princess (beauty pageant) =

Beauty pageant in Japan

The Princess is a beauty pageant in Japan that selects the contestant to represent each district at this beauty pageant. It started in 2007, and is held annually throughout Japan.

== Official website ==
- ミスコンテスト | プリンセス | アナウンサー・モデル・タレントの登竜門（公式ウェブサイト）
- ミスコンテスト｜プリンセス（Facebook officialpage）
