= The Princess (Maykov poem) =

Princess
- Author: Apollon Maykov
- Original title: Княжна
- Language: Russian
- Genre: Poem
- Publication date: 1878
- Publication place: Russia
- Media type: Print (hardback & paperback)

The Princess (Russian: Княжна, Knyazhna) is a poem by Apollon Maykov first published in the January 1878 issue of The Russian Messenger. It told the story of a young Russian girl belonging to a noble family who joined a group of radical youth fighting against the repressive state. The poem, condemned by the Russian literary left of the time, in retrospect is seen as a strong political statement attacking both the corrupt political system of mid-19th-century Russia, based on serfdom and the violent methods of undermining it, as professed by the 'nihilistic' youth of the time.

== Background ==
Initially the target of Maykov's satire was serfdom, and in the poem's early versions, the heroine was a young conservative woman. Later Princess Zhenya turned into a rebel who detested the environment that she had been brought up in, but still in some ways was corrupted by it. Finally, the author has made his heroine a symbol of the Russian cultural elite's infatuation with the Socialist ideas, which had no bearing upon the country's history and cultural traditions, as the author saw it. "[The heroine] is the symbol of our old life, or rather the life of our high society which had lost the spiritual bond with its people but is still bound to the lower classes by common history [part of which is] serfdom. [This high society] is still the holder of Russia's historical legacy and – even if by inertia - on its way to fulfill its historical mission," wrote Maykov in his unpublished "Notes on the insinuations, concerning the Princess". "...Zhenya is planning to start a new life. Our liberals, criticising me, assume that Zhenya symbolizes the start of a new era. I cannot deny - I even agree - that the principles professed by this girl and the generation she belongs to... mark the end of the old times. But I refuse to greet them as heralds of the dawn of some kind of new era," Maykov explained later in the same essay.

In the finale of the poem's original version, Zhenya was departing to the front lines of the Russo-Turkish War as a sister of mercy. The later version of it posed the question: "And what about Zhenya, poor Zhenya? What happened to her? Has she vanished into the dark? Found herself in a Siberian prison, victim of her own heinous doctrines? Or could she have gone, through some transformation... to a monastery to 'pray for her own sins', or to some holy sites? All this is possible, and each road is a thorny one."

=== Critical response ===
Maykov's "Princess" outraged the Russian democratic press of the time. The article "Mr. Maykov as a Judge of the New Generation of Women", by M.Artemyeva, written for Vospitaniye i Obrazovaniye magazine, was banned by censors. The liberal author and historian Orest Miller in an 1888 article (Russkaya Mysl, No.8, 1888) suggested that the "hypertrophied fear of nihilism" did the author a lot of harm.
