= Vladimir Benediktov =

Vladimir Grigoryevich Benediktov
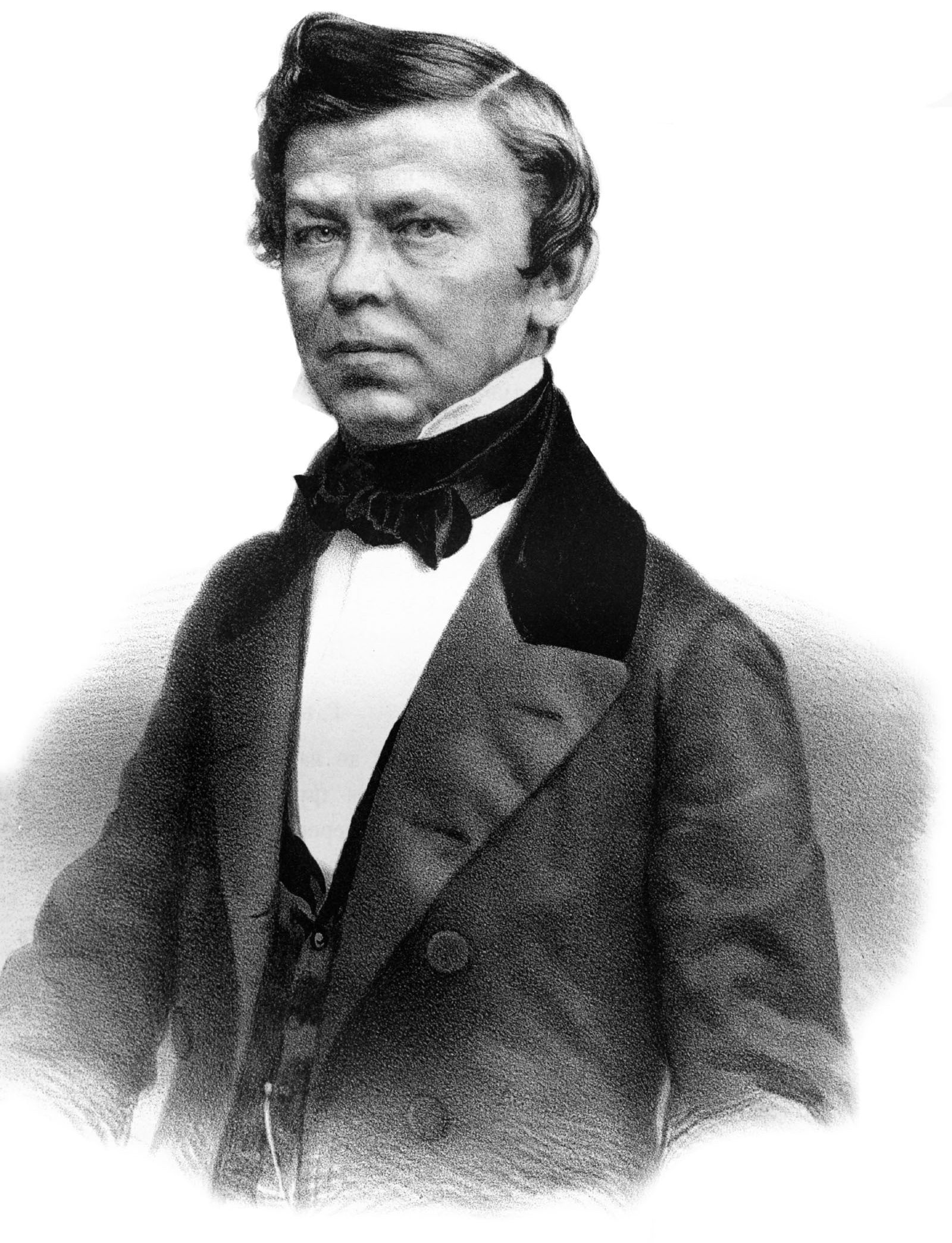
- Born: Владимир Григорьевич Бенедиктов; 17 November 1807; Saint Petersburg, Russian Empire
- Died: 26 April 1873 (aged 65); Saint Petersburg, Russian Empire
- Occupations: poet, translator

Vladimir Grigoryevich Benediktov (Russian: Влади́мир Григо́рьевич Бенеди́ктов; (17 November [5 o.s.] 1807, in Saint Petersburg, Russian Empire – 26 April [14 o.s.] 1873, in Saint Petersburg, Russian Empire) was a Russian romantic poet and translator, of Goethe, Schiller, Barbier, Gautier and Mickiewicz, among others.

== Biography ==
Vladimir Benediktov was born in Saint Petersburg and spent his early years in Petrozavodsk where his father, a minor nobleman and a descendant of an old clergymen's family received a post in a local governor's office. After studying in the Olonets gymnasium, he joined the Second Cadet Corps military school in Saint Petersburg in 1821. After five years of the army service (in the course of which he took part in suppressing the 1830 Polish Uprising) Benediktov retired and in 1832 joined the Ministry of Finance as a clerk, giving his spare time to three hobbies: mathematics, astronomy and writing poetry.

Benediktov's debut poetry collection released in 1835 brought him success and fame; Vasily Zhukovsky referred to it as a masterpiece and Alexander Pushkin was known to have praised it. Yet, Vissarion Belinsky, while crediting the author with being technically impressive, expressed reservations about his peculiar mix of garish Romantic imagery and prosaic details. In 1838 Benediktov's second book became a best-seller, with 3 thousand copies sold, a huge number for the Russian literary market of the time.

In 1860-1870s Benediktov's poetry became less flashy and more introspective, justifying the tag "thinking man's poet", Stepan Shevyryov has once given him. In 1855 Benediktov became a Saint Petersburg Imperial Academy of Sciences' member. In 1856 The Complete Beneditov in 3 volumes came out, re-issued and expanded a year later and featuring a foreword by editor Yakov Polonsky.

Benediktov is considered one of the most prominent Russian translators of the 19th century (of Goethe, Friedrich Schiller, Henri Auguste Barbier, Pierre Jules Théophile Gautier and Adam Mickiewicz, Lord Byron, Shakespeare, among others). His most successful translations were those of Pierre Jules Théophile Gautier and Victor Hugo, two masters he felt close aesthetic affinity to.
