= Slavic school (historiography) =

19th-century current in Slavic historical writing

The Slavic school (Russian: славянская школа, romanized: slavyanskaya shkola) was a current in 19th-century Russian and Slavic historical writing whose writers held that the ancestors of the Slavs were peoples known from ancient sources, among them the Trojans, Scythians, Sarmatians, Roxolani, Goths, Huns, Bulgars, Vandals, Varangians and Etruscans. They sought to show that the Slavs were as old and as civilised as the peoples of Western Europe, and most of them rejected the Norman origin of Rus'.

The anthropologist Victor Shnirelman places Mikhail Lomonosov among its forerunners, and Yuri Venelin and Zorian Dołęga-Chodakowski, active in the 1820s and 1830s, among its founders. Later writers included Alexander Chertkov, Nikolai Savelyev-Rostislavich, Alexander Veltman, Egor Klassen and, in the 1870s, Dmitry Ilovaysky. The school's writers argued mainly from the etymology of ethnic and place names and from new readings of Greek, Latin, Byzantine and Scandinavian texts.

Contemporaries rejected most of the school's identifications, and later historians such as Shnirelman and Vladimir Petrukhin regard them as refuted, though Shnirelman credits its founders with raising real questions about early Slavic history. Writers of the modern "Slavic-Aryan" myth have taken up its ideas.

== Name ==
The anthropologist Victor Shnirelman uses "Slavic school", in quotation marks, as the heading of his account of the movement in The Aryan Myth in the Modern World. He cites the Soviet historian Vladimir Picheta, who in 1923 described "this school" as strong in "national-patriotic chauvinism, but very far from real science". In its entry on Savelyev-Rostislavich, the Russian Biographical Dictionary speaks of "Venelin's school", among whose followers he was "usually counted".

== Background ==
=== Dalmatian humanists and Orbini ===
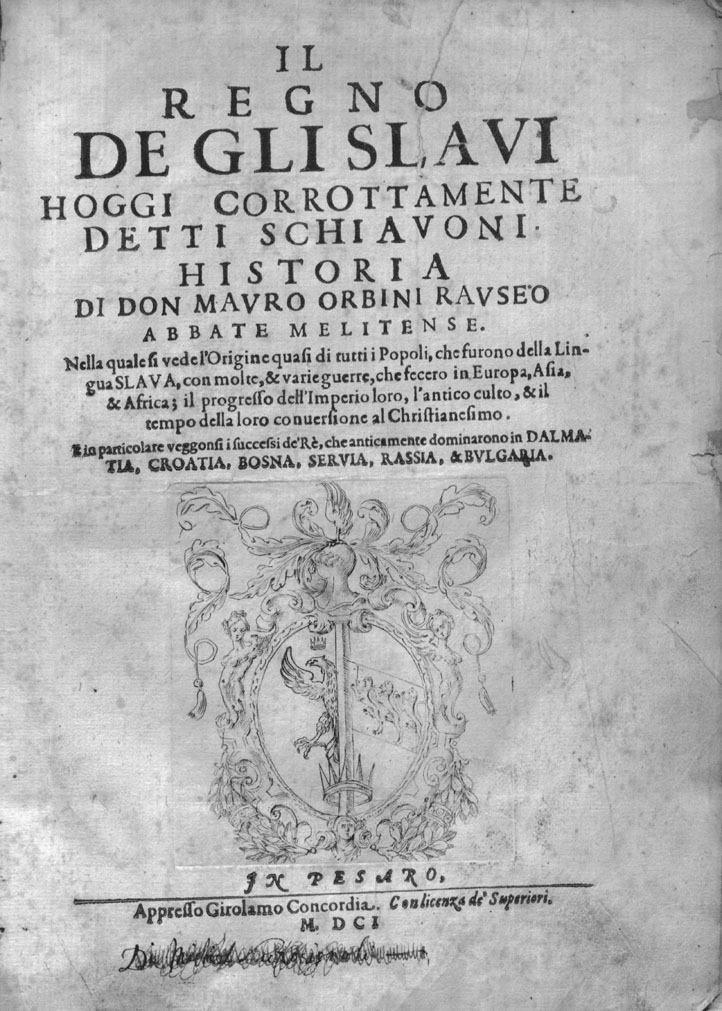
Title page of Mavro Orbini's Il Regno de gli Slavi (Pesaro, 1601)

The idea that famous ancient peoples were Slavs is older than the 19th century. Thomas the Archdeacon of Split, who lived in the first half of the 13th century, and the chronicle of the Priest of Duklja called the Croats "Goths". In its prologue the chronicler says he was asked to translate from Slavonic into Latin "the book of the Goths, which in Latin is called [the book] of the Kings of the Slavs" (libellum Gothorum quod Latine Sclavorum dicitur regum). Its first chapter tells of a people called the Goths who came from the north under three brothers, Brus, Totila and Ostroyllus.

In a speech given on Hvar in 1525 and printed in Venice in 1532, the humanist Vinko Pribojević introduced the pan-Slavic idea "so as to grant a historical legitimacy" to Hvar, Dalmatia and the Slavs in general. In Il Regno de gli Slavi (Pesaro, 1601), which drew on more than 300 authors, Mavro Orbini presented the wars and victories of the Goths, Ostrogoths and Visigoths as Slavic and, following Pribojević, derived the name of the Slavs from slava, "glory". In Orbini's account the Slavs descended from Japheth and multiplied in Scandinavia until it could no longer hold them. They left it in 1460 BC together with the Goths, "who were one and the same people" with them, and conquered all of European Sarmatia. His chapter on the Alans describes them as Slavs from Scandinavia, "the common fatherland of all the Slavs". One part of them settled in Asia and was "now called Tatars", while the rest were named Scythians or Dacians, although they "would better have been called Goths", since they had "one and the same language". In 1603 the book was placed on the Roman Inquisition's Index of Forbidden Books. A Russian translation by Savva Raguzinsky-Vladislavich was printed in St Petersburg in 1722 on the order of Peter I.

=== The Synopsis, Tatishchev and Lomonosov ===
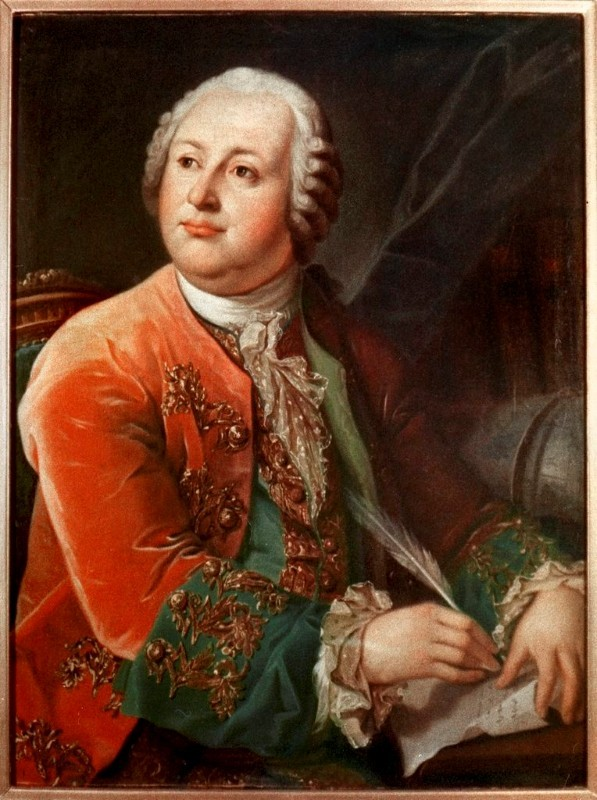
Mikhail Lomonosov

The Synopsis, a history first printed in Kyiv in the 17th century, remained popular in Russia from the second half of that century until the early 19th century. It derived Rus' from the Sarmatian Roxolani, "as if Rossi and Alani", following the Polish Sarmatist scheme that derived the Poles from the Sarmatians.

Vasily Tatishchev proposed an Iranian (Sarmatian) origin for the name Rus' and connected the Varangians with the Baltic Slavic Wagri. In the mid-18th century Lomonosov opposed the account of the Russian state's origins given by the German scholars of the St Petersburg Academy. Drawing on the Synopsis, he wrote that the Russians were the Roxolani and that "the Slavs and Sarmatians were one people". For Lomonosov the earliest Slavs, the Veneti, came from Troy, and the Bulgars of the Black Sea and the Volga were Slavs. He was the first to link the Rus' with the Baltic island of Rügen.

== History ==
=== Founders: Venelin and Dołęga-Chodakowski ===
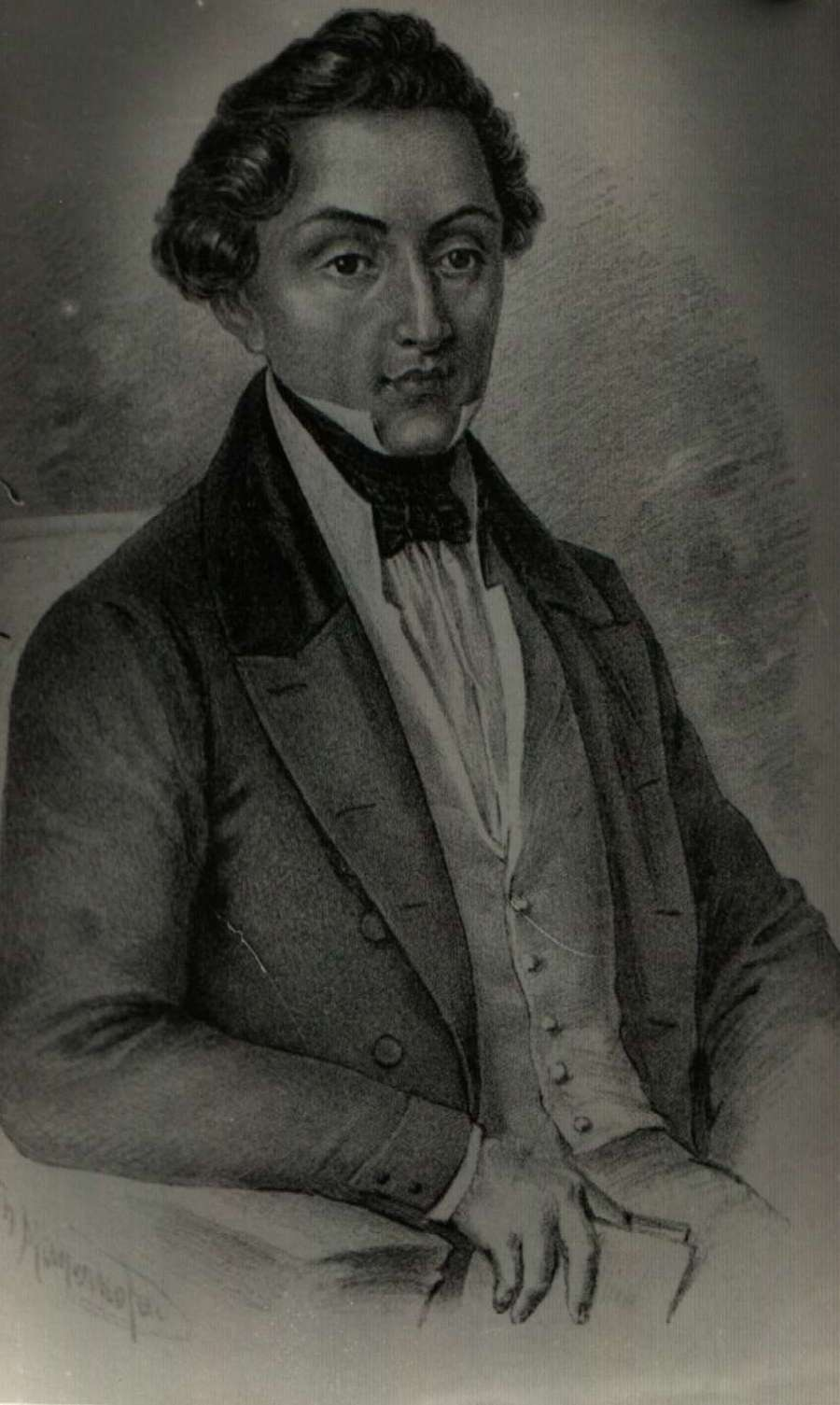
Yuri Venelin

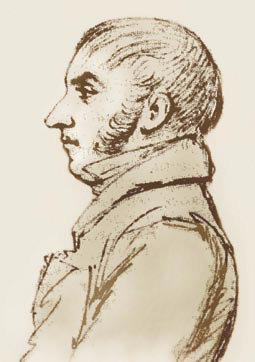
Zorian Dołęga-Chodakowski

Shnirelman traces the school to Lomonosov and to several Slavic enlighteners of the early 19th century. He writes that they shared a wish to "restore justice" by showing that the Slavs were no younger and no less civilised than the peoples of Western Europe. They resented the German school then dominant in history, which treated the early Slavs as savages who received learning from the Germans.

Venelin and Dołęga-Chodakowski were active in the 1820s and 1830s. Venelin was a Carpathian Rusyn whose work helped the Bulgarian National Revival. Dołęga-Chodakowski came from the Belarusian lands of the former Polish state, fought for Napoleon and became a propagandist of Slavic unity. He argued that Slavic history and civilisation had deep pre-Christian roots, and tried to describe the way of life and beliefs of the pagan Slavs. In his first article, On Slavdom before Christianity (O Sławiańszczyźnie przed chrześcijaństwem, 1818), and in Investigations Concerning Russian History (1819), he called for the close study of living antiquity, including hillforts, which in his view were the remains of sacred enclosures where pagan rites had once been held.

Venelin wanted to awaken Bulgarian national feeling by recovering a great Bulgarian past, which led him to the question of early Slavic unity. In The Ancient and Present-Day Bulgarians (1829) he argued that the Proto-Bulgars were Slavs, and at the same time rejected the Norman theory. Nikolai Polevoy's summary of the book in 1829 lists its other claims, that the Huns, Avars and Khazars were Slavs, that Attila was a Slav, and that the Russians descended from the Roxolani. Shnirelman adds that for Venelin the Scythians and Sarmatians were Slavs too, and that Venelin described a "Hunno-Avaro-Khazar state" as the "kingdom of the Russian people". In Shnirelman's account Venelin was also the first to write that the Etruscans were Slavs. In Kishinev in 1823–1825 Venelin had made excerpts from Greek and Roman authors and medieval chroniclers on the peoples of the Balkans.

=== Chertkov and Savelyev-Rostislavich ===
Alexander Chertkov (1789–1858) published a series of studies in the Vremennik of the Moscow Society of Russian History and Antiquities, on the migration of the Thracian tribes across the Danube and north to the Baltic and Rus' (1851), on the Thracian tribes of Asia Minor (1852), on the Pelasgo-Thracian tribes of Italy (1853), and on the language of the Pelasgians of Italy compared with Old Slavonic (1857). He held that the Slavs and Thracians were one people, and saw traces of the first Slavs in the Etruscans and the earliest Romans. His method was to search Greek, Roman and Byzantine sources for the "forgotten names and deeds" of the Slavs.

Nikolai Savelyev-Rostislavich (1815–1854) wrote History, Geography and Archaeology of the Ancient Slavic World (1840) and further works up to the Slavic Collection (1845). He was one of the sharpest opponents of the Norman theory. He called the Migration Period "pure fiction", and argued that from the 5th century the Russians had formed a vast state covering almost half of Europe.

=== Veltman ===
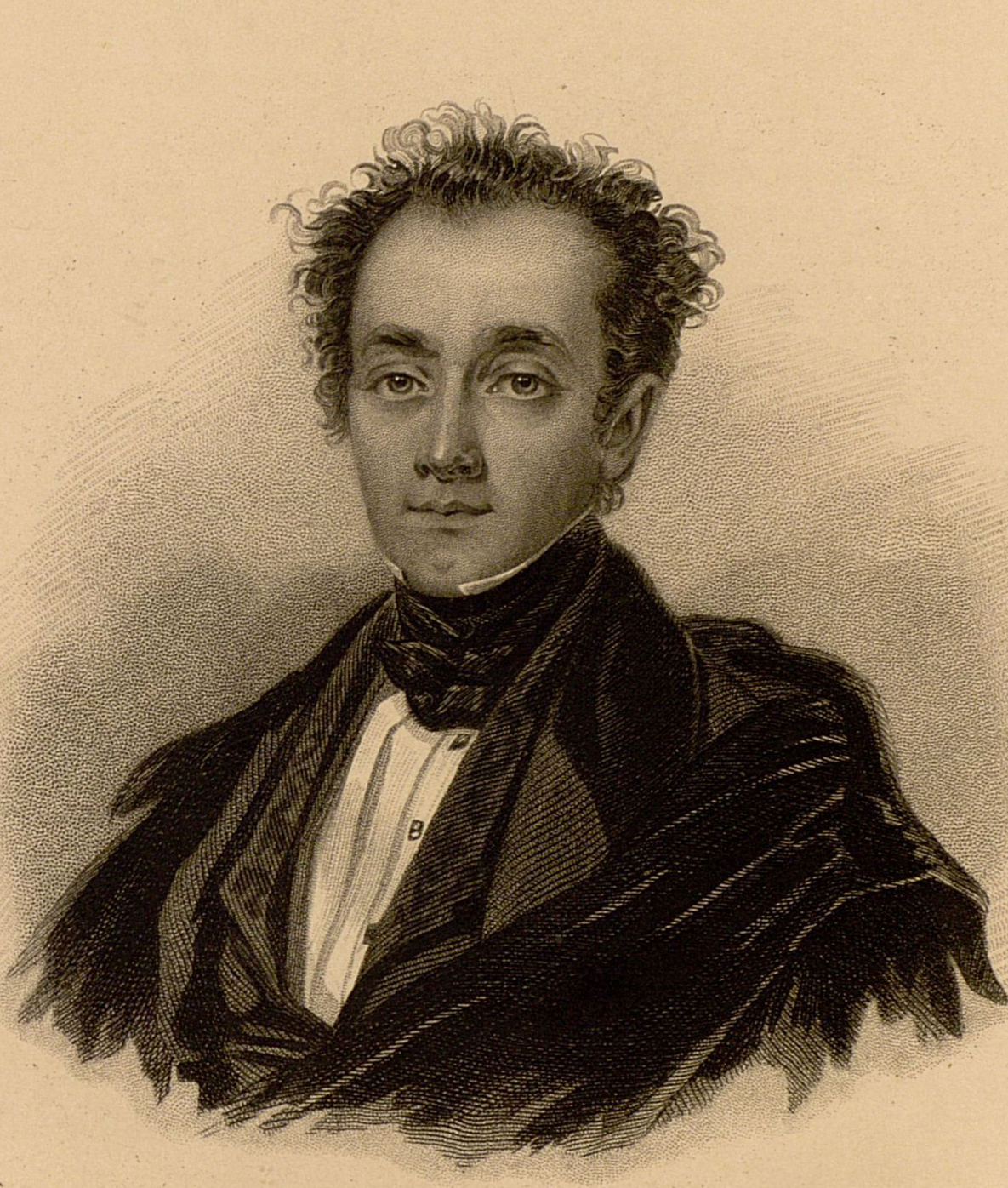
Alexander Veltman, 1841

The writer Alexander Veltman presented his history of the Huns in Attila and Rus' in the 4th and 5th Centuries (1858). In the book the Huns were the Kyiane, the people of Kyiv, and the Latin names Hunni, Chuni and Chueni were renderings of their Russian name. One chapter is titled "Attila, Grand Prince of Kyiv and Autocrat of All Rus'". He held that the Alans, Vandals, Heruli, Khazars, Cimbri, Langobards, Saxons and Franks were Slavs, and that Slavs had lived on the Dnieper a thousand years before Christ.

For Veltman the Goths were not Slavs. In his history they were Dacians who settled on Zealand at the end of the 1st century, took the name of Danes and were long the enemies of the Baltic Slavs. In 376 a Kyivan prince he called Bolemir, aided by Volhynia, drove them from Rus' across the Danube into Thrace. He distrusted Ammianus Marcellinus and Jordanes as partial to the Goths, and argued from etymology and folk tradition.

=== Klassen ===
Egor Klassen (1795–1862) published New Materials for the Ancient History of the Slavs in General and the Slavo-Russes before Rurik in Particular in three issues (1854, 1861). He argued that the Baltic Veneti were Slavs who, pressed by the Goths in 216 BC, gave up their amber coast and founded Novgorod on Lake Ilmen in that year. He wrote that in AD 166 the Rus', the Roxolani of the classical writers, drove the Goths from the Baltic coast. In Klassen's etymology the Gothic royal title meant ataman or hetman, and Ermanaric was "Erman the hetman".

Klassen held that the Scandinavians took their whole mythology from the Slavs, and placed their gods' home on Mount Ida, "in ancient Trojan Rus'", and in Asgard on the Sea of Azov. The third issue gave an extract from what Klassen presented as a guide written by Zoroaster for Veneti colonists moving from Bactria to the Baltic. By his reckoning this put the Slavs' ancestors at 2000 BC or earlier. Klassen also published his Russian translation of the Polish antiquarian Tadeusz Wolański's Description of Monuments Explaining Slavo-Russian History. In its preface Wolański wrote that the Slavs had once been scattered over all parts of the Old World and had left monuments everywhere, and that the key to all undeciphered ancient inscriptions "is found only in the primordial Slavic language". He promised to show Slavic inscriptions on stones from Numidia, Carthage and Egypt.

Shnirelman writes that for Klassen the Russians were direct descendants of the Trojans and the Scythians and Sarmatians were Slavs, and that Klassen sought to show that the Slavs had a state no later than the Phoenicians, Greeks or Romans. The archaeologist Aleksandr Formozov summarises Klassen's view that the "Slavo-Russes", educated earlier than the Romans and Greeks, had left monuments across the Old World, among them the Etruscan inscriptions and the ruins of Troy, and that the Iliad was composed not by Homer but by the Russian bard Boyan.

=== Ilovaysky and the Roxolani ===
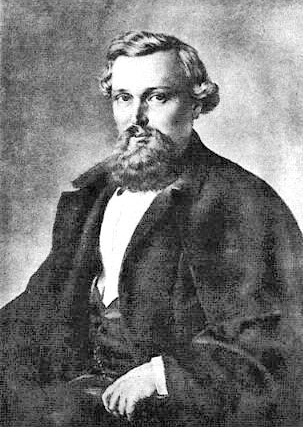
Dmitry Ilovaysky

In the 1870s Ilovaysky made similar arguments in Investigations on the Beginning of Rus' (1876, second edition 1882). He held that the Rus' were native Slavs, not Scandinavians, and that both the people and its name came from the Roxolani, whom Strabo and Ptolemy placed by the Sea of Azov. He also wrote that the Antes, Scythians and Sarmatians of Procopius and Maurice were one people and, following Venelin, that the Huns and Bulgars were Slavs.

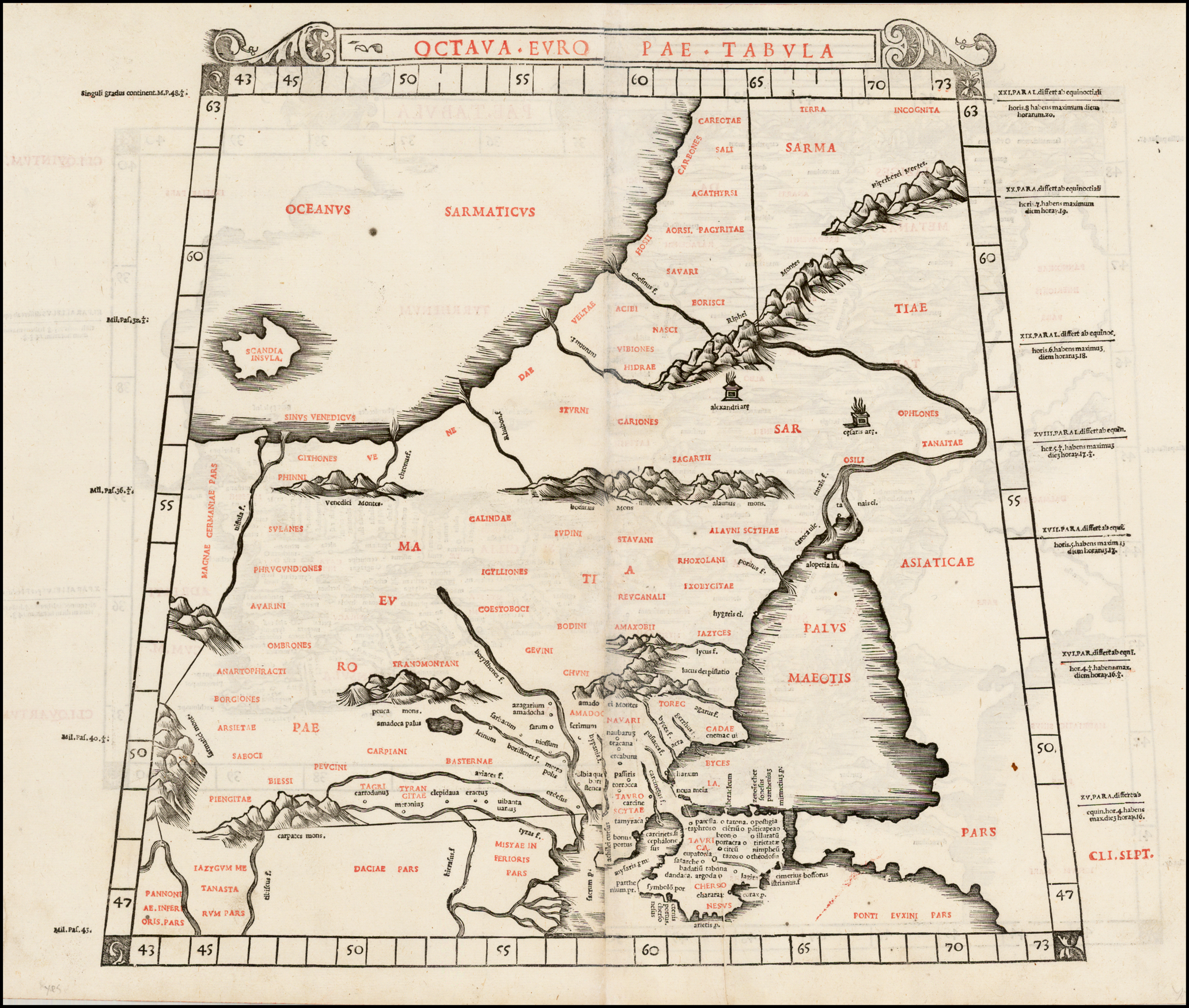
Sarmatia in a 1511 edition of Ptolemy's Geography. Ilovaysky cited Ptolemy for placing the Roxolani by the Sea of Azov.

In the Investigations Ilovaysky wrote that the Scythians formed a branch of the Aryan or Indo-European family, "namely the Germano-Slavo-Lithuanian branch", whose cradle lay in the lands watered by the Oxus and the Jaxartes, which the Scythians' southern neighbours called Turan. He placed the Royal Scythians, Sarmatians, Budini and Neuri in a family of Slavo-Lithuanian peoples, in which "the Slavic tribe of course predominated". Like "true ancestors of the Eastern Slavs", he wrote, the Scythians loved steam baths.

Ilovaysky placed an early Rus' on the Sea of Azov, in close contact with the Black Sea Bulgars. He wrote that the Ulichi and Tivertsi of the Primary Chronicle were Bulgar tribes and that the "Scythians" of the lower Dnieper and the Azov coast were Gothic and Slavic tribes. In a footnote he suggested that the "ages of Troyan" in The Tale of Igor's Campaign referred not to the emperor Trajan but to the Trojan War, known in Rus' through Bulgarian translations of the Troy tales, and that memories of the two may have mixed.

== Identifications ==
The table gives each writer's account in chronological order.

Writer	Main work	Peoples held to be Slavs	The writer's account
Mavro Orbini	Il Regno de gli Slavi (1601)	Goths, Ostrogoths, Visigoths, Vandals, Alans	The Goths and the Slavs were "one and the same people", and both came from Scandinavia. The wars and victories of the Goths were Slavic victories. The name of the Slavs comes from slava, "glory".
Synopsis, Tatishchev, Lomonosov	17th–18th centuries	Sarmatians, Roxolani, Trojans, Bulgars	Synopsis: Rus' came from the Roxolani, "as if Rossi and Alani". Tatishchev: the name Rus' was Sarmatian, and the Varangians were connected with the Baltic Slavic Wagri. Lomonosov: "the Slavs and Sarmatians were one people"; the earliest Slavs, the Veneti, came from Troy, and the Bulgars were Slavs.
Venelin	The Ancient and Present-Day Bulgarians (1829)	Proto-Bulgars, Huns, Avars, Khazars, Scythians, Sarmatians, Etruscans	Attila was a Slav, and the Russians descended from the Roxolani. A "Hunno-Avaro-Khazar state" was the "kingdom of the Russian people".
Chertkov	Studies in the Vremennik (1851–1857)	Thracians, Pelasgians, Etruscans, earliest Romans	The Slavs and Thracians were one people. Greek, Roman and Byzantine sources keep the "forgotten names and deeds" of the Slavs.
Savelyev-Rostislavich	History, Geography and Archaeology of the Ancient Slavic World (1840)	—N/a	The Migration Period was "pure fiction". From the 5th century the Russians had a state covering almost half of Europe.
Veltman	Attila and Rus' (1858)	Huns, Scythians, Alans, Vandals, Heruli, Khazars, Cimbri, Langobards, Saxons, Franks	The Huns were the Kyiane, and Attila was "Grand Prince of Kyiv and Autocrat of All Rus'". Slavs lived on the Dnieper a thousand years before Christ. The Goths were Dacians and enemies of the Slavs.
Klassen	New Materials (1854–1861)	Veneti, Trojans, Scythians, Sarmatians, Roxolani, Etruscans	The Veneti founded Novgorod in 216 BC. The Slavs had a state no later than the Phoenicians, Greeks or Romans. The Scandinavians took their mythology from the Slavs.
Ilovaysky	Investigations on the Beginning of Rus' (1876, 2nd ed. 1882)	Roxolani, Antes, Scythians, Sarmatians, Huns, Bulgars	The Scythians were a Germano-Slavo-Lithuanian people from the Oxus and Jaxartes, among whom the Slavs predominated. Rus' and its name came from the Roxolani, whom Strabo and Ptolemy placed by the Sea of Azov. The Ulichi and Tivertsi were Bulgar tribes.

Veltman, Klassen and Ilovaysky, unlike Orbini, kept the Goths apart from the Slavs. In Veltman's history the Goths were Dacians and enemies of the Slavs. In Klassen's they were invaders who drove the Veneti from the Baltic, and Ilovaysky wrote of "Gothic and Slavic tribes" as distinct peoples.

== Reception ==
=== In the 19th century ===
The school's critics included Slavists and Russian patriots as well as supporters of the Norman theory. According to Shnirelman, even Ivan Zabelin, himself a patriotic historian, was very sceptical of the school and wrote of the absurdity of many of its "achievements".

In 1829 Polevoy answered Venelin's book with a mocking note in Moskovsky Telegraf that listed Venelin's identifications. Pavel Jozef Šafárik called Venelin's work "uncritical, full of various fantasies, misconceptions, inaccuracies and absurdities". The historian M. M. Frolova writes that the scarcity of evidence led Venelin's "ardent and romantic nature" to supply much by imagination. The Soviet historian S. A. Nikitin wrote that Chertkov's identification of the Slavs with the Thracians found no support in the scholarship of his time or later. Vissarion Belinsky, reviewing the Slavic Collection, wrote that the theories of Lomonosov on which Savelyev-Rostislavich relied were mistaken. The Russian Biographical Dictionary states that Savelyev-Rostislavich's research had no influence on the development of historical scholarship. Shnirelman writes that in his own time Klassen was not even regarded as a historian.

Nikolai Dobrolyubov reviewed Veltman's Attila and Rus' in Sovremennik in 1858. He mocked its "boundless pan-Slavism" and parodied its etymological rules, under which any vowel could become any vowel, any consonant any consonant, and letters or whole syllables could be dropped or added. He grouped Veltman with Klassen, Chertkov and Baron Rosen as writers of the same tendency. The literary scholar A. A. Gracheva writes that Mikhail Pogodin saw the mixing of scientific facts with Veltman's own fantasy as a weakness of his method.

Ilovaysky's work drew wider debate. Nikolay Kostomarov called Ilovaysky's conclusions "probabilities", Sergey Solovyov dismissed the Roxolani theory as a guess of the 16th-century chronicler Maciej Stryjkowski, and Vasily Vasilievsky and Pavel Milyukov treated it with irony. The Slavist Vladimir Lamansky wrote that Ilovaysky "disgraces himself" with his works on the Normans, Bulgarians and Huns.

According to the Soviet archaeologist Boris Rybakov, the search for the Slavs' ancestors among the peoples described by Herodotus went back to the 17th century, when it was customary to identify the Scythians with the Slavs. Vsevolod Miller's demonstration in the 19th century that the Scythians belonged to the Iranian language family did away with such straightforward identifications.

=== Later historians ===
Shnirelman describes the founders as driven mainly by "emotional zeal" against what offended their national feelings. He considers them methodologically "rather helpless", with arguments that sound naive to modern specialists, but also "pioneers" whose bold constructions "posed interesting problems and opened new directions of research". In his view their followers, who gave the school its final form, drifted away from mainstream scholarship into "baseless fantasies" guided by an "ethnocentric Slavophile idea", and science soon refuted their identifications. He notes that the Scythians and Sarmatians spoke Iranian languages and that the early Bulgars were Turkic. He credits Dołęga-Chodakowski with laying foundations for Slavic archaeology, ethnography, folklore studies and linguistics. Formozov places Klassen among the authors of "pseudo-scientific writings" of the reign of Nicholas I, whose aim was to justify "preconceived ideas" about the greatness and antiquity of their own people.

Vladimir Petrukhin calls Venelin the "romantic forerunner" of the Slavophiles. He notes that Ilovaysky spelled the Roxolani "Roxalani" to ease the link with Rus', and counted the Huns as Slavs because they too had built an empire. He describes the Roxolani etymology as "old armchair etymology", and its use in place of the chronicle's account of the Varangians as typical of anti-Normanism. The historian S. V. Sokolov traces the derivation of the Russians from the Roxolani to the Renaissance, and counts Lomonosov among the first Russian "Roxolanists".

The historian Anna Viktorovna Pletneva argues that from the early 20th century to the present, critics have mostly avoided direct debate with Ilovaysky's Investigations, relying instead on labels such as "nationalism" and "Great Russian chauvinism" and on the Normanist argument that accepting the Norman theory is "a matter of science" and rejecting it "unscientific". She concludes that Ilovaysky's views on the ancient roots of the Russian people rested on a solid source base and on a long historiographical tradition of treating the Rus' as successors of the Roxolani, and that the Roxolani question is "still far from resolved".

== Legacy ==
According to Pletneva, the derivation of the name Rus' from the Roxolani or the Alans continued to find supporters after Ilovaysky. In 1911 L. V. Padalko derived it from the "Rox-Alans", the white or ruling Alans. In 1943 George Vernadsky held that the name belonged to an Alan clan, the "light As" (Rukhs-As), or Roxolani. In 1974 D. L. Talis argued that a Black Sea Rus' existed from the 8th century in Crimea and the Azov region, and connected it with the Alans. The linguist Oleg Trubachyov, who saw Azov–Black Sea Rus' as a relic of Indo-Aryan tribes, called Ilovaysky's theory "strongly discredited" but held that the origin of the name should be sought there.

In Herodotus's Scythia (1979), in a chapter titled "Skolotoi – Proto-Slavs", Rybakov cited the work of Vasily Abaev and Vladimir Georgiev on a "Scythian period" in the history of Proto-Slavic, marked by many Iranian loanwords. In a 1991 review Petrukhin wrote that Rybakov's studies continued a long-standing "autochthonist" tradition that placed the Proto-Slavs on the middle Dnieper. Rybakov identified the Slavic farmers with Herodotus's Scythian ploughmen and gave the Slavs the self-name of the Iranian-speaking Scythians, Skolotoi. Petrukhin noted that the hypothesis had reached a school textbook.

According to Shnirelman, the creators of the modern "Slavic-Aryan" myth readily took up the school's constructions. In the early 1990s G. S. Belyakova sought to revive the "long-forgotten views of the Slavic school", identified the ancestors of the Slavs with the Scythians, and cited Klassen extensively. The journalist V. Torop insisted on identifying the Slavs with the Cimmerians. In 1991 the neo-pagan journal Volkhv popularised Klassen's theory. The writer V. I. Shcherbakov published a book for senior schoolchildren with the publisher Prosveshcheniye, presenting what Shnirelman calls his "fantastic ideas" about the kinship of the Russians with the Etruscans and Thracians.

Petrukhin describes a revival of traditional anti-Normanism in which works by Ilovaysky and Stepan Gedeonov are reprinted without scholarly commentary. He treats E. S. Galkina's "Russian Khaganate" as a variant of Ilovaysky's "Azov Rus'".

== See also ==
- Book of Veles, a literary forgery presented as an ancient Slavic text
- Gothicism, a Swedish movement that claimed descent from the Goths
- Illyrian movement, a 19th-century pan-South-Slavic movement
- Nationalist historiography
- New chronology (Fomenko), a modern Russian pseudohistorical theory
- Pre-Christian Slavic writing
- Russian-Etruscan pseudohistory
- Venetic theory, a pseudohistorical theory that the Slovenes descend from the Veneti
