= Dmitry Ilovaysky =

Russian historian (1832–1920)

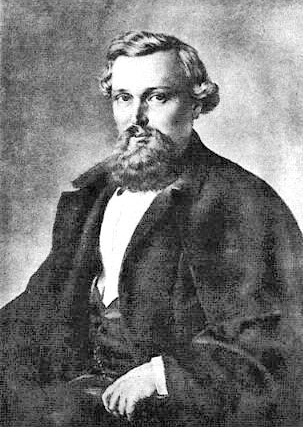
Portrait of Ilovaysky

Dmitry Ivanovich Ilovaysky (Russian: Дмитрий Иванович Иловайский; 11/23 February 1832 – 15 February 1920) was an anti-Normanist conservative Russian historian who penned a number of standard history textbooks.

Born in Ranenburg, Ilovaysky graduated from the Moscow University in 1854 and first attracted critical attention with his thesis on the Principality of Ryazan in 1858. He was wounded during the Siege of Plevna, in which he took an active part.

In the 1870s, Ilovaysky started publishing his extensive overview of Russian history. In his later writings, he expounded a controversial hypothesis of Azov Rus, which was alleged to have been centered on Sarkel and Tmutarakan.

Ilovaysky was the father-in-law of Ivan Tsvetaev, who founded the Pushkin Museum of Fine Arts.

== Views on the origin of Rus' ==
Ilovaysky rejected the Normanist theory of the origin of the Rus' state. He regarded the confusion of the Varangians with the Rus' as the cornerstone of the whole Normanist system, and argued that there was no serious evidence that the Rus' were a foreign people who had arrived from Scandinavia in the 9th century. In his view they were a native, Slavic people.

In Razyskaniya o nachale Rusi (Investigations into the Beginning of Rus', 1876) he traced the Russians and their name to the Roxolani of the ancient sources. He pointed out that Strabo placed the Roxolani on the plains between the Tanais (Don) and the Borysthenes (Dnieper), and that Ptolemy placed them along the whole shore of Lake Maeotis, the Sea of Azov. He held that several Byzantine writers of the 6th and 7th centuries, including Procopius and Maurice, described the same people under the name of the Antes and under the more general names of Scythians and Sarmatians. Developing ideas taken largely from Yuriy Venelin, he also argued that the Huns and the Bulgars were Slavs.

=== Reception ===
Ilovaysky's version did not gain the support of other scholars. According to A. V. Pletneva, his theory was criticised more than once and was mostly rejected or ignored by historians: Mykola Kostomarov called his conclusions mere probabilities, Sergey Solovyov referred to it only as Maciej Stryjkowski's guess about the Roxolani, and Vasily Vasilievsky and Pavel Milyukov treated it with irony. The Slavist Vladimir Lamansky wrote in a letter to his student A. S. Budilovich that Ilovaysky was disgracing himself with his works on the Normans, Bulgarians and Huns without realising it. The Encyclopedia of Ukraine names Ilovaysky, with Stepan Gedeonov and Vasilievsky, among the authors of the first serious critiques of the Normanist theory, while noting that they failed to present well-substantiated alternatives.
