= Tale of Mosoch =

17th century Russian legend chronicle

Tale of Mosoch is a 17th century Russian legendary story. It tells the story of Mosoch, the grandson of Noah and son of Japheth (the biblical Meshech), who, according to the tale, gave rise to the “Muscovites” on the banks of the Moskva River, named after him, immediately after the Tower of Babel. The tale is fantastical in character. The work is similar in conception to The Legend of Sloven and Rus, which was created during the same period.

== Origin ==
According to the Latin version of the letter of Alexander the Great to the Slavs, a popular falsification in Slavic countries, the “privilege” was granted to the “race of the Slavs (genti Slavorum) or Moschi” — the “glorious Russian lineage” (glorioso stemmati Ruthico), whose authority extended from the Varangian Sea to the Caspian. Three leaders of the Moschi bear names inconsistent with Slavic anthroponymy: Velikosan, Hasan, and Hauassan. An introductory note to the “privilege” states that it was “extracted from the handwritten annals of these same Moschi.” The Moschi had been known in Armenia since the time of Strabo. In the Middle Ages, they were associated with the biblical descendant of Japheth, Mosoch, and with the inhabitants of the Muscovite state. For this reason, these constructions attracted the interest of Russian scribes as early as the 17th century.

The reorientation of Alexander’s gift from the Slavic world as a whole to the Moscow lands indicates the Russian origins of the Latin text. According to the hypothesis of A. S. Mylnikov, the text was composed in Latin by Sebastian Glavinić, who visited the Russian state as part of an Austrian embassy and prepared a “Report on Muscovy and the Muscovites” (around 1665). In the Russian chronicle tradition, a similar text has survived as part of the Mazurin Chronicle of the last quarter of the 17th century, which defined the limits of the authority of Russian princes “from the Varangian Sea even to the Khvalynian Sea.” This corresponds to the oldest geographical nomenclature of the Primary Chronicle, in which the Caspian Sea is called the Khvalynian Sea.

Historiography of the 16th–17th centuries identified the biblical Mosoch with Moscow. and Toval (Tobal, Phubal) with Tobolsk. A large number of literary legends were already synthesized in the chronicle of Maciej Stryjkowski (1582), according to which a certain Rus, presented as the ancestral eponym of the Russians, was named as the brother or descendant of Lech, the eponym of the Poles, and Czech; their common forefather was Mosoch, son of Japheth. However, in this work Mosoch was not identified with Moscow, since such an identification would imply the idea of the superiority of the Muscovite state over Poland.

The Gustyn Chronicle, a Ukrainian chronicle of the early 17th century, in its account of the origin of the Slavic people, relies primarily on the southern, Balkan prehistory of the Slavs or Rus'. Here the Slavs are traced back to the biblical Mosoch — Moscow — from whom “all the Sarmatians, Rus', Poles, Czechs, and Bulgarians” derive their lineage. According to the chronicle, the Slavs originated from the mixing of the descendants of Mosoch with the descendants of Riphath, son of Gomer and grandson of Japheth. Like the works of Polish historiographers, the biblical genealogy is combined with the late antique Latin tradition according to which the ancestors of the Slavs were the Veneti / Venedi. The ancient Eneti were associated with the Veneti; Homer mentioned them as allies of the Trojans. From Troy they withdrew to Balkan Illyricum and then to the Venetian Sea, where they founded the city of Enetia / Venice. They also settled the northern Black Sea region, where they acquired the names Sarmatians or Alans after their commander “Alyan.” The chronicler directly identifies Western Slavic sources for his account of the Eneti, ancestors of the Slavs, calling those who settled in the Black Sea region “Roxolani, as if Rus and Alans.” The Balkan history of the Slavs is given particular significance in the Gustyn Chronicle: according to the work, the Slavs collected tribute from the Macedonians themselves, giving the “gift of Alexander” a “historical” justification. The Letter of Alexander the Great to the Slavs in the Gustyn Chronicle derives from the text of the Polish Chronicle of Marcin Bielski.

The 17th-century Tale of Mosoch was composed by a learned historian who constructed the origin of the “Muscovite state” from Mosoch, supposedly relying on scholarly evidence. The author was a nachёtnik — a reader and compiler who used his knowledge to construct a fantastic narrative in the spirit of early modern myths — and was also, to some extent, a hoaxer. The title of the tale in a number of chronographs states that it was compiled “from two Polish chronicles, which were attested by Greek, Czech, and Hungarian chronicles.” References to “many chronicles” of Poland and Hungary also occur in the text, where Xenophon and a certain ancient “Roman scribe” are mentioned. In reality, the sources of the tale are found among Polish writings that developed the Sarmatian theory. Thus, A. N. Popov pointed out that the “sheet” (letter) of Alexander the Great — in a different recension from that included in the Tale of Slovene and Rus — with a reference to the Czech chronicle, was quoted from the Chronicle of Marcin Bielski.

== Content ==
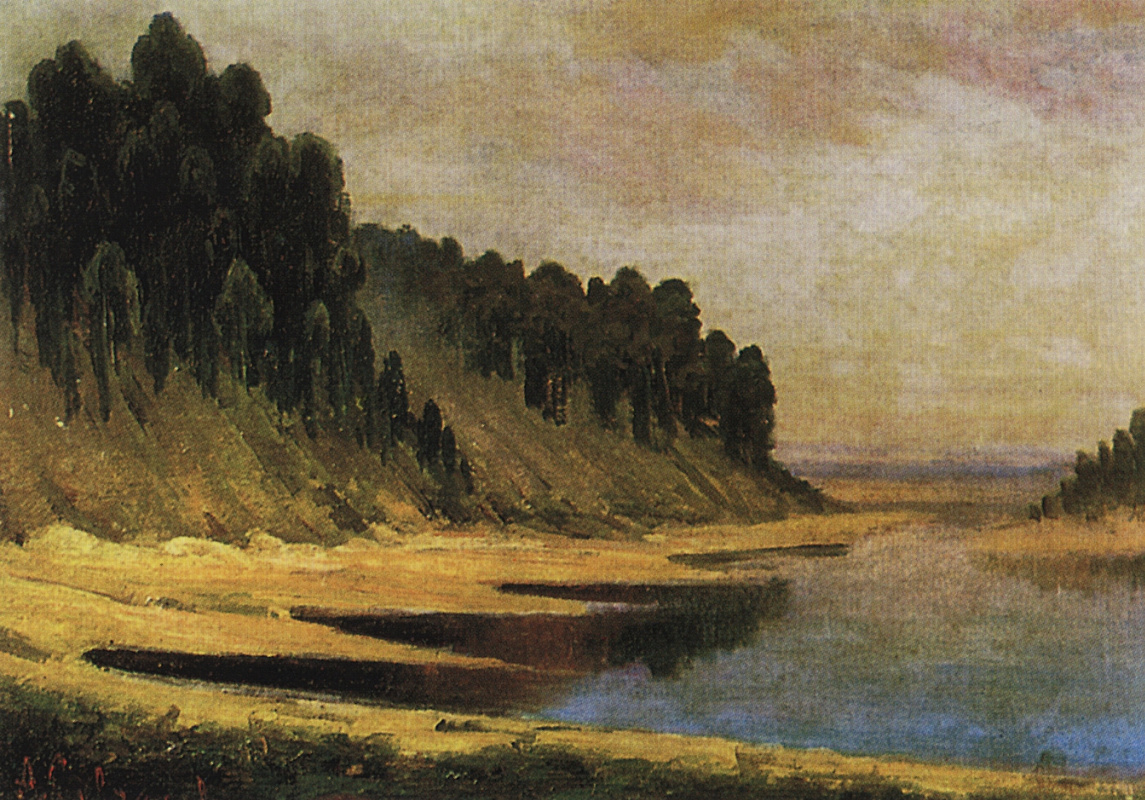
Wooded bank of the Moskva River, study for the painting Landscape with a River and a Fisherman, Alexey Savrasov, 1859

According to the tale, Mosoch was the “sixth son of Japheth, grandson of Noah,” who “departed from Babylon with his tribe.” He stopped at a river that was named the Moskva after him, and “begot the Muscovites from his name.” The descendants of these “Muscovites” destroyed Troy. They founded Venice. They became the first inhabitants of the “Roman region,” the Etruscans, whose Russian language subsequently became ‘corrupted’. They captured Philip, father of Alexander the Great. They conquered Rome and became its rulers even before the Goths and others came to Rome. Although “the single Muscovite people” populated almost all of Europe, this was “though with different names, yet all one Muscovite people”; “the true pillar of the Slavic language is in the Moscow land”.

== Dissemination and influence ==
The author of the Tale of Mosoch “attached” fictional heroes and events to the framework of historical works that circulated in the West and were well known in Russia, which prompted learned scribes to verify his information. The Tale of Slovene and Rus did not have these disadvantages. This Novgorodian tale was never subjected to criticism in its own era, unlike the no less fantastical Tale of Mosoch. Moscow and provincial authors, who regarded Moscow as the center of the world, yielded primacy in Russian history to Novgorod, although they possessed the tale of Noah’s grandson Mosoch, who begot the “Muscovites” on the banks of the Moskva River, named after him, immediately after the Tower of Babel.

The patriarchal chroniclers included the Tale of Mosoch and the Tale of Slovene and Rus in the Russian Chronograph of the third class, third recension, compiled at the court of Patriarch Joachim and disseminated throughout the country in a large number of copies. The presence of these two tales was called the most notable feature of the work by A. N. Popov. Different recensions of the Russian Chronograph, along with the Book of Royal Degrees, were the principal historical reading collections.

The Synopsis of 1674 by Archimandrite Innocentius Gisel, of the Kyiv Pechersk Lavra, included the Tale of Slovene and Rus and the Tale of Mosoch in a distinctive retelling. This mass-circulation publication had a notable influence on contemporary readers and the scribal milieu, which readily combined the scarcely compatible histories of the two tales. The Synopsis uses the “letter of Alexander” and calls Mosoch the “progenitor of the Slaveno-Russian people”.

The Synopsis acquired great importance for later Russian historiography. Innocentius Gisel adopted the Polish tradition that traced the Slavs to the Sarmatians, with constructions concerning the “people of the Roxolani” — the Slaveno-Russian people. The progenitor of the Slaveno-Russian — Muscovite people (the forefather of “all Rus'”) — was the biblical Mosoch. The constructions concerning Roxolan and Mosoch were borrowed from Polish historiography; Gisel also used the Gustyn Chronicle. These constructions are incoherent and contradictory: Poland claimed all of “Sarmatia” from the Baltic to the Black Sea, while the Muscovite state claimed the territory of Eastern Europe. Moscow’s claim consisted in its aspiration to be the ancient center of the Slavic world.

The compiler of the draft autograph of the Novgorod Zabelin Chronicle, created in the 1670s–1680s, borrowed the Tale of Slovene and Rus from the early (Novgorodian) recension of the Patriarchal Compilation of 1652, while he read the Tale of Mosoch, making references to it, in the text of the Synopsis. He reproached the author of the Synopsis for mixing “reliable” information about Slovene and Rus with the supposedly unreliable Tale of Mosoch. The chronicler’s motivation was not merely local patriotism. Because of its content, the Tale of Mosoch provided more grounds for doubt than the Tale of Slovene and Rus.

The learned Novgorodian Isidor Snazin integrated elements of the Tale of Mosoch into the Tale of Slovene and Rus. In December 1682 he completed his Mazurin Chronicle. Snazin divided the Tale of Slovene and Rus into chronicle entries and revised the content as follows. The year 2242 from the biblical date of creation — the Great Flood; 2244 — Japheth received from Noah the western and northern lands, and “after a short time” his great-grandsons Scythus and Kazardan founded Great Scythia. At the same time, Mosoch, the sixth son of Japheth, departed from Babylon with his tribe and in 2373 (3135 BC) arrived in the region north of the Black and Azov Seas, where he “begot the Muscovites.” The “Muscovites” were the Scythians, who in 3099 (2409 BC) set out in search of new lands under the princes Slovene and Rus. Snazin’s elaborate composition did not become popular and survives in only one manuscript.

The Tale of Mosoch was less popular than the Tale of Slovene and Rus, but from time to time it was incorporated, at least in abridged form or through references, into scholarly historical works. Thus, it was included in the abridged recension of the Patriarchal Chronicle Compilation of the 1680s and in the Chronograph of the Chudov Monastery hieromonk Bogolep Adamov of 1688, which was based on that chronicle.

At the end of the 17th century, Timofey Kamenovich-Rvovsky, a hierodeacon of the Kholopy Monastery on the Mologa, composed various texts on the basis of the Tale of Slovene and Rus and the Tale of Mosoch. In his widely known Chronicle from the Creation of the World, which some authors consider to be the Joachim Chronicle or a reflection of it, the Tale of Slovene and Rus replaces the ancient history up to Emperor Claudius, in comparison with the “chronicle of the kings” that he used. Timofey incorporated the account of Mosoch into another chronicle under the heading “On the Beginning of the Reign of the Great City of Moscow, How It Was First Founded.” On 6 August 1684, Timofey began the Book Called Greek and Greco-Slavic History with the Tale of Slovene and Rus, followed by the Brief Chronicle of the Lineage of the Russian People. He combined both tales in another work, widely known since the time of Nikolay Karamzin, the 1699 Historical and Ancient Description and Tale for the Instruction of All: On the Beginning of the Lineages of the Muscovite Lineage and the Great Slaveno-Russian People, and on Their Renaming, and on the Foundation of Their Great Cities, the Reigning and First City of Moscow and the Second and Ancient Great Novgorod. The author shifted toward Moscow-centrism, placing Moscow of Mosoch first and Novgorod, the Great Slovensk of Slovene and Rus, second.

Timofey wrote: “Then came Mosoch the Japhethite, sixth son of Japheth, our lord and first prince, into the great Scythian land and this our land, so previously named, to the place of this Moscow settlement, on the very land where we now dwell… This river, which at first was without a name, he, Prince Mosoch, after his coming and settling in this beautiful and beloved place, renamed after himself Mosoch, the prince, after the name of himself and his beautiful and beloved wife, the princess called Ku. And thus, by the common joining together of their names, Prince Mosa and his red-haired princess Ku, it was named… This Mosoch, Prince of Moscow, became our forefather and first father, not only of the Scytho-Muscovite-Slaveno-Russian people, but also of all our numerous kindred states…” In the same passage Timofey asserted that the Yauza River had been named by Mosoch after his son Ya and daughter Vuza.

The famous writer and enlightener Dimitry of Rostov knew both tales, but in his work Chronicle Relating the Deeds from the Beginning of the World to the Nativity of Christ he used only the Tale of Slovene and Rus. The latter was incorporated in its entirety into the Petrine official text Detailed Chronicle from the Beginning of Russia to the Battle of Poltava, in which only a short passage from the Tale of Mosoch is given concerning the naming of the “Muscovite people and imperial city” after him.

Mikhail Lomonosov supported the Scythian-Sarmatian hypothesis of the origin of the Slavs. Like medieval historiographers, he sought to combine the ancient scholarly tradition with the biblical genealogy of peoples. Lomonosov, following Polish historiographers, traced the European Slavs-Veneti (Sarmatians) back to the Eneti, who had participated in the Trojan War in Asia. This construction facilitated the identification of the latter with the Moschi of Strabo and with the biblical Mosoch.

The Swedish diplomat Petrus Petrejus (1615) declared the Grand Prince of Moscow, Sweden’s rival, to be a descendant of the “abominable and cruel” Mosoch. Petrejus identified Muscovy with Mosoch: “abominable and cruel in manners and habits, as well as in his coarse and detestable deeds.” Mosoch settled “between the rivers Tanais, Borysthenes, Volga and Moskva, where his descendants still live today”.

== Criticism ==
In 1725, the Orientalist academician Gottlieb Siegfried Bayer conducted a critical study of sources concerning the history of Rus and Russia. Examining traditional Russian historiography, he showed that late medieval chronography had replaced a historical-geographical approach with a genealogical one. Peoples who had inhabited the territory of Russia in antiquity — the Scythians and Sarmatians — were represented as ancestors of the Slavs. This construction relied on biblical genealogy, according to which a number of peoples descended from Mosoch, a descendant of Japheth, whose name traditional historiography associated with the name of Moscow.

Researchers of biblical texts drew attention to the obscurity of the associations between Mosoch and Moscow: in biblical texts, Mosoch / Meshech was associated with a barbarian people. King David lamented in Psalm 119 (5): “Woe is me, that I dwell in Meshech, that I live among the tents of Kedar”.

== Sources ==
=== Text editions ===
Innocent Gisel, archim. Synopsis, or Brief Collection from Various Chroniclers. — Kyiv: Printing House of the Kyiv Pechersk Lavra, 1680. — 224 leaves. The tale was published according to a manuscript of the Joachim recension of the Chronograph from the late 17th century: RSL. Fund 256. N. P. Rumyantsev Collection. No. 458. Folios 468–470: Collected and published by A. Popov, ed. (1869). Collection of Slavic and Russian Works and Articles Included in Chronographs of the Russian Recension. Moscow: A. I. Mamontov and Co. Printing House. pp. 438–442. Complete Collection of Russian Chronicles. — Moscow: Nauka, 1969. — Vol. 31. — 262 pp.

=== Studies ===
- Bogdanov A. P. (2022). "The Power of Legend: The Tale of Slovene and Rus in the General Russian Chronicles of the 17th Century". Studia Litterarum (1): 184–201.
- Dudakov S. Yu. (1993). The History of One Myth: Essays on Russian Literature of the 19th–20th Centuries. Moscow: Nauka. p. 282. ISBN 5-02-009738-1.
- Karnaukhov D. V. (2000). "The Mythologeme of the Origin of the Eastern Slavs in the Interpretation of the Polish Educated Elite of the 16th Century". Vestnik Evrazii (3).
- Mylnikov A. S. (1996). The Picture of the Slavic World: A View from Eastern Europe. Ethnogenetic Legends, Conjectures, and Proto-Hypotheses of the 16th to Early 18th Centuries. Saint Petersburg.
- Petrukhin V. Ya. (2014). Rus in the 9th–10th Centuries: From the Calling of the Varangians to the Choice of Faith.
- Popov A. N. Overview of Chronographs of the Russian Recension. — Moscow: A. I. Mamontov and Co. Printing House, 1866. — Vol. 2. — 293 pp.
