= Letters of Alexander the Great =

Letters written by and to Alexander the Great

Little from the letters written by and to Alexander the Great is preserved today, and much of what purports to be his correspondence is in fact fictitious. The autograph manuscripts are all lost. Only a few official letters addressed to the Greek cities survive because they were inscribed on stone, although some of these are official instructions (writs) and not true letters. The content of others is sometimes reported in historical sources, such as Diodorus Siculus, Arrian and Plutarch, but only occasionally do these sources seem to quote such letters. Only a small fraction of Alexander's correspondence is thus accessible today, and even less of his actual words.

An archive of correspondence was maintained at Alexander's headquarters. Its ultimate fate is unknown, but Plutarch reports in his biography of Eumenes that after Alexander burned down Eumenes' tent, "he wrote to the satraps and strategoi [i.e., governors] everywhere telling them to send copies of the destroyed documents and ordered Eumenes to take them all in." The letter of Alexander to Chios is preserved on stone, as is his edict to Priene, sometimes regarded as a letter. Plutarch cites 31 letters written by or to Alexander. He accepts them as genuine, but modern scholarship is divided. The general opinion has been to assess the purported letters on a case-by-case basis, recognizing that some are forged.

The several letters attributed to Alexander in the Alexander Romance cannot be taken at face value and certainly do not represent the original form or words of any actual letters that might lie behind them. Among the literary creations of the Romance are Alexander's correspondence with his mother, Olympias; the Persian king, Darius III; his tutor, Aristotle; the city of Athens; the Kandake, an African queen; and the legendary Amazons. A letter to Olympias, corresponding to that in the Romance, is also mentioned in Arrian. The apocryphal letter to Aristotle on India circulated independently and widely, being translated into many languages and accepted as authentic throughout the Middle Ages. The correspondence with Dandamis is likewise apocryphal. The letter to the Slavs is a late medieval forgery.
