= Anti-Normanism =

Historical revisionist theory

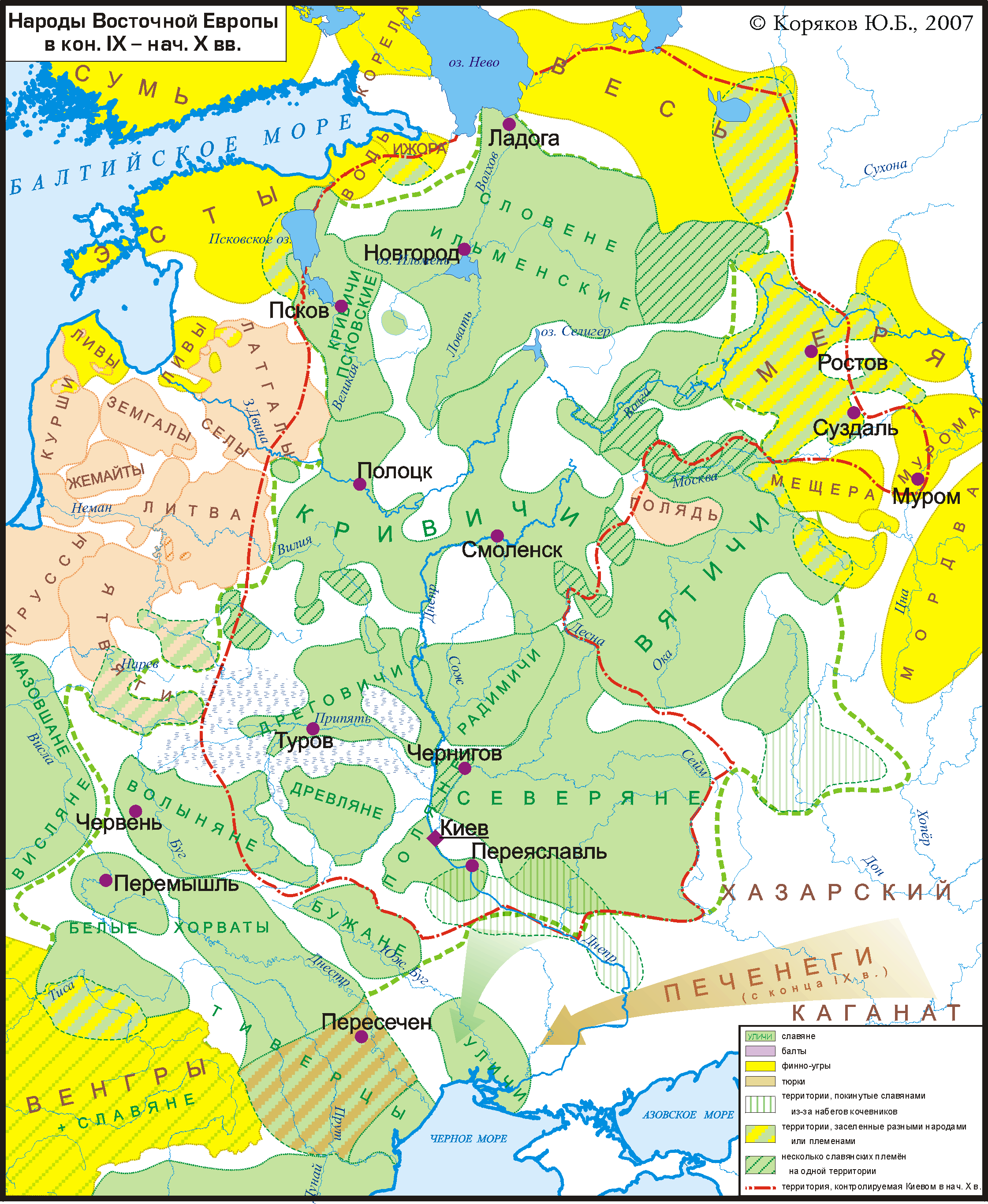
Ethnic groups in Eastern Europe in the late 9th-century and early 10th-century. Green represents Slavic tribes, orange represents Baltic tribes, and yellow represents Finno-Ugric tribes.

The approximate extent of Old Norse and related languages in the early 10th century: Old West Norse dialect Old East Norse dialect Old Gutnish dialect Old English Crimean Gothic Other Germanic languages with which Old Norse still retained some mutual intelligibility

Normanism and anti-Normanism are competing groups of theories about the origin of Kievan Rus' that emerged in the 18th and 19th centuries concerning the narrative of the Viking Age in Eastern Europe. At the centre of the disagreement is the origin of the Varangian Rus', a people who travelled across and settled in Eastern Europe in the 8th and 9th centuries, and are considered by most modern historians to be of Scandinavian origin who eventually assimilated with the Slavs. The Normanist theory has been firmly established as mainstream, and modern anti-Normanism is viewed as historical revisionism.

The origin of Kievan Rus' is notoriously contentious, and relates to its perceived importance for the legitimation of nation-building, imperialism, and independence movements within the East Slavic-speaking world, and for legitimating different political relationships between eastern and western European countries. The Norsemen that ventured from what is now Sweden into the waterways of Eastern Europe feature prominently in the history of the Baltic states, Scandinavia, Poland, and the Byzantine Empire. They are particularly important in the historiography and cultural history of Belarus, Russia and Ukraine, but have also featured in the history of Poland. Contention has centred around whether the development of Kievan Rus' was influenced by non-Slavic Varangians (this idea is characterised as the "Normanist theory"), or whether the people of Kievan Rus' emerged solely from autochthonous Slavic political development (known as the "anti-Normanist theory"), including some other anti-Normanist and skeptical theories stemming from the scarcity of contemporary evidence for the emergence of Kievan Rus', and the great ethnic diversity and complexity of the wide area where these Norsemen were active.

== Mainstream view: Normanism ==
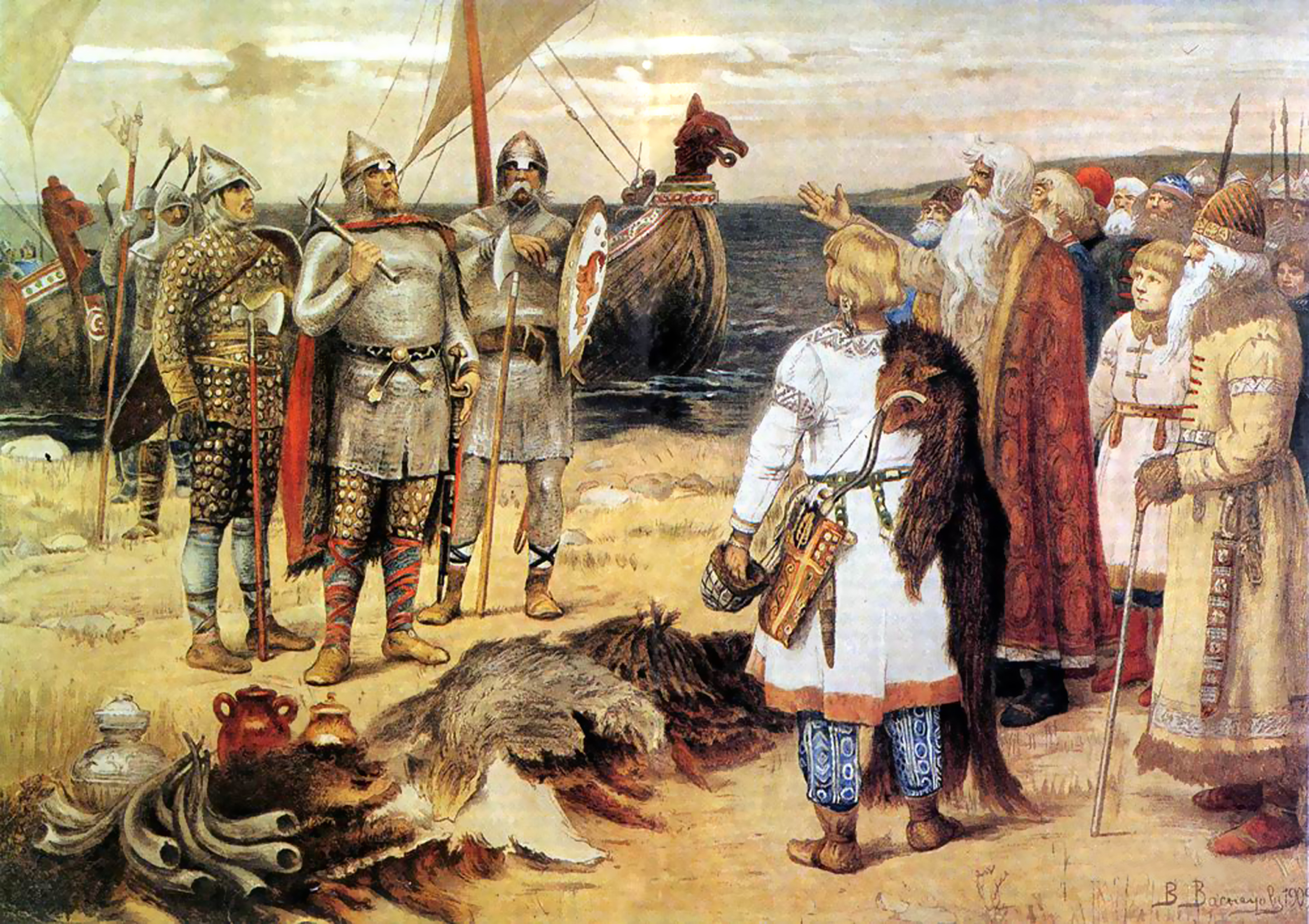
The Invitation of the Varangians by Viktor Vasnetsov: Rurik and his brothers Sineus and Truvor arrive at the lands of Ilmen Slavs.

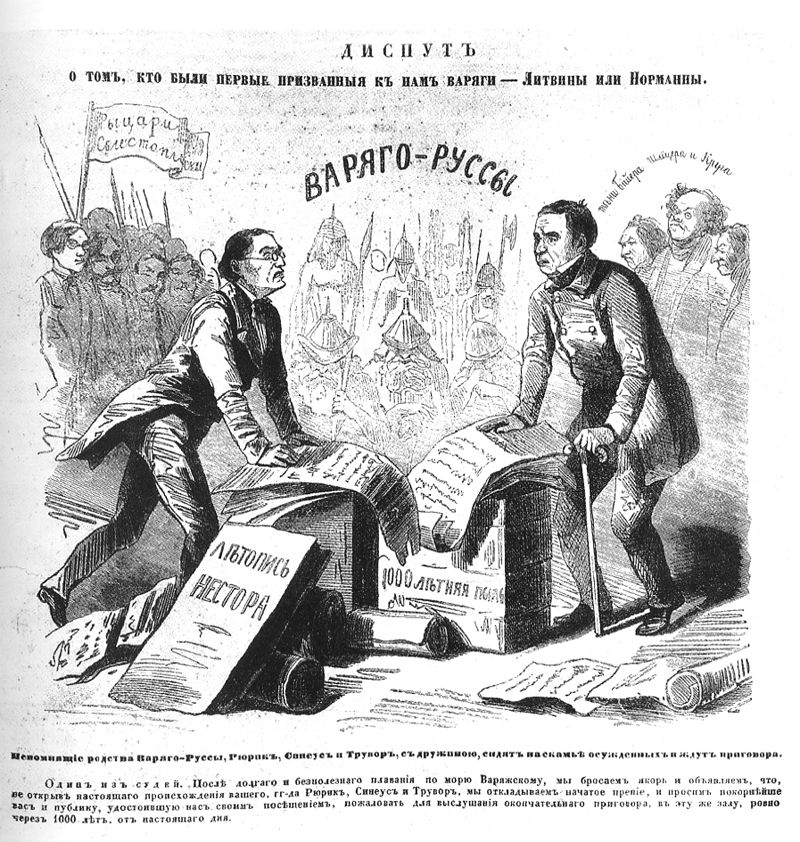
A caricature of the disagreement between Nikolay Kostomarov and Mikhail Pogodin on the issue of whom were Varangians (Litvins or Normans)

While the term "Normans" in English usually refers to the Scandinavian-descended ruling dynasty of Normandy in France from the 10th century onwards, and their scions elsewhere in Western Europe, in the context of the Rus' people, "Normanism" is the idea that the Rus' had their origins among the Normans (i.e. among "Northmen"). The term "Normanism" was used to cover a range of opinions about the degree of influence of the Varangians in the early history of Kievan Rus. The idea that Varangians founded Rus was seen as politically unacceptable by many Russian historians. Nevertheless, the close connection of Rus' with Scandinavians is confirmed by archaeological evidence for extensive Scandinavian settlement in Russia and Ukraine.

=== Early scholarship ===
Modern studies of the Rus' began when the German historian Gerhardt Friedrich Müller (1705–1783) was invited to work in the Russian Academy of Sciences in 1725. Müller presented research made by his predecessor Gottlieb-Siegfried Bayer in the papers De Varagis ("On the Varangians", 1729) and Origines russicae ("Russian origins", 1736), and on the Primary Chronicle, written in the 12th century, and covering the years 852 to 1110. At the beginning of an important speech in 1749, later published as Origines gentis et nominis Russorum ("The Origins of the People and the Name of the Russians"), Müller argued that the Rurikid dynasty descended from ethnically Scandinavian Varangians and that the term "Russia" originated from Old Norse. This statement caused such uproar in his Russian audience that he was unable to finish his presentation, and appeals to the president of the academy and the Empress led to the formation of a committee to determine if his research was "harmful to the interests and glory of the Russian Empire". Before the committee, scathing criticism from Lomonosov, Krasheninnikov, and other Russian historians led to Müller being forced to suspend his work on the issue until Lomonosov's death. It was even thought during the 20th century that much of his research was destroyed, but recent research suggests that this is not the case: Müller managed to rework it and had it reprinted as Origines Rossicae in 1768.

Despite the negative reception in the mid-18th century, by the end of the century, Müller's views were the consensus in Russian historiography, and this remained largely the case through the 19th century and early 20th centuries. Russian historians who accepted this historical account included Nikolai Karamzin (1766–1826) and his disciple Mikhail Pogodin (1800–1875), who gave credit to the claims of the Primary Chronicle that the Varangians were invited by East Slavs to rule over them and bring order.

The theory was not without political implications. For some, it fitted with embracing and celebrating the multiethnic character of the Russian Empire. However, it was also consistent with the racial theory widespread at the time that Germanics (and their descendants) were naturally suited to government, whereas Slavs were not. According to Karamzin, the Norse migration formed the basis and justification for Russian autocracy (as opposed to anarchy of the pre-Rurikid period), and Pogodin used the theory to advance his view that Russia was immune to social upheavals and revolutions, because the Russian state originated from a voluntary treaty between the people of Novgorod and Varangian rulers. The German-born Moscow academician August Ludwig von Schlözer said in 1802 that the Slavs had been living like "savage beasts and birds" before the advent of the civilizing Norsemen, a view later adopted by several scholars as well as non-scholars such as Adolf Hitler in the 20th-century, who saw in Russia "a wonderful instance of the state-organizing capability of the Germans among an inferior race".

=== Emergence of Western scholarly consensus ===
During the historical debates of the 20th century, the key evidence for the mainstream view that Scandinavian migrants had an important role in the formation of Kievan Rus' emerged as the following:

- Notwithstanding other suggestions, the name Rus' can readily be interpreted as originating in Old Norse.
- The personal names of the first few Rus' leaders are etymologically Old Norse, from Rurik (from Old Norse "Hrærekr") down to Olga of Kiev (from Old Norse "Helga"). Starting with Olga's son Sviatoslav I of Kiev onwards, Slavic names take over.
- The list of cataracts on the Dnieper listed by Constantine VII in his De Administrando Imperio as belonging to the language of the Rhos can most readily be etymologised as Old Norse.
- Runic inscriptions from towns and settlements indicate Scandinavian presence.
- The Annals of St. Bertin account of the Rhos for 839 has them identify themselves as sueoni (Swedes).
- 13th-century Icelandic historiography portrays close connections between the 11th-century rulers of Rus' and Scandinavian dynasties in England and Norway.

In the 21st century, analyses of the rapidly growing range of archaeological evidence further noted that high-status 9th- to 10th-century burials of both men and women in the vicinity of the Upper Volga exhibit material culture largely consistent with that of Scandinavia (though this is less the case away from the river, or further downstream). This has been seen as further demonstrating the Scandinavian character of elites in Old Rus'.

It is also agreed, however, that ancestrally Scandinavian Rus' aristocrats, like Scandinavians elsewhere, swiftly assimilated culturally to a Slavic identity: in the words of F. Donald Logan, "in 839, the Rus were Swedes; in 1043 the Rus were Slavs". This relatively fast integration is noteworthy, and the processes of cultural assimilation in Rus' are an important area of research.

The old Normanist assumption was that the Scandinavians introduced civilization to their Slavic subjects, but the number of Norsemen was relatively small compared to the number of Slavs and non-Slavs. In addition, the Norsemen married local women, had their weapons made by Slavs, and only a relatively small number of Norse loanwords in Russian have been established. In general, the Norsemen absorbed culture in Russia and down the Volga.

There is uncertainty as to how large the Scandinavian migration to Rus' was, but some archaeological work in the years around 2000 argued for a substantial number of free farmers settling in the upper Volga region.

== Anti-Normanism ==
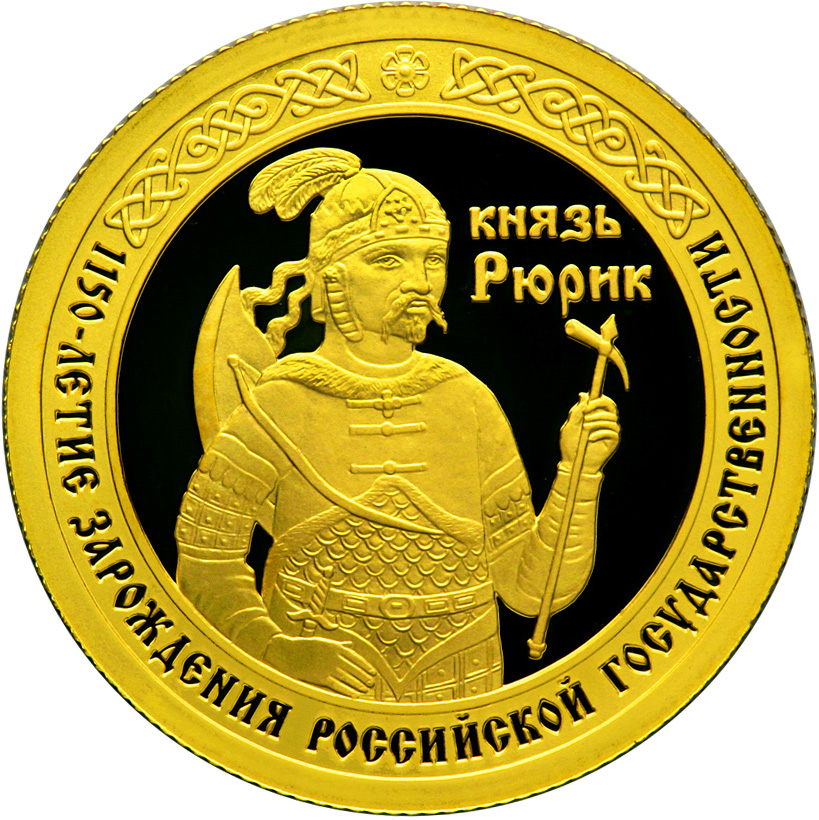
Golden rouble depicting Rurik, issued to mark the 1150th anniversary of the birth of the Russian state.

Proponents of anti-Normanism are of the opinion that a state was founded by the Slavs even before the vocation of Rurik. Starting with Mikhail Lomonosov (1711–1765), Slavophilic scholars have criticised the idea of Norse invaders. By the early 20th century, the traditional anti-Normanist doctrine (as articulated by Dmitry Ilovaisky) seemed to have lost currency. Russian and then Soviet historians began to downplay the idea of Scandinavian influence in early Russian history. The anti-Normanist arguments were revived and adopted in official Soviet historiography, partly in response to Nazi propaganda, which posited that Russia owed its existence to a Germanic ruling elite. Mikhail Artamonov ranks among those who attempted to reconcile both theories by hypothesizing that the Kievan state united the southern Rus' (of Slavic stock) and the northern Rus' (of Germanic stock) into a single nation.

In light of evidence, theories – most of them proposed by Soviet scholars with nationalistic agendas – of a Slav state in the Baltic region attacked by and ultimately absorbing Viking invaders are more likely the product of wishful thinking than of fact.

— Waldman, & Mason 2005, p. 668

The staunchest advocate of the anti-Normanist views in the period following the Second World War was Boris Rybakov, who argued that the cultural level of the Varangians could not have warranted an invitation from the culturally advanced Slavs. This conclusion leads Slavicists to deny the Primary Chronicle, which writes that the Varangian Rus' were invited by the native Slavs. Rybakov assumed that Nestor, putative author of the Chronicle, was biased against the pro-Greek party of Vladimir Monomakh and supported the pro-Scandinavian party of the ruling prince Svyatopolk. He cites Nestor as a pro-Scandinavian manipulator and compares his account of Rurik's invitation with numerous similar stories found in folklore around the world.

By the 21st century, most professional scholars, in both Anglophone and Slavic-language scholarship, had reached a consensus that the origins of the Rus' people lay in Scandinavia and that this originally Scandinavian elite had a significant role in forming the polity of Kievan Rus'. Indeed, in 1995, the Russian archaeologist Leo Klejn "gave a paper entitled 'The End of the Discussion', in the belief that anti-Normanism 'was dead and buried'". However, Klejn soon had to revise this opinion as anti-Normanist ideas gained a new prominence in both public and academic discourse in Russia, Ukraine, and Belarus. Anglophone scholarship has identified the continued commitment to anti-Normanism in these countries since the collapse of the Soviet Union as being motivated by present-day ethno-nationalism and state-formation. One prominent Russian example occurred with an anti-Normanist conference in 2002, which was followed by publications on the same theme, and which appears to have been promoted by Russian government policy of the time. Accordingly, anti-Normanist accounts are prominent in some 21st century Russian school textbooks. Meanwhile, in Ukraine and to a lesser extent Belarus, post-Soviet nation-building opposed to a history of Russian imperialism has promoted anti-Normanist views in academia and, to a greater extent, popular culture.

== Other views ==
The controversies over the nature of the Rus and the origins of the Russian state have bedevilled Viking studies, and indeed Russian history, for well over a century. It is historically certain that the Rus were Swedes. The evidence is incontrovertible, and that a debate still lingers at some levels of historical writing is clear evidence of the holding power of received notions. The debate over this issue – futile, embittered, tendentious, doctrinaire – served to obscure the most serious and genuine historical problem which remains: the assimilation of these Viking Rus into the Slavic people among whom they lived. The principal historical question is not whether the Rus were Scandinavians or Slavs, but, rather, how quickly these Scandinavian Rus became absorbed into Slavic life and culture.

— F. Donald Logan

There are some Anglophone scholars who remain skeptical about the origin of Rus', however, either because the evidence is not good enough, or because they remain uncertain whether Rus' was an ethnic group with a clear point of origin.

Scholars such as Omeljan Pritsak and Horace G. Lunt offer explanations that go beyond simplistic attempts to attribute "ethnicity" on first glance interpretation of literary, philological, and archaeological evidence. They view the Rus' as disparate, and often mutually antagonistic, clans of charismatic warriors and traders who formed wide-ranging networks across the North and Baltic Seas. They were a "multi-ethnic, multilingual and non-territorial community of sea nomads and trading settlements" that contained numerous Norsemen—but equally Slavs, Balts, and Finns.

Tolochko argues "the story of the royal clan's journey is a device with its own function within the narrative of the chronicle. ... Yet if we take it for what it actually is, if we accept that it is not a documentary ethnographic description of the 10th century, but a medieval origo gentis (Note: Founding myth) masterfully constructed by a Christian cleric of the early 12th century, then we have to reconsider the established scholarly narrative of the earliest phase of East European history, which owes so much to the Primary Chronicle".

Archaeological research, synthesizing a wide range of 20th-century excavations, has begun to develop what Jonathan Shepard has called a "bottom up" vision of the formation of the Rus' polity, in which, during the ninth and 10th century increasingly intensive trade networks criss-crossed linguistically and ethnically diverse groups around rivers like the Volga, the Don, the Dnieper. This may have produced "an essentially voluntary convergence of groupings in common pursuit of primary produce exchangeable for artefacts from afar". This fits well with the image of Rus' that dominates the Arabic sources, focusing further south and east, around the Black and Caspian Seas, the Caucasus and the Volga Bulgars. Yet this narrative, though plausible, contends with the "top-down" image of state development implied by the Primary Chronicle, archaeological assemblages indicating Scandinavian-style weapon-bearing elites on the Upper Volga, and evidence for slave-trading and violent destruction of fortified settlements.

Numerous artefacts of Scandinavian affinity have been found in northern Russia (as well as artefacts of Slavic origin in Sweden). However, exchange between the north and southern shores of the Baltic had occurred since the Iron Age (albeit limited to immediately coastal areas). Northern Russia and adjacent Finnic lands had become a profitable meeting ground for peoples of diverse origins, especially for the trade of furs, and attracted by the presence of oriental silver from the mid-8th century AD. There is an undeniable presence of goods and people of Scandinavian origin; however, the predominant people remained the local (Baltic and Finnic) peoples.

The increasing volume of trade and internal competition necessitated higher forms of organization. The Rus' appeared to emulate aspects of Khazar political organization—hence the mention of a Rus' chaganus in the Carolingian court in 839 (Royal Frankish Annals). Legitimization was sought by way of adopting a Christian and linguistically Slavic "high culture" that became the "Kievan Rus'". Moreover, there is doubt if the emerging Kievan Rus' were the same clan as the "Rus" who visited the Carolingians in 839 or who attacked Constantinople in 860 AD.

The rise of Kiev itself is mysterious. Devoid of any silver dirham finds in the 8th century AD, it was situated west of the profitable fur and silver trade networks that spanned from the Baltic to the Muslim lands, via the Volga–Kama basins. At the prime hill in Kiev, fortifications and other symbols of consolidation and power appear from the 9th century, thus preceding the literary appearance of "Rus" in the middle Dnieper region. By the 10th century, the lowlands around Kiev had extensive "Slavic" styled settlements, and there is evidence of growing trade with the Byzantine lands. This might have attracted Rus' movements, and a shift in power, from the north to Kiev. Tolochko argues that Kiev did not evolve from the infrastructure of the Scandinavian trade networks, but rather it forcibly took them over, with the destruction of numerous earlier trade settlements in the north, including the famous Staraya Ladoga.

== See also ==
- Indigenous Aryans
- Litvinism
- Macedonia naming dispute
- Russian nationalism
- Tartarian Empire
- Venetic theory

== Bibliography ==
- The Annals of Saint-Bertin, transl. Janet L. Nelson, Ninth-Century Histories 1 (Manchester and New York, 1991).
- Davies, Norman. Europe: A History. New York: Oxford University Press, 1996.
- Bury, John Bagnell; Gwatkin, Henry Melvill (1936). The Cambridge Medieval History, Volume 3. University Press. ISBN 0415327563. Archived from the original on 10 August 2023.
- Christian, David. A History of Russia, Mongolia, and Central Asia. Blackwell, 1999.
- Danylenko, Andrii. "The name Rus': In search of a new dimension." Jahrbueher fuer Geschichte Osteuropas 52 (2004), 1–32.
- Davidson, H.R. Ellis, The Viking Road to Byzantium. Allen & Unwin, 1976.
- Dolukhanov, Pavel M. The Early Slavs: Eastern Europe from the Initial Settlement to the Kievan Rus. New York: Longman, 1996.
- Duczko, Wladyslaw. Viking Rus: Studies on the Presence of Scandinavians in Eastern Europe Archived 10 August 2023 at the Wayback Machine (The Northern World; 12). Leiden: Brill Academic Publishers, 2004 (hardcover, ISBN 90-04-13874-9).
- Goehrke, C. Frühzeit des Ostslaven. Darmstadt: Wissenschaftliche Buchgesellschaft, 1992.
- Magocsi, Paul R. A History of Ukraine. Toronto: University of Toronto Press, 1996.
- Pritsak, Omeljan. The Origin of Rus'. Cambridge Mass.: Harvard University Press, 1991.
- Stang, Hakon. The Naming of Russia. Oslo: Middelelser, 1996.
- Gerard Miller as the author of the Normanist theory (Brockhaus and Efron)
- Logan, F. Donald (2005). The Vikings in History. Taylor & Francis. ISBN 0415327563. Archived from the original on 23 April 2023.
- Lunt, Horace G. (1975). "On the Language of Old Rus: Some Questions and Suggestions". Russian Linguistics. 2 (3/4): 269–281. doi:10.1007/BF00221437. ISSN 0304-3487. JSTOR 40159848. S2CID 153939821.
- Franklin, Simon (1996). The emergence of Rus, 750-1200. London: Longman. ISBN 9780582490918.
- Pritsak, Omeljan (1981). The origin of Rus'. Cambridge, Mass.: Harvard University Press. ISBN 9780674644656.
- Tolochko, Olksiy P. (2008). "The Primary Chronicle's 'Ethnography' Revisited: Slavs and Varangians in the Middle Dnieper Region and the Origin of the Rus' State". In Garipzanov, Ildar H.; Geary, Patrick J.; Urbańczyk, Przemysław (eds.). Franks, Northmen, and Slavs: Identities and State Formation in Early Medieval Europe. Brepols. pp. 169–188. ISBN 978-2-503-52615-7. Archived from the original on 10 August 2023.
- Brink, Stefan; Price, Price (2008). The Viking World. Routledge. ISBN 978-1134318261. Archived from the original on 14 April 2023.
- Duczko, Wladyslaw [in Polish] (2004). Viking Rus: Studies on the Presence of Scandinavians in Eastern Europe. Brill. ISBN 9004138749. Archived from the original on 14 April 2023.
- Waldman, Carl; Mason, Catherine (2005). Encyclopedia of European Peoples. Infobase Publishing. ISBN 1438129181. Archived from the original on 11 March 2023.
