= Russian-Etruscan pseudohistory =

Pseudohistorical and pseudolinguistic myth

Russian-Etruscan pseudohistory (the Etruscans are Russians) is a pseudohistorical and pseudolinguistic concept according to which the ancient people known as the Etruscans are identified with the Russian ethnic group (or with the "Rus" or Rus') or are considered ancestors of the Russians.

The myth is connected with the Russian version of the "Aryan" idea and is based, in particular, on attempts to read inscriptions on Etruscan monuments or vessels using modern Russian. Reading Etruscan inscriptions in Russian and interpreting the ethnonym Etruscans as "these are Russians" is used to substantiate the idea of a broad expansion of Russians in antiquity.

== History of the concept ==
The idea is already present in a legendary-historical work of the 17th century, the Tale of Mosoch, which tells of Mosoch, son of Japheth (the biblical Meshech), who went north immediately after the Tower of Babel. There he stopped at a river named after him, the Moskva, and "begot the Muscovites after his own name". The descendants of these "Muscovites" destroyed Troy; founded Venice; became the first inhabitants of the "Roman region", the Etruscans, whose Russian language subsequently "became corrupted"; captured Philip, father of Alexander the Great; conquered Rome and became its rulers even before the Goths came to Rome, and so on. Although "one Muscovite people" populated almost all of Europe, this was, "though under different names, nevertheless all one Muscovite people"; "the true pillar of the Slavic language is in the Muscovite land".

The authors of the Slavonic school claimed that the Slavs had settled over vast territories and in very ancient times, for which purpose they identified the Slavs with various peoples, including the Etruscans. The ideas of the Slavonic school were soon refuted by scholarship. Methodologically, these ideas do not correspond to modern scholarship.

A representative of the Slavonic school, Yuri Venelin, considered various peoples of antiquity to have been Slavic, and regarded the Slavs as one of the most ancient peoples of Europe. With Venelin began the idea of identifying the Etruscans with the Slavs and of the priority of their writing system.

The Russian empress Catherine II was interested in ancient Slavic history and regarded the toponymy of Spain, France, Scotland, India, and America as "Slavic". Catherine was the first to write that Etruscan and runic monuments were connected with "ancient Slavic writing". She subsequently arrived at the idea that the Slavs had conquered Europe three times, from the Don to Sweden and England.

In the late 1830s and 1840s, in opposition to German historiography, the ideas of this school were developed by one of the founders of Slavophilism, Alexei Khomyakov, who argued that the Slavs belonged to the Indo-Europeans. This general proposition subsequently received scholarly confirmation, unlike Khomyakov's specific arguments, in which he claimed, among other things, that the Slavs had been dispersed throughout prehistoric Europe from the Volga to France and the Netherlands. He regarded the Slavs as one of the most important components of many European peoples, including the Etruscans. He considered Troy a Slavic land and associated with it, rather than with the Roman emperor Trajan, the "ages of Trajan" in the Tale of Igor's Campaign.

A representative of the Slavonic school, Yegor Klassen, found Slavs in many territories and in many periods. In his view, Slavs had lived near the Baltic Sea 4,000 years ago, Russians heroically defended Troy, lived in Arabia during the time of King Solomon, and a "Great Russia" existed at the beginning of the Common Era. He identified almost all the peoples of Herodotus's Scythia, beginning with the Scythians themselves, with the Slavs, and connected the Russians with the Etruscans. He wrote that the Venedi already possessed writing 4,000 years ago and called all runic inscriptions Slavic. Overall, he put forward no new ideas, but compiled the views of a number of other authors. Those authors attempted to formulate methodological techniques and rely on them when analyzing sources, whereas Klassen did not. His work had an ideological purpose: to provide moral compensation for defeat in the Crimean War, seeking to demonstrate the historical "advantages" of Russians over other peoples and to prove their special political position in the world. Klassen had no authority either among his contemporaries or among specialists of subsequent generations.

The idea that Russians originated from the Etruscans is reflected in the works of Soviet researcher Nikolai Marr, creator of the pseudolinguistic "New Theory of Language"; however, Marr regarded the Etruscans not as an ethnic group but as a particular stage in the development of peoples. Adherents of the theory etymologically connected the Russians and Etruscans.

Beginning at the turn of the 1930s and 1940s, Soviet authors promoted the idea of an exclusively autochthonous development of early Slavic unity, with its roots traced back to the Chalcolithic or Bronze Age. The hypothesis developed that the Slavs had formed autochthonously at the beginning of the Common Era over a vast territory in Central and Eastern Europe—from the Don and the upper reaches of the Oka and Volga in the east to the Elbe and Saale in the west, and from the Aegean and Black Seas in the south to the Baltic coast and Ladoga in the north. Researchers sought traces of "Slavic colonies" supposedly existing in the second half of the 1st millennium CE west of this territory, extending as far as the Rhine. In connection with the revival of the views of the "Slavonic school", various ancient peoples, including the Etruscans, were again included among the ancestors of the Slavs. Within the state chauvinism that developed in the 1940s, Soviet scholarship temporarily revived a number of concepts of the Slavonic school. However, after the death of Stalin, most specialists lost interest in these ideas, including many of their former supporters.

The Nazi ideologue Alfred Rosenberg classified the Etruscans as harmful "Asians", whereas a number of Russian authors sought to connect them with "Russian Aryans".

The Etruscans were considered Russians by Soviet writer Vasily Zakharchenko, a participant in the Russian nationalist movement in the USSR that became known as the "Russian Party". In 1996, Zakharchenko and Vadim Chernobrov jointly published a collection that included, among other things, stories about "Slavs-Etruscans" and a "Slavic Kingdom", which according to the authors was "older than the Egyptian pyramids", as well as Atlantis, the supposedly deciphered Phaistos Disc, an "Aryan" state in the Southern Urals "older than the Egyptian pyramids", and other subjects.

Soviet historian and academician Boris Rybakov sought to make the history of the Russian people more ancient and, although he himself did not address this particular idea, "opened the floodgates for unscientific constructions such as the search for Rus among the Etruscans".

Neopagan writers Vladimir Shcherbakov and Valery Skurlatov identified the Slavic-Rus with various ancient peoples, including the Etruscans, portraying a sweeping picture of the movements of powerful pastoral tribes across the entire Eurasian steppe belt and adjacent lands, presented as the ancestral homeland of these ancient Slavic tribes. Shcherbakov identified the Etruscan language with Slavic, and the Etruscans-Rasen with "eastern Atlanteans" who survived in Asia Minor and the eastern Mediterranean after the destruction of Atlantis 12,000 years ago. In the writer's view, "the Etruscans are, figuratively speaking, a leaf torn from the Hittite-Slavic tree". The Etruscans, that is, the Slavs, are placed by the author at the origins of ancient Egyptian and Levantine cultures; in his view they settled the Canary Islands, becoming the ancestors of the Guanches, and undertook expeditions to the shores of Central America, influencing the Maya and Aztecs. Developing a number of Skurlatov's ideas, Shcherbakov claimed that the earliest inhabitants of Palestine, first the Canaanites and later the Philistines, were also originally "Pelasgian-Etruscans"; the Bible was written in the language of the Canaanites rather than the Israelites, who, according to the writer, appeared in Palestine relatively recently. According to Shcherbakov, another ancestral homeland of the Rus was Asia Minor, from which, after the defeat of Troy, the population fled to Europe, including the northern Black Sea region, the Dnieper region, and the Baltic Sea, where it restored its statehood. He identified the Etruscans with "the most ancient branch of the Mediterranean tribes", which gave rise to many peoples and cultures of the Mediterranean and Asia Minor. According to Shcherbakov, because of their "weak character", the Etruscans allowed themselves to be defeated by the Romans, "and Russians are now just as weak-willed as they were 2,000 years ago". Shcherbakov used his pseudohistorical speculations concerning "Etruscans—the descendants of the Proto-Slavs" in his science-fiction novel The Cup of Storms (1985), in which the Etruscans, Slavs, and Russians are identified with one another. Shcherbakov's ideas about an eternal, dating from the Paleolithic, confrontation between the Etruscans ("these are Russians") and the "Atlanteans" (Western civilization) were used by ideologues of the neo-Nazi organization Russian National Unity. Neopagan author A. M. Ivanov (Skuratov) rejected attempts to portray the Etruscans as Russians.

Yuri Petukhov, a writer and author of pseudohistorical works, sought to prove the "Slavic" identity of many ancient peoples known for glorious cultural achievements or conquests, including the Etruscans ("Rasen-Etruscans"). Petukhov identified the "Rus" with the Etruscans and other ancient peoples, as well as with the "Aryans", regarded them as a race, and called them the oldest people in the world, existing since the Paleolithic, who gave rise to many other peoples and created all the major civilizations.

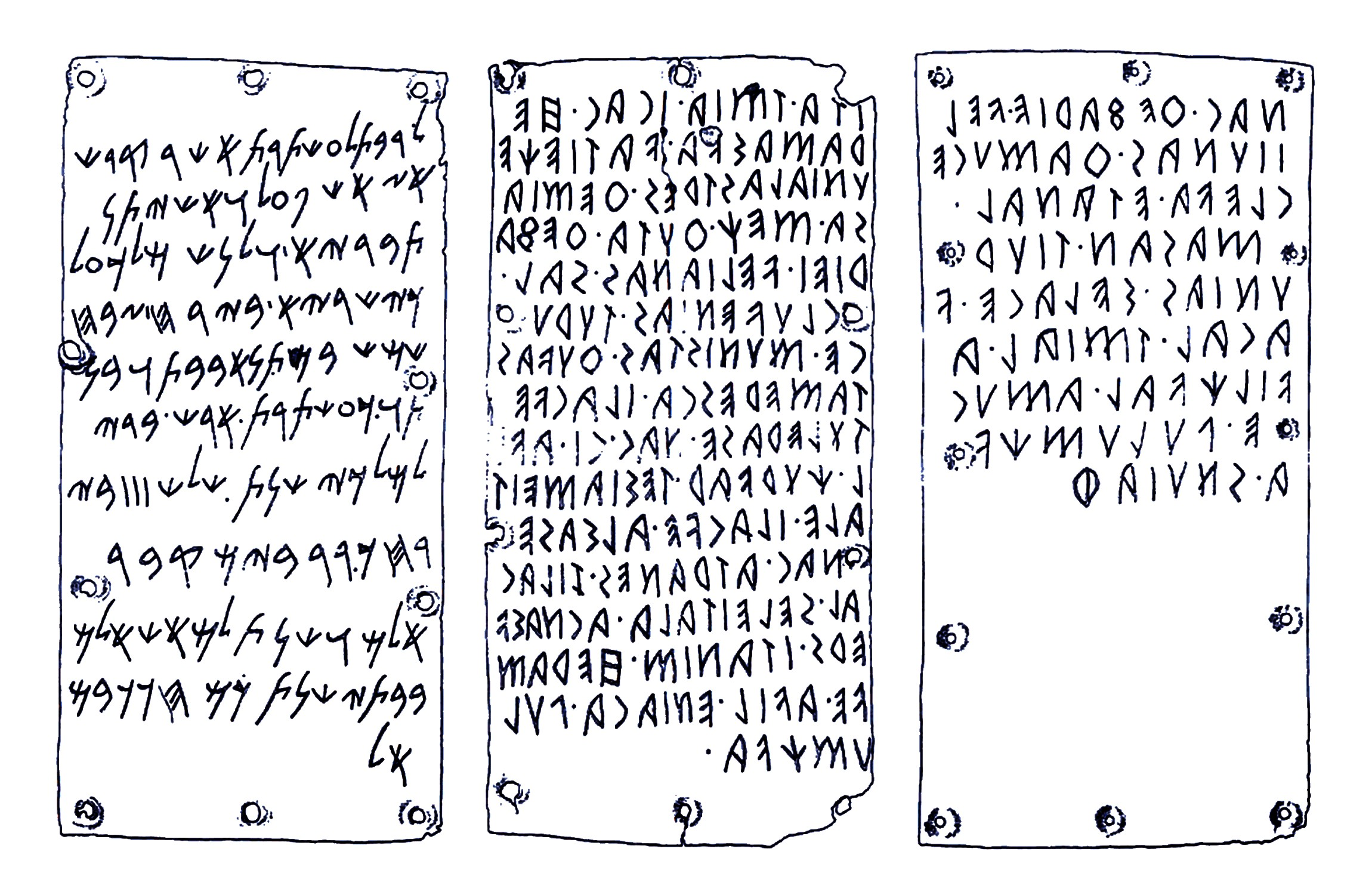
The text on the gold Pyrgi Tablets, read by Grinevich "in Slavic"

Geologist Gennady Grinevich, known for amateur "decipherments" of ancient inscriptions, claimed that the Slavs possessed writing as early as the 5th millennium BCE, citing the Tărtăria tablets, and regarded many ancient cultures, including the Etruscans, as ancient "Slavic cultures". According to Grinevich, the "Proto-Slavs" possessed not only the world's oldest writing system, but also aircraft with jet engines and deadly weapons resembling an atomic bomb. Grinevich set out to prove that Proto-Slavic was the world's oldest written language rather than a "secondary" language, that is, one derived from an older language. To this end, he collected a large number of known undeciphered or incompletely understood inscriptions from various parts of Eurasia—from the Indus Valley to Italy—and dating to different periods, beginning in the 5th millennium BCE. He placed in a single group the Phaistos Disc, inscriptions from the Troitsk settlement, Cretan texts written in Linear A and Linear B, Etruscan and Proto-Indian inscriptions, as well as an "example of book production of the 9th century"—the Book of Veles.

The discovery of tablets bearing pictographic signs at Tărtăria in Romania, as well as the study of signs on pottery belonging to the Vinča culture of the Balkans, stimulated searches for pre-Christian Slavic writing. A number of authors, including Skurlatov and Grinevich, portrayed these signs as the world's oldest alphabetic writing, created by "Etruscan-Slavs".

Viktor Bezverkhiy, one of the first ideologues of "Russian Vedism", regarded human history as "the history, above all, of white people", the creators and disseminators of culture. In his view, the main trunk of the "white people" represented the following succession: Sumerians, Hittite-Trojans, Etruscans, Scythians, Sarmatians, Russians. In a remote era, the territory of the Slavs supposedly extended over a vast area as far as China. Alexander Belov, one of the ideologues of Russian neopaganism, identified the "Rus" with various peoples, including the Etruscans. In his view, they all grew out of a powerful Proto-Slavic superethnos, while he considered Rus an earlier formation than the Slavs.

Doctor of Philosophy Valery Chudinov claimed that in antiquity all of Europe was inhabited only by Russian people, including the Etruscans, who spoke a variety of the Belarusian language.

Anatoly Fomenko and Gleb Nosovsky, authors of the pseudohistorical "New Chronology", wrote that the name "Etruscans", along with many other historical names, was derived from the word "Rus".

Satirist Mikhail Zadornov, also known as a supporter of neopagan ideas, reproduced Shcherbakov's and Grinevich's ideas about the "Slavic language" of Etruscan writing and the "Cretan disc". Failing to distinguish between Etruscan inscriptions and the Book of Veles, he claimed that the Etruscans wrote "on tablets". Zadornov shared the idea of a great Russian civilization that existed long before Rurik and accused those who did not believe in this of Russophobia.

Ukrainian émigré Lev Sylenko, founder of the Ukrainian neopagan movement RUN-vira, considered the Etruscans and Pelasgians to have come from Ukraine and to have created the brilliant Mycenaean culture. One of the first books written under Sylenko's influence and published in Ukraine was the posthumous work of physical chemistry specialist Alexander Znoiko (1989). Znoiko included various ancient peoples, including the Etruscans, in the genealogy of Ukrainian Rusichi, using the identification "Rus'—Etruscans". The Ukrainian Peasant Democratic Party, a political party that emerged in the 1990s and whose leaders included writer Serhiy Plachynda, was based on Sylenko's teachings; Plachynda regarded the Etruscans and a number of other ancient peoples as ancient Ukrainian tribes. He wrote about a powerful Proto-Ukrainian, or ancient Ukrainian, tribe of Etruscans, to which Jesus belonged. This tribe migrated from the Carpathian region and Galicia to Northern Italy, where it brought the achievements of culture and civilization and created a powerful state. Ukrainian Etruria gave rise to Ancient Greece and the Roman Empire. Ancient Ukrainians founded Troy and Rome. Ukrainian archaeologist Yuri Shilov quoted the Book of Veles according to the "translation" by neopagan author Alexander Asov and put forward his own version of its origin: it "could have been created by descendants of the priests of the Venedi-Etruscans at the end of the 9th century, somewhere in Crimea".

A number of other Ukrainian authors also wrote about connections between the Slavs and Etruscans and about the kinship of the "Rus", that is, Ukrainians, with the Etruscans. Ukrainian neopagans use, among other things, the "tomb of Aeneas" located near Rome as an argument for their views. Some authors, including Plachynda and Boris Yatsenko, attempted to read the "epitaph of Aeneas" on the basis of the Ukrainian language and concluded that the Trojans and Etruscans were directly related to modern Ukrainians. A substantial History of Ancient Ukraine, 7th–1st Millennia BCE was published in Kyiv, containing an Etruscan-Ukrainian dictionary that conveys a folk etymology through various phonetic correspondences: "Etruscans—that is, Rus'ki".

== Historical context ==
Etruscans, an ancient people whose self-designations included Rasenna, Raṡna, inhabited in the 1st millennium BCE primarily the northwestern part of the Apennine Peninsula, the historical region of Etruria, corresponding largely to modern Tuscany, between the Arno and Tiber rivers. Since antiquity, various theories of Etruscan ethnogenesis have been proposed. At the beginning of the 21st century, the most productive view is considered to be that the ethnogenesis of the Etruscans was a complex process involving local components as well as populations arriving by sea from the East, most likely from Asia Minor. This process dates to the beginning of the 1st millennium BCE. Archaeological sites associated with the Etruscans date no earlier than the 8th century BCE; their relationship to the preceding Villanovan culture remains disputed.

The Slavs are known in Greco-Latin sources from the 6th century as the Sclaveni. According to archaeology, the Slavs had formed no later than the second half of the 4th century. The similarity of the Slavic languages, combined with their extensive territory and lack of political unity, as well as the linguistic similarity of the earliest Slavic written monuments (late 1st–early 2nd millennium), indicates a compact area of initial settlement and a late fragmentation of the community. According to most researchers, the ancient and early Slavs inhabited the forest and forest-steppe zone from the Oder to the Middle Dnieper and the adjacent territory of Polesia. The first indisputable mention of the Rus ("the people of Ros") occurs under the year 839 in the Annals of St. Bertin.

Linguist and academician A. A. Zaliznyak wrote about the arbitrary nature of the assumption that the ancestors of the Russians could have lived in Italy in antiquity. He also noted that none of the readings of Etruscan inscriptions in modern Russian can be correct, among other reasons because the predecessor of the Russian language in the Etruscan period would have looked substantially different. The word "Russian" did not exist in the Slavic world in the 1st millennium BCE at all. If one hypothetically assumed its existence, then in the language preceding Slavic it would have had to take the form [rous-isk-os]. The principal name for the Etruscans among the Latins was tuscī (cf. modern Toscana, originally meaning "land of the Etruscans")—from the earlier turscī (cf. the Oscan name for the Etruscans turskum and the Greek tyrsēnoi, with the variant tyrrēnoi, from which the name of the Tyrrhenian Sea derives). The Latin form etruscī is clearly secondary. The Etruscans' own name for themselves was an entirely different word—rasna. "These are Russians" is an entire sentence; there are no examples of a people's name being constructed as a sentence.
