= Letter of Alexander the Great to the Slavs =

The Letter of Alexander the Great to the Slavs is a late medieval forged letter attributed to Alexander the Great. It is also called the Manifesto, Record or Privilege of Alexander the Great to (or for) the Slavs. It is sometimes given the Latin title Privilegium Slavicum.

The Letter cannot be connected to any actual event in Alexander's life nor is its central idea derived from any other legendary Alexander material. It was produced in order to enhance to the status of the Slavs by associating them with Alexander.

== Synopsis ==
The Letter is a rather naive forgery, which is unsurprising for its time and place. It is dated to the twelfth year of Alexander's reign, i.e., 324 BC. It is in the form of a charter addressed "to the illustrious race of the Slavs and their nationality". It consists of long opening and closing formulae bracketing the grant itself, which is only two sentences.

In the opening formula, Alexander identifies himself as the he-goat of Daniel 8:21, the son of Jupiter (or Ammon), the one prophesied by Nectanebo, the one who talked to the Brahmins and the Trees of the Sun and Moon, as the conqueror of Persia and the lord of the world. He then rewards the Slavs on account of their bravery and military service with "the entire tract of land from the north to the confines of southern Italy" in perpetuity. Anybody else residing in this area is to be the slave of the Slavs.

Given in Alexandria, the Letter is witnessed by the logothete Antiolochus and the eleven princes whom Alexander as named his heirs and consented to by the deities Jupiter, Mars, Pluto and Minerva.

== History ==
The Letter may have been composed in the 14th century, but no reference to it before the Hussite Revolution is known. The oldest preserved copy is the Latin one found in the Cerroni manuscript (shelfmark Brno, Státní oblastní archív, G 12, Cerr.II.108), which dates to 1443 or 1447. It is found on folio 10v, after the Krátké sebránie z kronik českých ('Brief Compilation from Czech Chronicles'). The Krátké sebránie cites the Letter to demonstrate that the Germanic-speaking peoples had once been subordinate to the Slavs. In early Czech historiography, its authenticity was accepted without question.

The Letter was first published in a Czech translation by Wenceslaus Hajek at Prague in 1541. Hajek asserted that the Letter had been cited as justification at the founding of the Emmaus Monastery for the Slavonic liturgy in 1348. The oldest Czech version gives the title Zápis Alexandra Velikého slovenskému jazyku a českému na budúcie časy ('Epistle of Alexander the Great to the Slavonic Language and the Czech for Future Times'). In modern versions, this is usually Zápis Alexandra Velikého Slovanům.

In 1549, Dominic Cyllenius published a Latin version of the Letter claiming it was a translation from Greek, although it is probable that he knew only that such a Latin letter as he had, if authentic, must originally have been drawn up in Greek. The Letter was first published in Poland by Marcin Bielski in 1551, based on Hajek's text. Prior to 1555, no author expressed a negative opinion of the Letter's authenticity. In that year, however, the Polish bishop Marcin Kromer rejected it, but to little effect. Later Polish historians, who also knew Cyllenius' edition, were fascinated by the Letter, believing that the original had been captured by the Turks at the Battle of Varna.

A Latin inscription from the Emmaus Monastery in Prague was copied and translated by Fynes Moryson in 1592 and published in 1617. The Hungarian lawyer Péter Révay accepted the Letter as authentic in 1613.

== Authorship ==
In 1817, Josef Dobrovský claimed that that the Letter originated in Croatia in the 14th century. Otakar Odložilík also inclines the view that the work is probably of South Slav origin.

Modern attempts to identify the real author of the Letter have typically proceeded on the assumption that it was written around the time of the Letter's appearance. Knowing that the earliest surviving manuscript dated to the 1440s, František Bartoš proposed that the author was Lawrence of Březová, a leading Hussite. Friedrich Pfister, on the other hand, aware of four manuscripts but unaware of the Cerroni manuscript, placed the composition of the Letter shortly before his earliest manuscript (1516). Adam Bohorič, in his Arcticae horulae succissivae de Latinocarniolana literatura (1584), writes how the Slovene noblemen Francis of Thurn and Sigismund von Herberstein searched for a copy of the Letter until they found one in Prague. On the basis of this passage, Pfister suggested that Thurn and Herberstein were in fact the authors of the text who invented a story of discovery to cover themselves.

== English text ==
In Moryson's translation, the letter reads:

Wee Alexander the Great of King Philip, the founder of the Grecian Empire, Conquerour of the Persians, Meades etc. and of the whole World, from the East to West, from North to South, sonne of great Jupiter, by etc. so called. To you the noble stocke of the Sclauonians, and to your language, because you have beene to me helpers, true in faith, and valiant in warte, I confirme all this tract pom the North to the South parts of Italy, from me and my successours, to you and your posterity. If any other Nation be found there, let them be your slaues.

Dated in our City of Alexandria, newly founded by us upon the great Riuer of Nilus the twelfth of the Goddesse Minerva; witnesses are Aethra and the 11 princes whom we appoint successours to us dying without heire.

It is impossible to know if the shortcomings of Moryson's version stem from his own carelessness or were present in the inscription. Most surviving copies are faulty in some way or other. Friedrich Pfister offered a reconstructed text. This has been translated into English by Otakar Odložilík and Matthew Spinka.

== See also ==
- Letters of Alexander the Great
