= Sergey Solovyov =

Sergey Solovyov or Sergei Solovyov may refer to the following Russian people:

- Sergei Solovyov (Catholic priest) (1885–1942), Russian poet and priest
- Sergei Solovyov (film director) (1944–2021), Russian film director
- Sergey Solovyov (footballer) (1915–1967), Soviet footballer
- Sergey Solovyov (historian) (1820–1879), Russian historian
- Sergey Solovyov (mathematician) (1955–2023), Russian mathematician
- Sergey Solovyov (politician) (born 1961), Russian politician
