= Yuriy Venelin =

Rusyn slavist and folklorist

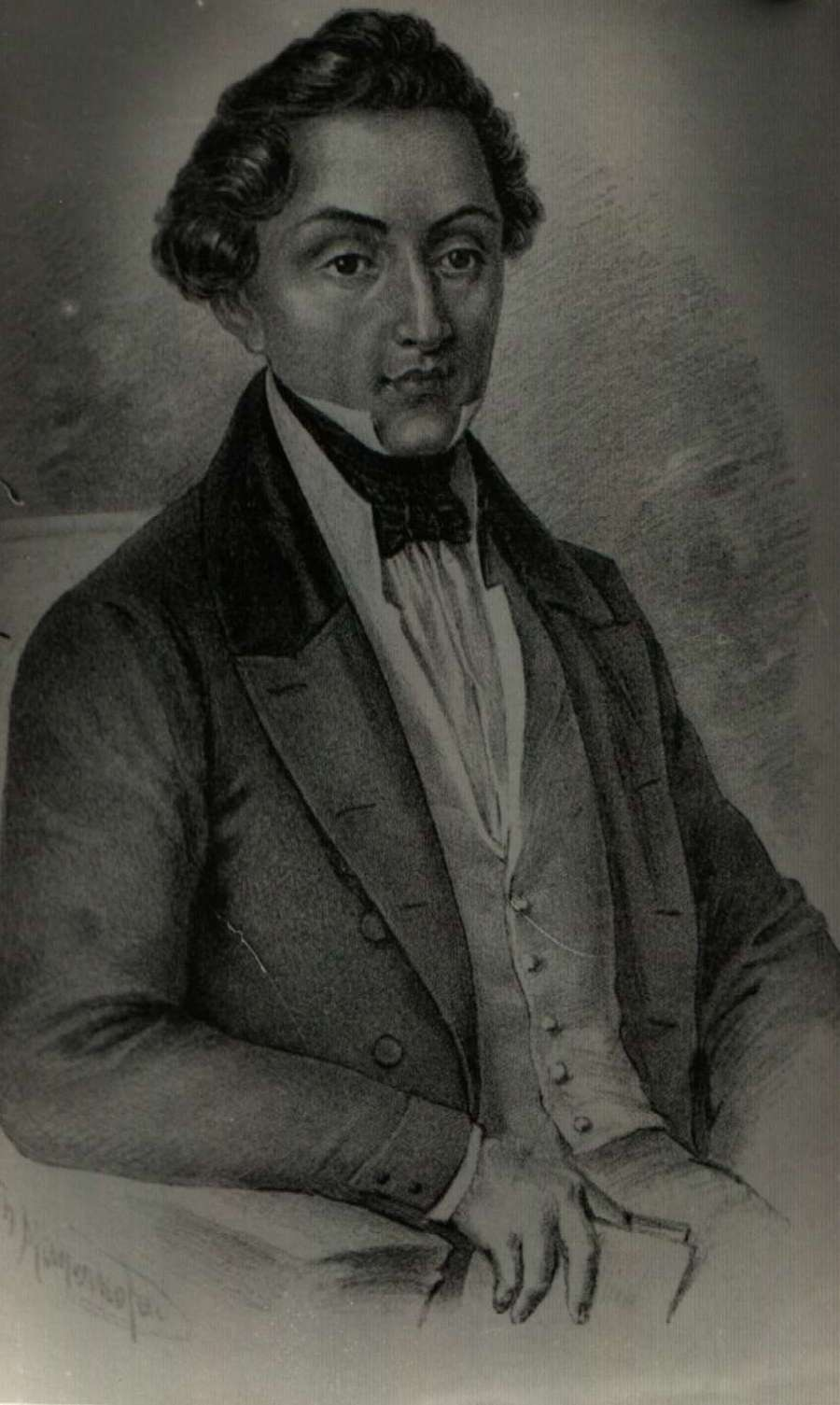
- Born: Georgiy Hutsa; September 22, 1802; Havasalja, Habsburg Empire
- Died: March 26, 1839 (aged 36); Moscow, Russian Empire
- Education: Imperial Moscow University; Lviv University
- Occupation: Historian

Yuriy Ivanovich Venelin (Rusyn: Юрій Іванович Венелін; born Georgiy Hutsa; 22 September 1802 – 26 March 1839) was a Rusyn slavist, folklorist, ethnographer and philologist best known for his research on the language, history and culture of Bulgaria and its people.

== Biography ==
Venelin was born in the village of Velka Tibava in Transcarpathia, Habsburg Empire (the present day village of Tybava in Mukachevo Raion of Zakarpattia Oblast of Ukraine). He enrolled in Lviv University and later moved to Chişinău, where he examined the language and history of Bulgarian expatriates. Venelin studied medicine at the Imperial Moscow University, but his interest in Bulgarian culture continued.

In 1830, he was envoyed to the Ottoman-ruled Bulgarian lands by the Saint Petersburg Academy of Sciences. He visited Bulgarian cities such as Varna, Kavarna and Silistra, recording folk songs and sayings and gaining a firsthand knowledge of the Bulgarian language. In 1836, he made the acquaintance of Odesa-based Bulgarian émigré Vasil Aprilov, with whom he kept up an active correspondence.

He died in Moscow in 1839.

== Works ==
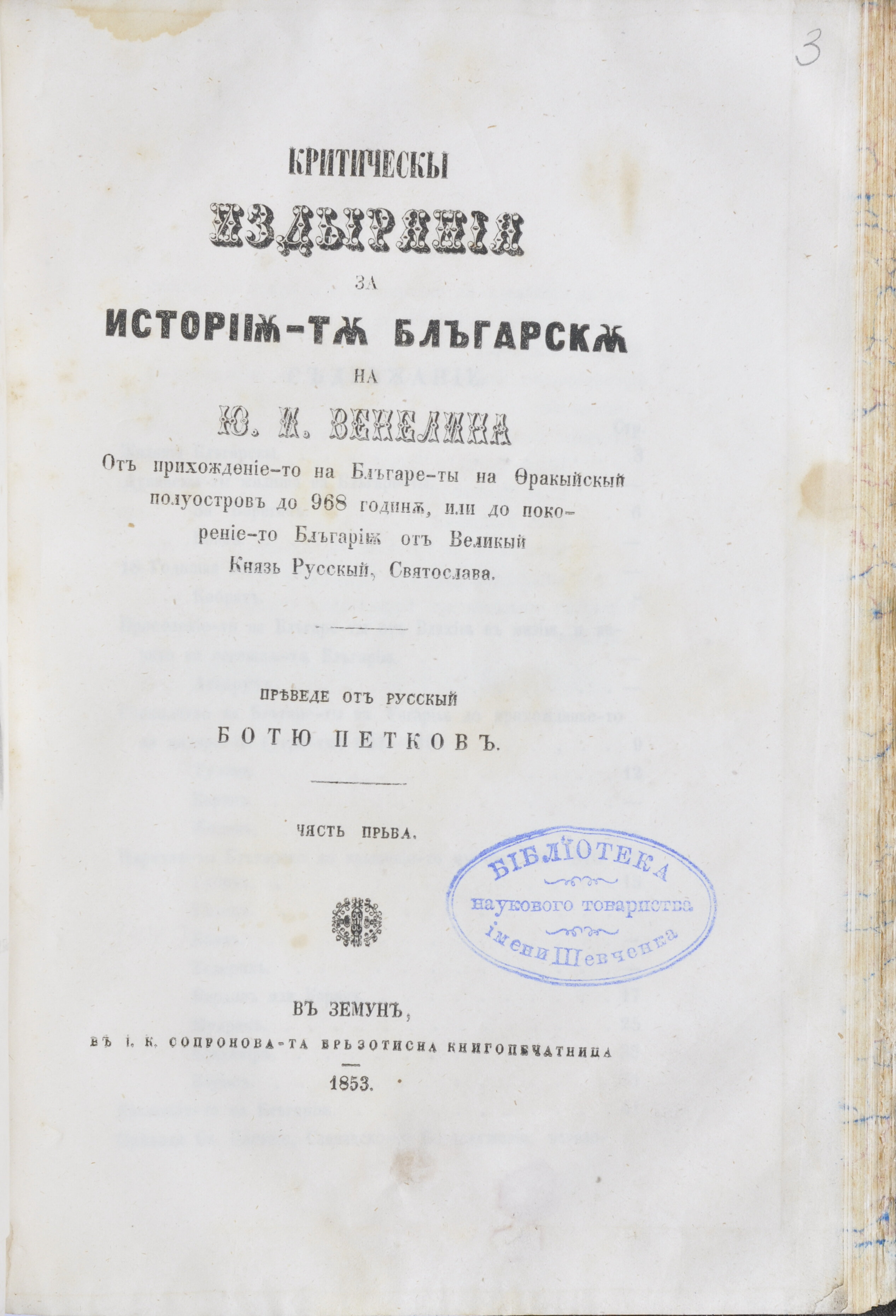
Critical studies on the history of Bulgaria

Venelin was the author of The old and today's Bulgarians in their political, ethnographic, historical and religious relations to the Russians, published in three volumes from 1829 to 1841. The work has been credited for popularizing the Bulgarian culture and history in the Russian Empire and influencing the national feelings of many Bulgarian émigrés.

Venelin's book Critical studies on the history of Bulgaria, published posthumously in an abridged version in 1849 in Moscow on historian Spiridon Palauzov's initiative. The issue was financed by Russia-based Bulgarian merchant Ivan Denkoglu. The book was published again in 1853 in a complete Bulgarian translation in Zemun in today's Serbia; the translation was done by teacher Botyu Petkov, father of poet Hristo Botev.

Other works by Yuriy Venelin include On the character of folk songs among the trans-Danubian Slavs, On the formation of new Bulgarian literature, Grammar of the modern Bulgarian language and Ancient and Modern Slovenes.

- Древние и нынешние болгары в политическом, народописном, историческом и религиозном их отношении к россиянам. Историко-критические изыскания. Т. I. Москва, 1829
- "О характере народных песен у славян задунайских" (1835);
- О зародыше новой болгарской литературы. Москва, 1838
- Влахо-болгарскиe или дако-славянскиe грамоты, собранныe и объясненныe на иждивении Императорской Российской Академии. Санкт-Петербург, 1840
- Древние и нынешние словене в политическом, народописном, историческом и религиозном их отношении к россиянам. Историко-критические изыскания. Т. II. Москва, 1841
- Скандинавомания и еe поклонники или столетние изыскания о варягах. Историко-критическое разсуждение. Москва, 1842
- Критическиe изследованиs об истории болгар, с прихода болгар на Фракийский полуостров до 968 года, или покорения Болгарии Великим князем русским, Святославом. Изданныя на иждивении болгарина И. Н. Денкоглу. Москва, 1849
- Древние и нынешние болгары в политическом, народописном, историческом и религиозном их отношении к россиянам. Историко-критические изыскания. Издание второе. Москва, 1856

== Contributions ==
One of Venelin's significant contributions was his identification of the first Slavonic translations of the Scriptures as the Old Bulgarian language, which he considered a direct ancestor of the modern Bulgarian language. This was a groundbreaking discovery in paleoslavistics, as it established Bulgarian as one of the oldest Slavic languages and demonstrated the crucial role that Bulgarian played in the development of Slavic culture and literature. Therefore Venelin, along with Vostokov, stands at the origins of that point of view, which soon became and still is dominant in worldwide Slavic studies.

== Bibliography ==
- A. Andreev; D. Tsygankov (2010). Imperial Moscow University: 1755-1917: encyclopedic dictionary. Moscow: Russian political encyclopedia (ROSSPEN). pp. 118–119. ISBN 978-5-8243-1429-8.
