= Vasily Vasilievsky =

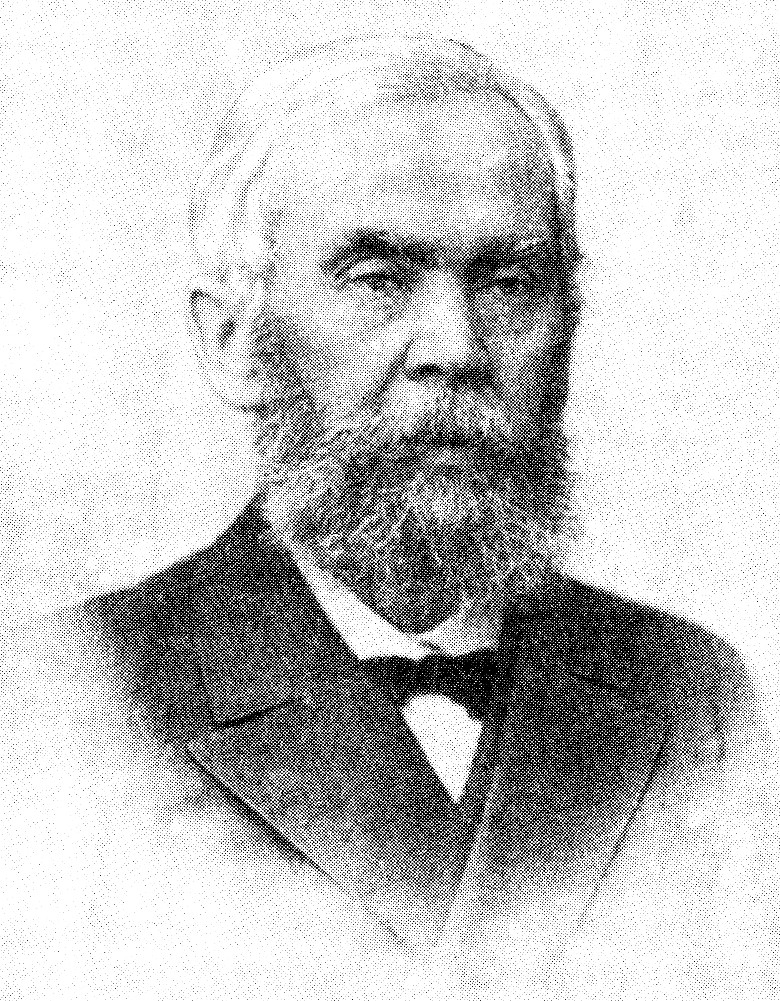
Vasili G. Vasilievski

Vasily Grigorievich Vasilievsky, sometimes Vasiljevskij or Wasiliewski (Russian: Васи́лий Григо́рьевич Василье́вский; 2 February 1838 – 25 May 1899) was a Russian historian who founded the St. Petersburg school of medieval studies and was a major force in Byzantine studies during the second half of the 19th century.

The son of a rural priest, Vasilievsky was born on 2 February 1838. Graduating with honours from the University of St. Petersburg in 1860, he was appointed professor there and was elected into the Russian Academy of Sciences in 1890.

Vasilievsky edited the Journal of the Ministry of Education before founding, in 1894, the Vizantiyskiy Vremennik, which remains the chief organ for Byzantine studies in Russia to this day. He was the first to publish many medieval Greek sources relating to Russian history (Byzantium and the Pechenegs, 1872). He was also the first to research the agrarian history of Byzantium and its tax system (Iconoclast Legislation, 1878).

Vasilievsky died in Florence on 25 May 1899. His collected works were published in four volumes between 1908 and 1930. The Brockhaus and Efron Encyclopedic Dictionary (1890-1906) noted that "almost every modern Byzantinist is Vasilievsky's disciple". The foremost among his pupils was Alexander Vasiliev (1867-1953).
