= Maykov =

Maykov (Russian: Ма́йков), or Maykova (feminine; Ма́йкова) is a Russian surname associated with the noble Maykov family. Notable people with the surname include:

- Aleksandr Maykov (1902–1977), Soviet Army officer
- Apollon Aleksandrovich Maykov (1761–1838), Russian poet and State Counsellor, father of Nikolay
- Evgeniya Maykova (1803–1880), Russian writer and poet, wife of Nikolay
- Nikolay Maykov (1794–1873), Russian painter and his sons:
  - Apollon Maykov (1821–1897), Russian poet
  - Valerian Maykov (1823–1847), Russian writer and literary critic
  - Vladimir Maykov (1826-1885), Russian publisher
  - Leonid Maykov (1839–1900), Russian literary expert, ethnographer and academician
- Vasili Maykov (1728–1778), Russian poet and playwright, uncle of Apollon Alexandrovich
