= Sergey Shubinsky =

Russian general and historian (1834–1913)

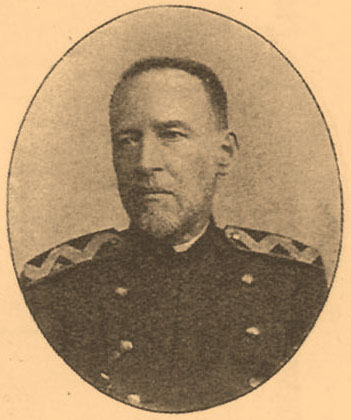
Sergey N. Shubinsky

Sergey Nikolayevich Shubinsky (Russian: Серге́й Никола́евич Шуби́нский; 1834–1913) was a Russian historian and journalist who edited two widely read magazines concerned with the history of Imperial Russia.

== Career ==
Shubinsky had a successful military career from 1854 onward, retiring with the rank of major general in 1887. He developed a keen interest in the comparatively recent history of his country while collecting hitherto unpublished anecdotes about Grigory Potemkin.

Shubinsky edited an illustrated monthly periodical, Old and New Russia, in 1875–1879, before setting up a more widely distributed magazine, The Historical Herald, in 1880. He remained in charge of the periodical until his death in 1913. The publisher was Aleksey Suvorin. Shubinsky also authored a splattering of historical articles for the Brockhaus and Efron Encyclopedic Dictionary.

Shubinsky's main rivals in the realm of Russian historical journalism were Pyotr Bartenev, the editor of The Russian Archive, and Mikhail Semevsky with his own periodical, Old Times in Russia.

== Sources ==
- "Шубинский, Сергей Николаевич" . Brockhaus and Efron Encyclopedic Dictionary (in Russian). 1906.
