= Vladimir Saitov =

Russian historian

Vladimir Ivanovich Saitov
- Владимир Иванович Саитов
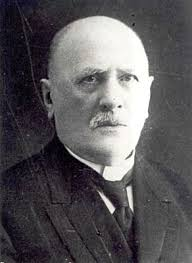
- Born: June 17, 1849; Saint Petersburg, Russian Empire
- Died: January 29, 1938 (aged 88); Leningrad, Russian Soviet Federative Socialist Republic, Soviet Union
- Education: Second Saint Petersburg Gymnasium
- Awards: Order of Saint Stanislaus; Order of Saint Vladimir; Order of Saint Anna
- Scientific career
- Fields: History of literature, bibliography
- Workplaces: National Library of Russia

Vladimir Ivanovich Saitov (June 17, 1849, Saint Petersburg – January 29, 1938, Leningrad) was a Russian bibliographer and literary historian, secretary of the Imperial Russian Historical Society (1916). Actual State Councilor (1916).

== Biography ==
He studied at the 2nd Saint Petersburg Gymnasium, graduated from the 5th grade, left the gymnasium due to illness in 1867, after which he took up self-education. He began his creative activity in 1875: he collected and described literary and historical monuments, since 1877 he published articles.

Since 1888, he served in the Imperial Public Library as an assistant librarian of the Russian language book department, with work in which all of Saitov's further activities were connected (with a break from 1893 to 1899). In 1909, he headed this department, in 1916 he was granted the rank of acting state councilor. Since 1928, in which Saitov retired, the Russian branch at the initiative of Nikolai Marr received his name.

The most important of the works of Saitov is the editorial board of "Works of Konstantin Batyushkov" (Saint Petersburg, 1887), jointly with Leonid Maykov. Under the modest name of "notes", this publication contains detailed biographies of Saitov's pen of almost all the most important figures of Russian literature of the early 19th century. Saitov received an incentive Pushkin Prize for this work.

Some of these biographies are extensive, the first in literary studies of Russian writers; such, for example, are the biographies of Alexander Turgenev, Prince Peter Shalikov, Dmitry Dashkov, Mikhail Muravyov, Vladislav Ozerov, Vasily Kapnist, Vasily Pushkin, Alexander Gruzintsev. According to a general review by critics of the late 19th century, these "notes" by Saitov constitute the decoration of the publication, which thanks to them is a handbook for the historian of Russian literature.

Saitov's notes on the publication of Count Sergei Sheremetev: "Ostafevsky Archive", edited by Saitov (Volume 1: "Correspondence Between Prince Vyazemsky and Alexander Turgenev", Saint Petersburg, 1899), are equally thoroughly distinguished.

Under the leadership of Saitov, many young scientists began their historical and literary works, striving for the same accuracy and completeness of research as Saitov's works differ.

The Academy of Sciences attracted Vladimir Ivanovich Saitov to the staff of the publication of the works of Pushkin undertaken by it. Saitov owned one of the most comprehensive private libraries dedicated to the history of Russian literature.

Saitov had a reputation as a conscientious historian of literature, a bibliographer, a fanatic of his craft. He told Korney Chukovsky, having seen in one of the pamphlets a stamp placed directly on the portrait of Leon Trotsky: "I myself do not like Trotsky, I would have gladly hung him. But why should iconography suffer?".

Saitov also found information about the remarkable pre-revolutionary burials at the Bogoslovskoe Cemetery, and included 39 personalities in the Saint Petersburg Necropolis compiled by him.

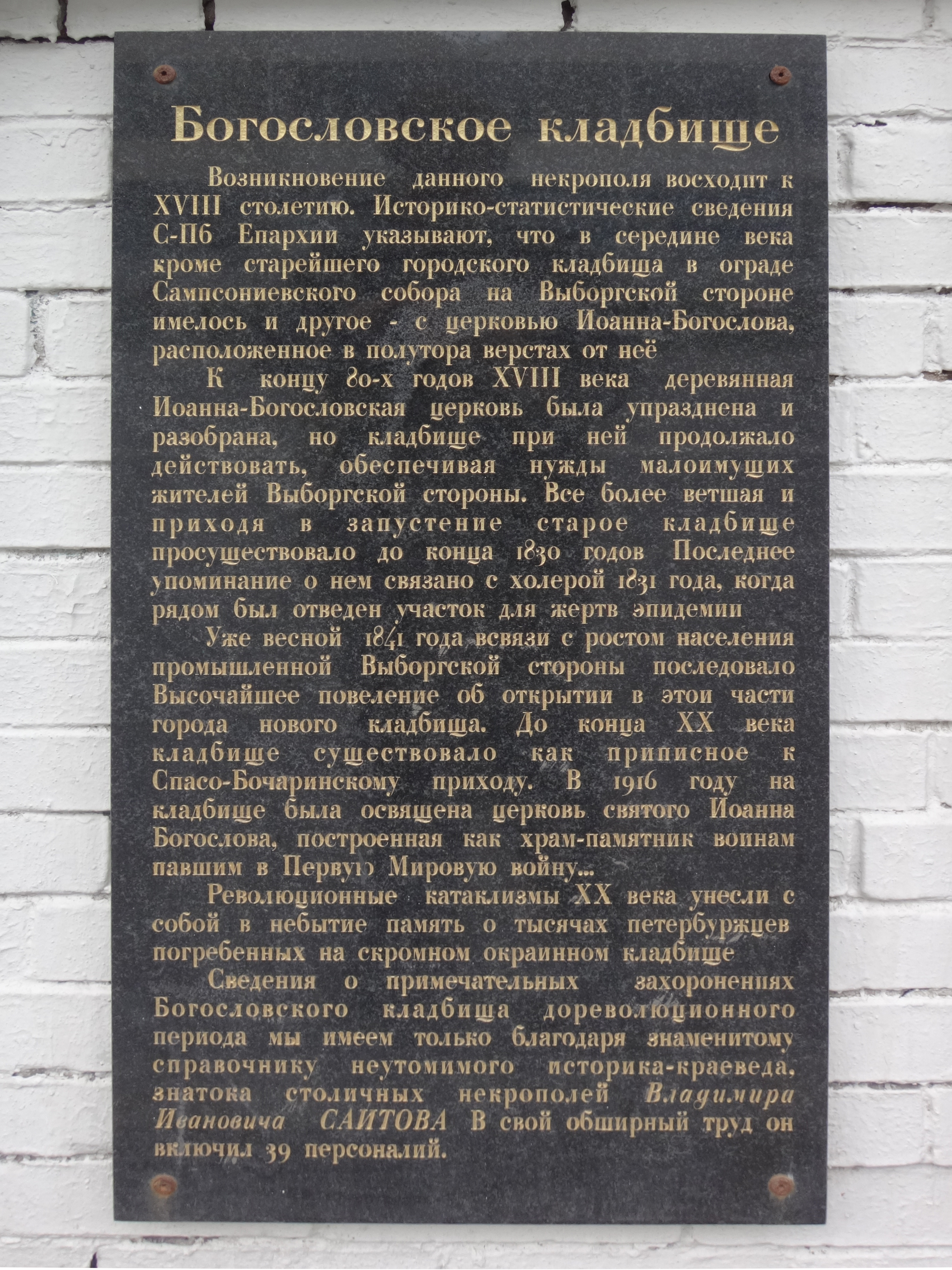
Basic information about the Bogoslovskoe Cemetery (first board)

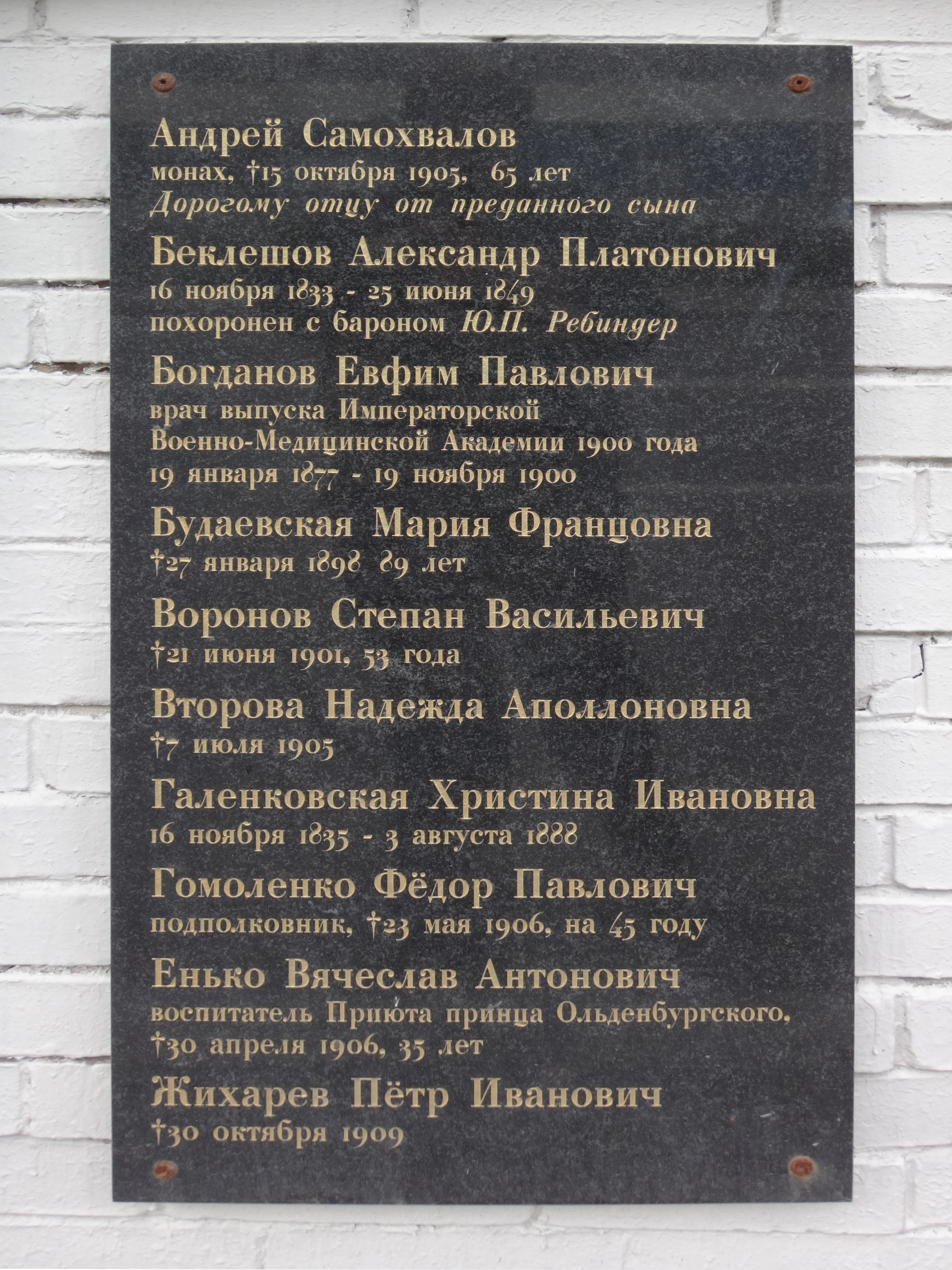
Noteworthy pre-revolutionary burials; compiled by Vladimir Ivanovich Saitov (second board)

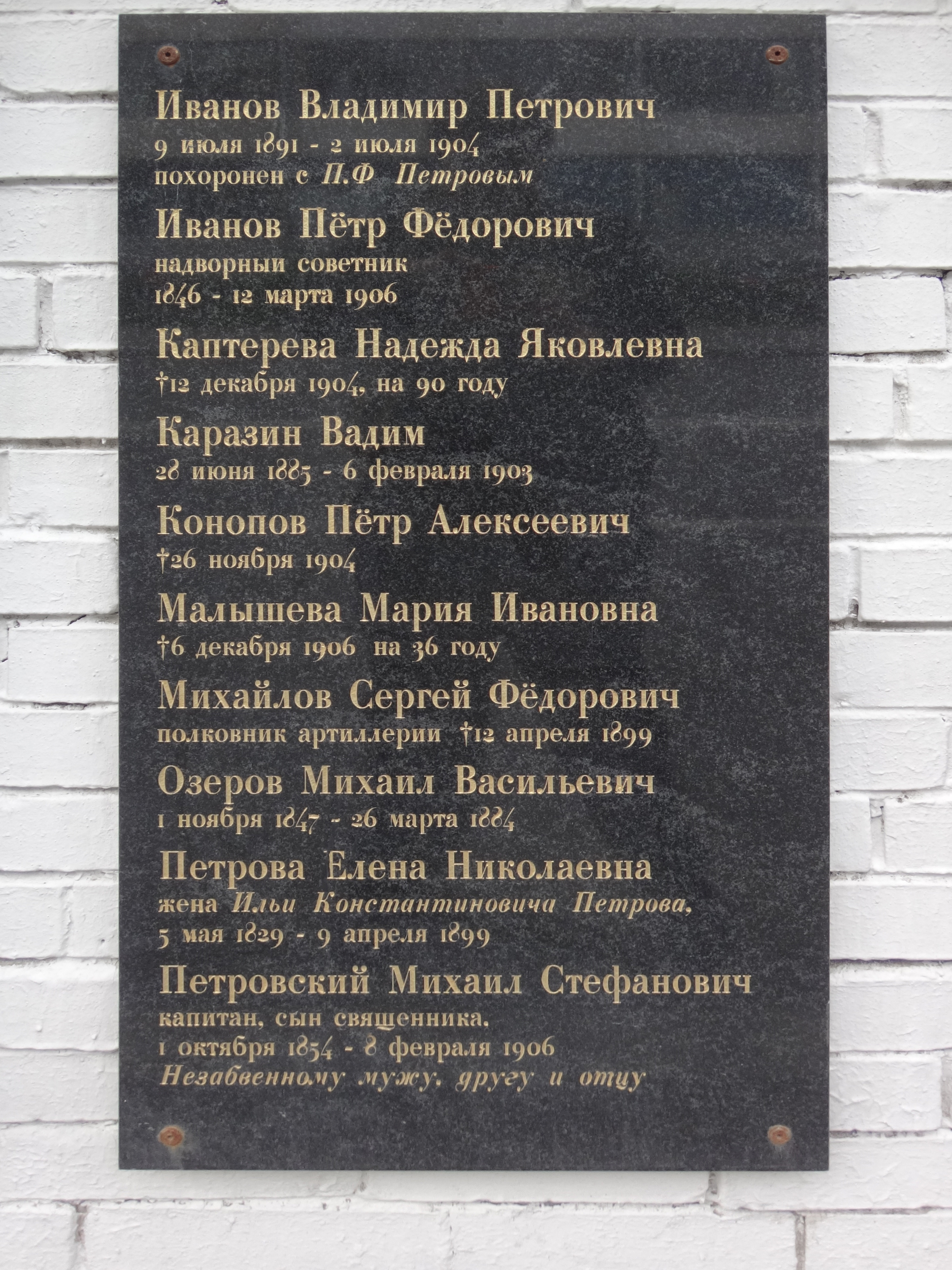
List of pre-revolutionary burials; continued (third board)

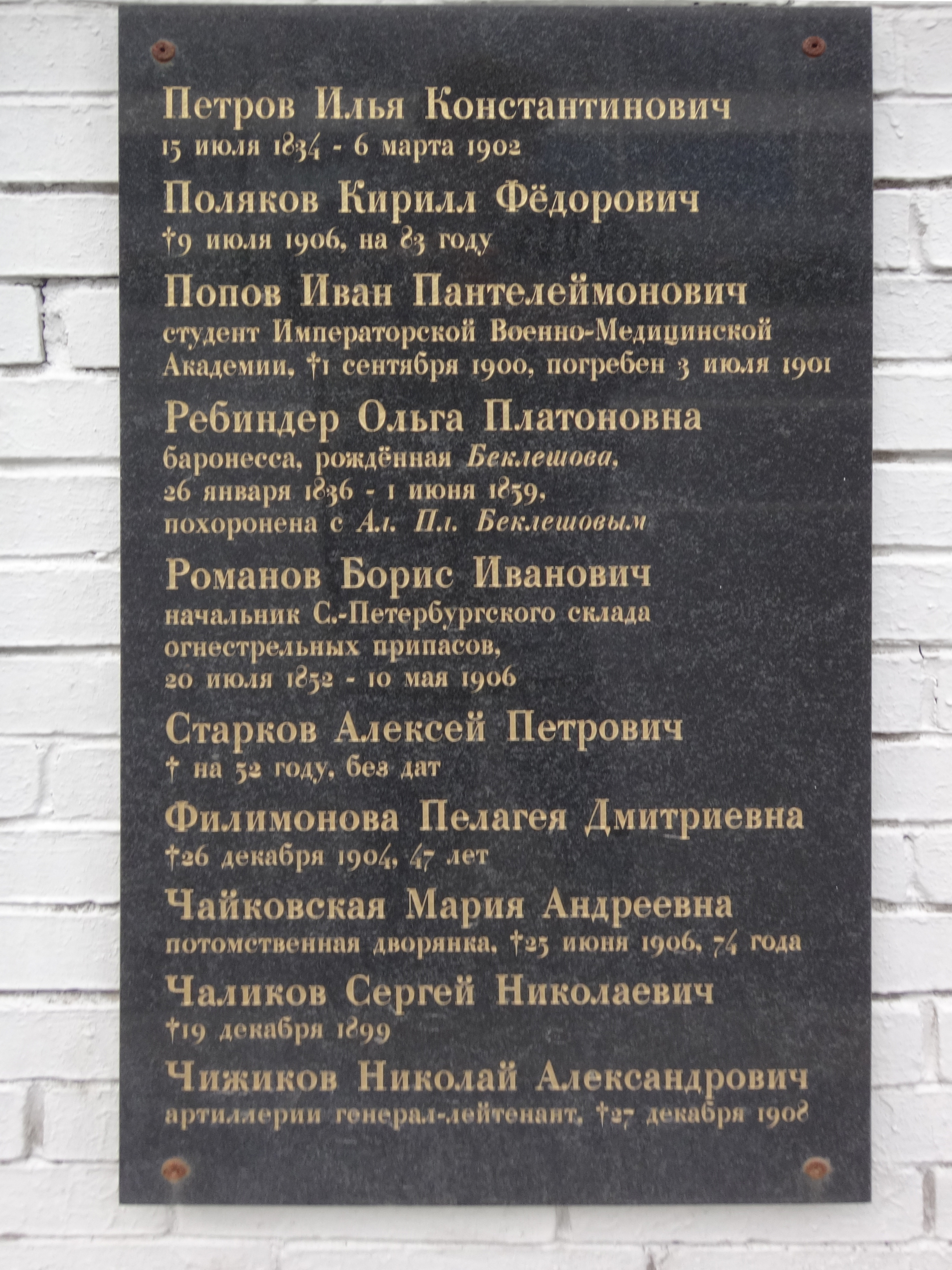
List of pre-revolutionary burials; continued (fourth board)

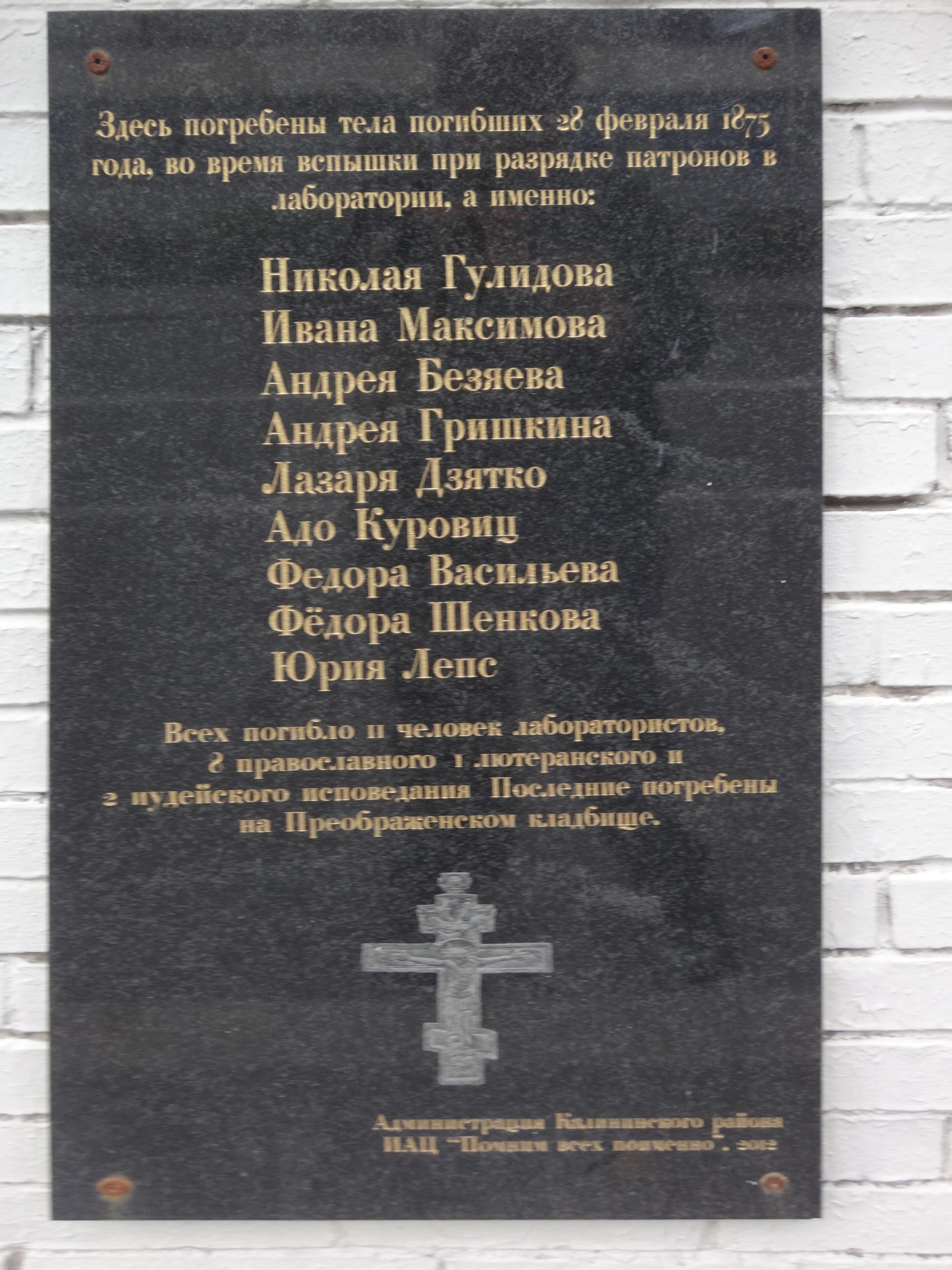
The list of the dead on February 28, 1875, during the explosion in the artillery laboratory (fifth board)

== Family ==
- Wife – Elena Konstantinovna Saitova (née Yakusheva) (1867–1921);
- Son – Boris Vladimirovich Saitov, a famous musicologist, born in 1897, died in the besieged Leningrad on February 5, 1942, and was buried in the Piskaryovskoye Cemetery.

== Burial place ==
Vladimir Ivanovich was buried in the Smolensky Orthodox Cemetery, his grave was lost over time, but in the 2010s the search group Memorial, Educational and Historical and Cultural Center "Beloye Delo" located his grave on Straight Track, plot 173; next to the grave of his wife Elena Konstantinovna. In 2017, the Saitov's family burial was restored by the Sobor Limited Liability Company, and in December of the same year, a funeral service was served at their graves by Archpriests Igor Yesipov and John of Moscow.

== Works ==
- Notes and additions to Sopikov"s "Experience of the Russian Bibliography" in the "Journal of the Ministry of Public Education", 1878, No. 6, and separately;
- Additions to the "Dictionary" of Gennadi (ibid., 1877, Volume 189);
- "Saint Petersburg Necropolis" (Moscow, 1883, annex to the "Russian Archive");
- Fedor Grigorievich Karin: One of the Little-Known Writers of the Second Half of the 18th Century is Saint Petersburg: the editorial board of the Journal "Bibliographer" (Nikolai Lisovsky), 1893 – 23 pages
- Together with Boris Modzalevsky: Moscow Necropolis: Volume 1–3; [The Author of the Preface and Publication, Grand Duke Nikolai Mikhailovich] – Saint Petersburg: the Printing House of Mikhail Stasyulevich, 1907–1908
- Vladimir Saitov (Compiler), on Behalf of Grand Duke Nikolai Mikhailovich (1912–1913). Petersburg Necropolis, Volume 1 (A–D), Volume 2 (D–L), Volume 3 (M–R), Volume 4 (S – Fita). Saint Petersburg, Printing House of Mikhail Stasyulevich, 5th line of Vasilyevsky Island, House 28.

== Editorial office ==
- Works of Vasily Pushkin, with a Biographical Sketch and Notes (Saint Petersburg, 1893);
- "Letters of Nikolai Karamzin to Alexander Turgenev" in "Russian Antiquity", 1899, No. 1–4

== Sources ==
- Vladimir Ivanovich Saitov // Brockhaus and Efron Encyclopedic Dictionary: in 86 Volumes (82 Volumes and 4 Additional) – Saint Petersburg, 1890–1907
- Alexander Kobak, Yuri Piryutko (2011). Historical Cemeteries of Saint Petersburg. Moscow: Centerpolygraph, 2nd Edition, Revised. ISBN 978-5-227-02688-0.
- Vyacheslav Savitsky (2018). Elena Dementieva (ed.). "His Name is the Russian Branch of the Public Library" (PDF). С уважением к памяти (Newspaper). 1 (113). Saint Petersburg: Non-profit Organization "Association of Funeral Enterprises of Saint Petersburg and the North–West Region", Limited Liability Company "Map" (Design and Layout): 7.
