= Leonid Maykov =

Russian literary historian and ethnographer (1839–1900)

Leonid Nikolaevich Maykov
- Леонид Николаевич Майков
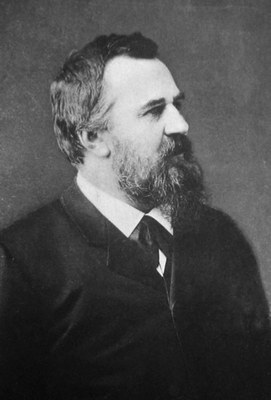
- Born: April 9, 1839; Saint Petersburg
- Died: April 20, 1900 (aged 61); Saint Petersburg
- Resting place: Novodevichy Cemetery, Saint Petersburg
- Occupations: Historian of Russian literature, bibliographer, ethnographer
- Parents: Nikolay Maykov (father); Evgeniya Maykova (mother)
- Awards: Ordre des Palmes académiques Order of Saint Anna; Order of Saint Vladimir; Order of Saint Stanislaus; Uvarov Prize; Pushkin Prize

Leonid Nikolaevich Maikov (Russian: Леонид Николаевич Майков; 1839–1900) was a prominent researcher in the history of Russian literature, a full member of the Saint Petersburg Academy of Sciences, president of the Russian Bibliological Society, Privy Councillor; the son of the painter Nikolay Maykov, the younger brother of Apollon, Valerian and Vladimir Maykov.

== Biography ==
Maykov was born on April 9, 1839. He studied at the boarding school of Count Suzor and the 2nd Saint Petersburg Gymnasium and in 1860 graduated from the course of Saint Petersburg University as a candidate of the historical and philological faculty and for some time taught at the gymnasium of the Human–Loving Society. In the same year he was enlisted in the Foreign Trade Department of the Ministry of Finance.

In 1863 Maykov defended his thesis for a master's degree in Russian literature titled "On the Epics of the Vladimir Cycle", in which he proposed a historical point of view on the origin of epics: he indicated, in particular, that the epics of the Vladimirov cycle are a reflection of the Kiev specific period. Maykov did not last long in the Ministry of Finance and in 1864 he moved to the Central Statistical Committee and took an active part in its work until 1892, as well as in international statistical congresses. From 1868, Maykov worked as a professor at the Saint Petersburg Archaeological Institute.

In 1882 he was appointed assistant director of the Imperial Public Library. In 1889 he was elected an academician, in 1893 he was appointed vice president of the Academy of Sciences. By virtue of his rank of vice president, he was chairman of the Emperor Nicholas II Foundation to assist writers and scholars.

Maykov became a member of the Russian Geographical Society in 1864. Inn 1871 he headed the ethnographic department, in 1872–1886 he was the chairman of the ethnographic department and edited several of its publications, including five volumes of "Notes on the Ethnography Department". He was also a member of the Archaeographic Commission of the Moscow Archaeological Society from 1876, becoming ruler of affairs in 1892 and chairman in 1899. From 1868 to 1882 he was an assistant editor of the Journal of the Ministry of Education and from 1882 to 1890 editor.

Markov also began his literary activities as a student, posting a long series of historical and literary articles and reviews in Domestic Notes, Dawn, Russian Herald, Ancient and New Russia, Russian Antiquity, Russian Archive, Journal of the Ministry of Public Education, Historical Bulletin, Russian Philological Bulletin and others.

The most important of them are devoted to Simeon Polotsky, Lomonosov, Vasily Maykov, Sumarokov, Krylov, the history of Russian journalism, the ancient Russian story, the history of Russian superstitions and are collected under the title Essays from the History of Russian Literature of the 17th and 18th Centuries (Saint Petersburg, 1889, 1893).

Markov separately published Materials and Research on Ancient Russian Literature (1890–1891).

In 1889, Maykov edited a compilation of works by Konstantin Batyushkov with the assistance of Vladimir Saitov).

In 1891, he edited and characterized the collection of critical experiences of his brother Valerian.

In his master's thesis, Maykov showed significant scientific independence. In an era of almost undivided domination of the mythological explanation of folk poetry, he put forward a historical point of view on the origin of Russian epics, which is still respected by scholars. In Maykov's opinion, the Russian epic is a true echo of Russian historical life, and, in particular, the epics of the Vladimirov cycle, the Kiev specific period. Many heroes of epics – Dobrynya, Alyosha Popovich, Sadko, Ilya Muromets – the author, comparing the annals, considers them to be truly existing; in household details, he indicates traces of the actual historical life of 10th–13th centuries. Epics arose, in his opinion, among the squads.

Maykov died on April 20, 1900. He was buried in Saint Petersburg at the Novodevichy Cemetery.

== Main works ==
- Leonid Maykov. Great Russian Spells – Saint Petersburg: Maykov's Printing House, 1869, 164 Pages; 2nd Edition, Revised and Amended – Saint Petersburg: Publishing House of the European House, 1994
- Leonid Maykov. Batyushkov, His Life and Works. Saint Petersburg: Balashev Printing House, 1887. [10], 360 Pages; 2nd Edition, Again Revised – Saint Petersburg, 1896
- Leonid Maykov. Konstantin Batyushkov. Works: In 3 Volumes / With an Article on the Life and Works of Konstantin Batyushkov Written by Leonid Maykov and Notes Compiled by him and Vladimir Saitov – Saint Petersburg: Pompey Batyushkov, 1885–1887
- Leonid Maykov. Essays from the History of Russian Literature of the 17th and 18th Centuries – Saint Petersburg: Alexey Suvorin, 1889, 7
- Leonid Maykov. Pushkin: Biographical Materials and Historical and Literary Essays – Saint Petersburg: Longin Panteleev, 1899
- Leonid Maykov. Pushkin. Works / Prepared and Provided with Notes by Leonid Maykov – Saint Petersburg: Printing House of the Imperial Academy of Sciences, 1899. Volume 1: Lyric Poems (1812–1817). 20, 296, 421 Pages; 2nd Edition – Saint Petersburg, 1900
- Leonid Maykov. Materials for the Academic Publication of the Works of Alexander Pushkin / Collected by Leonid Maykov – Saint Petersburg: Printing House of the Imperial Academy of Sciences, 1902

== Magazine articles ==
- Leonid Maykov. Princess Maria Kantemirova (Part 1) // Russkaya Starina, 1897 – Volume 89 – No. 1 – Pages 49–69
- Leonid Maykov. Princess Maria Kantemirova (Part 2) // Russkaya Starina, 1897. No. 3 – Pages 401–417
- Leonid Maykov. Princess Maria Kantemirova (Part 3) // Russkaya Starina, 1897 – Volume 90 – No. 6 – Pages 425–451
- Leonid Maykov. Princess Maria Kantemirova (Part 3) // Russkaya Starina, 1897 – Volume 91 – No. 8 – Pages 225–253
- Leonid Maykov. Lev Yurlov and His Letter to Relatives (1743, September 11) // Russky Arkhiv, 1868 – 2nd Edition – Moscow, 1869 – Columns 1058–1064
- Leonid Maykov. Love Message of the 17th Century // Russky Arkhiv, 1881 – Book 3 – Issue 6 – Pages 385–389
- Leonid Maykov. A Note on the Shkurin Family // Russkaya Starina, 1896 – Volume 88 – No. 11 – Pages 421–422

== Sources ==
- Vladimir Volkov, Kulikova, Loginov (2006). Moscow Professors of the 18th and early 20th Centuries. Humanities and Social Sciences. Moscow: Janus–K. p. 300. ISBN 5-8037-0318-4.
- Semyon Vengerov. Leonid Nikolaevich Maykov // Brockhaus and Efron Encyclopedic Dictionary: in 86 Volumes (82 Volumes and 4 Additional) – Saint Petersburg, 1890–1907
- "Leonid Nikolaevich Maykov". List of Civilian Ranks of the First Three Classes. Corrected on October 1, 1894. Saint Petersburg: Governing Senate Printing House. 1894. p. 536.

Preceded by Evgeny Feoktistov	Ministry of Education Magazine Editor; 1883–1890	Succeeded by Vasily Vasilievsky
Preceded by Yakov Grot	Vice President, Saint Petersburg Academy of Sciences; 1893–1900	Succeeded by Victor Rosen
Preceded by Athanasius Bychkov	Chairman of the Archaeographic Commission; 1899–1900	Succeeded by Sergey Sheremetev
