= Fyodor Tolstoy (adventurer) =

Russian nobleman and adventurer (1782–1846)

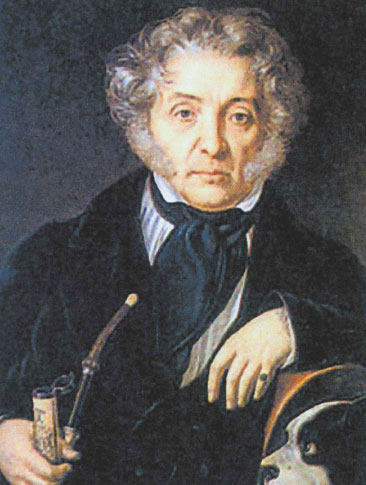
Fyodor Tolstoy in his later years, by Philip Reichel, 1846.

Count Fyodor Ivanovich Tolstoy (Russian: Фёдор Ива́нович Толсто́й; 17 February 1782 – 5 November 1846), also known as "the American", was a Russian nobleman from the well-known Tolstoy family. Possessed of an unusual temper, he became famous for his gambling, his passion for duels, and his supposed voyage to North America, from which he earned his nickname. He was acquainted with many famous authors of his period and served as a prototype for some of the characters in their works.

== Life ==
=== Childhood and youth ===
Tolstoy was one of seven children of Count Ivan Andreyevich Tolstoy (1747–1811) and his wife Anna Fyodorovna, who came from the Maikov family. Fyodor Tolstoy's place of birth is not known for certain; most likely he was born on the ancestral estate of the Tolstoys near Kologriv.

Despite their high rank, the Tolstoys were at that time relatively poor, the result of a conflict with the authorities in the eighteenth century in which several members of the family were exiled or deprived of property. In order to ensure worthy careers for their sons, it was common in the Tolstoy family to send them to military schools. Thus, Fyodor Tolstoy, along with both his brothers, were educated at the Naval Cadet Corps in Saint Petersburg.

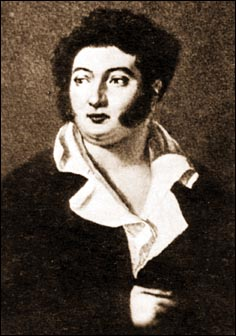
A young Tolstoy

While still a boy Tolstoy possessed, according to the memoirs of his contemporaries, an uncommon physical strength, endurance, and dexterity, which fulfilled the necessary prerequisites for a successful military career. At the same time, he already had an unpredictable, even cruel personality. In the cadet corps he mastered shooting and fencing, which made him an extremely dangerous opponent in duels. Upon finishing school Tolstoy went into service not in the navy, but in the elite Preobrazhensky regiment, perhaps owing to the assistance of influential relatives.

His comrades at that time, among others, the future literary critic Faddei Bulgarin, described Tolstoy as an excellent shooter and a brave fighter. According to their memoirs, he had an energetic and passionate personality, but while fighting he was cool and resolute. His "wild" character, along with his taste for women and card games, gave him frequent cause for arguments with his comrades and higher officers that often ended in a violation of discipline. Moreover, Tolstoy was very rancorous and vengeful towards those who happened to anger him.

Among the nobility of early nineteenth-century Russia, excessive bravery and a deliberate search for dangerous adventures was widespread and highly valued, not only on the front, but also in daily life. As a result, duels remained very popular during this period and often arose out of the smallest arguments. This societal influence, as well as the individual traits of Tolstoy's character, explains his enthusiasm for duels. In 1799, at the age of 17, he fought his first duel with an officer who had reprimanded him for a violation of discipline. The details of this duel are unknown. There are also no reliable witnesses as to Tolstoy's punishment; several memoirs allege that he was demoted to the rank of a soldier, but other sources contradict this information.

=== World tour ===
In 1803 Tolstoy went on a circumnavigation of the world as a member of the sloop Nadezhda ("Hope"), captained by Adam Johann von Krusenstern. This was the first circumnavigation of the world made by a ship under a Russian flag. How Tolstoy, who did not serve in the navy, came to be aboard the ship is unknown. Marya Kamenskaya, the daughter of his cousin, the subsequently famous artist Fyodor Petrovich Tolstoy, writes in her memoirs that Tolstoy in this way cleverly avoided punishment in the Preobrazhensky regiment. According to Kamenskaya, he posed as his cousin and namesake, who was on the crew of the ship but who did not wish to sail because he suffered from seasickness.

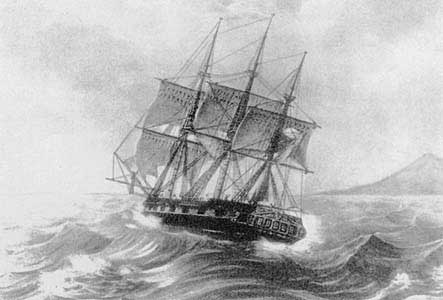
The sloop Nadezhda

The ship Nadezhda, as well as the accompanying sloop Neva under the command of Yuri Lisyansky, set sail in August 1803 from Kronstadt. In addition to its exploratory goals, the expedition was also meant to help establish diplomatic and economic relations between Russia and Japan, for which the party included a large diplomatic delegation headed by Nikolai Rezanov. Nadezhda took a route across the Baltic Sea and the Atlantic Ocean, past the Canary Islands and Brazil, after which the ship rounded Cape Horn and set across the Pacific Ocean towards Japan, making stops at the Marquesas and the Sandwich (Hawaiian) Islands, and also at Kamchatka. After visiting Japan, Nadezhda and Neva set off towards Sitka, Alaska, sailed past China and Macao on the Indian Ocean, then rounded Africa and came back across the Baltic Sea to Kronstadt. The voyage lasted a total of more than three years, from August 7, 1803, to August 19, 1806.

Tolstoy's behavior on board, where he was unencumbered by official duties, was very unpredictable. He often provoked quarrels with other members of the team, including the captain himself. In addition, Tolstoy permitted himself some japes when addressing members of the crew that he did not like: for example, once he intoxicated the priest accompanying the Neva, and when the latter lay unconscious drunk on the floor, Tolstoy stuck his beard to the deck boards with sealing wax. When the priest came to, he was obliged to cut off his beard to free himself. On another occasion, when Krusenstern was gone from his cabin, Tolstoy sneaked into his cabin with a ship's pet, an orangutan that Tolstoy had bought while the ship was moored on an island in the Pacific Ocean. He took Krusenstern's logbook, put a blank sheet of paper on top and began to show the ape how to cover the paper with ink. Then he left the orangutan alone in the cabin, who went on drawing on the notebook. When Krusenstern returned, all his records had already been destroyed.

Similar behavior more than once caused Tolstoy to be put under arrest. Finally, Krusenstern lost patience and abandoned the passenger during a stop at Kamchatka. Further details of Tolstoy's travels are known only through his own not always credible accounts. From Kamchatka Tolstoy reportedly managed to get to one of the Aleutian Islands or to Sitka island, where he spent several months among Alaskan natives of the Tlingit tribe. He acquired multiple tattoos, which he later displayed with pride to curious acquaintances. The afore-mentioned orangutan, which was left on land with Tolstoy and whose later fate is unknown, gave rise to a great deal of gossip in aristocratic circles. According to one of the rumors, during his stay in Kamchatka, Tolstoy lived together with the ape; according to others, he ate it.

At any rate, Tolstoy's return to European Russia via the Far East, Siberia, the Urals and the Volga Region, was probably full of adventures, the details of which only Tolstoy knew. According to his accounts, a merchant ship picked him up in Alaska and dropped him off at Petropavlovsk, from where Tolstoy wound his way overland to Petersburg on carts, on sleighs, and partly on foot. One of the few written testimonies of this odyssey is found in the "Notes" of the writer Philip Vigel, which only resurfaced in 1892. Vigel, who traveled around Russia at the beginning of the nineteenth century to study Russian daily life, met Tolstoy in Udmurtia and described this episode in the following way: "At one of the stations we were surprised to see an officer approach us in a uniform of the Preobrazhensky Corps. This was Count F. I. Tolstoy . . . . He was traveling around the world with Krusenstern and Rezanov, quarreled with all, drove all to quarrel, and as a dangerous person was put ashore at Kamchatka and made his way across land back to Petersburg. What hasn't been said about him . . . ."

Tolstoy's voyage concluded with his arrival in Petersburg at the beginning of August 1805. Thanks to his adventures, which gave rise to much gossip in high society, the count acquired an almost legendary celebrity, as well as the lifelong nickname "the American", referring his stay in Russian America.

=== War ===
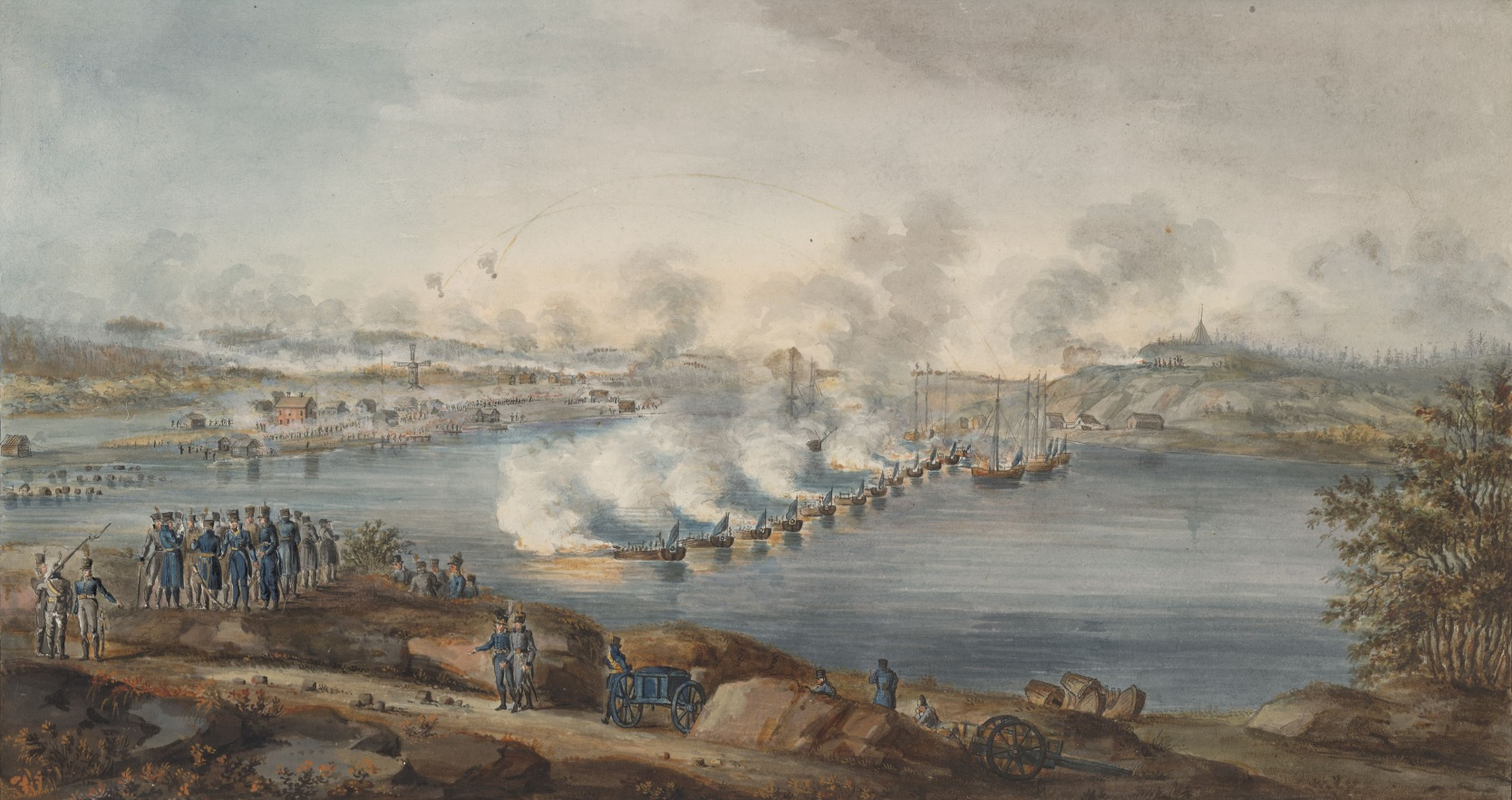
Battle of Ratan and Sävar, near Umeå

Immediately upon Tolstoy's arrival in Petersburg, he was greeted with new problems: he was arrested at the city gates and sent to the guardhouse. Moreover, a special ukase from Alexander I forbade him from entering the capital.

Tolstoy's scandalous past also disrupted his military career. He was demoted from the elite Preobrazhensky regiment to a post in the little-known Neishlott fortress, where he served from 1805 to 1808. Philippe Vigel wrote regarding this onerous period for Tolstoy: "the punishment was severe for the brave man, who had never seen battle, especially during a time when all Europe, from west to east, had broken out in war."

Only Tolstoy's friendship with the commander Mikhail Dolgorukov helped the count in the end to get a post as an aide-de-camp on the front during the recently begun Finnish War. There Tolstoy was in his element: he actively participated in the battles, including the battle of Idensalmi, in which Dolgorukov died. A while after, Tolstoy, risking his life, headed a reconnaissance detachment during an operation of the shores of the Gulf of Bothnia, thanks to which the corps under the command of General Michael Barclay de Tolly managed to cross the ice of the gulf and occupy the city of Umeå without casualties. These feats, which facilitated Russia's rapid victory, rehabilitated Tolstoy in the eyes of the command, and from 31 October 1808 he was allowed to serve in the Preobrazhensky Regiment as a lieutenant.

A few months later, however, Tolstoy fought two more duels. In the first of these he mortally wounded his comrade and captain, whom he himself had provoked by spreading sordid rumors about his sister. A few days later there followed a duel with the young ensign Naryshkin, who had asserted that Tolstoy had cheated him in a card game; Naryshkin challenged Tolstoy to a duel and was also killed. After this, Tolstoy was for several months confined to a guardhouse in the Vyborg fortress, and on 2 October 1811 he was dismissed from the army.

Less than a year afterwards, Tolstoy returned to the war, this time as a volunteer in the defense of Moscow during the French invasion of Russia. During the Battle of Borodino, he was severely wounded in the knee. On the recommendation of General Nikolai Rayevsky, who in a letter to Field Marshal Mikhail Kutuzov mentioned Tolstoy's bravery, Tolstoy received the Cross of St. George, fourth rank. Moreover, Tolstoy was once again rehabilitated and received the rank of colonel. At the end of the war he finally left the army and settled down in Moscow.

=== In Moscow ===
From 1812 until his death Tolstoy lived most of his life in Moscow, in a house on Sivtsev Vrazhek lane. His notorious, almost heroic past earned him fame in the Moscow aristocratic circles, and Tolstoy took advantage of his celebrity. He regularly took part in noble gatherings and balls, and he himself organized several festive soirées and had a reputation as a refined gastronome. Owing to the erudition that he had gained in military school, he easily conversed with representatives of the creative intelligentsia, and became friends with many of them. Among his friends were the writers Evgeny Baratynsky, Vasily Zhukovsky, Aleksandr Griboyedov, Konstantin Batyushkov, Pyotr Vyazemsky, Denis Davydov, Nikolai Gogol, and Aleksandr Pushkin.

==== Card games and duels ====
He was smart, like a demon, and surprisingly eloquent. He loved sophisms and paradoxes, and it was hard to argue with him. Nevertheless, he was, as they say, a decent chap: he was ready for everything for a friend; he willingly helped all his pals; but he advised both friends and pals not to play cards with him, saying openly that in gambling, as in war, he knows neither friend nor brother, and whoever wants to take his money into his own pocket—from him he has the right to win money.

— Faddei Bulgarin

Tolstoy loved gambling and became particularly famous for this during his years in Moscow. He did not hide the fact that he sometimes cheated. According to the memoirs of his contemporaries, Tolstoy did not like to rely on luck during a game, preferring, by way of cardsharping, to "play for certain", since "only fools rely on luck", as he himself liked to say. A. N. Vulf recounts that once when Pushkin met Tolstoy playing cards, he remarked upon his cheating, to which Tolstoy replied, "Yes, I know that myself, but I do not like to be reminded of it." Partly owing to his cheating, Tolstoy often won large sums of money, which he in general spent rapidly and capriciously on society life. At other times Tolstoy became the victim of other cardsharps and suffered great losses.

Even more famous was Tolstoy's participation in a number of duels, the reasons for which were often found in card games. It is unknown how many duels Tolstoy fought in his life, but some accounts state that he killed eleven men altogether in duels. For Tolstoy, duels were evidently not only a way of vindicating his honor—as was accepted in officers' circles in Russia—but also an ordinary pastime. Once Tolstoy had to serve as a second in the duel of one of his closest friends. Fearing for the life of his friend, Tolstoy decided to intervene to prevent the worst: before the duel was held, he himself challenged his friend's opponent and killed him. Leo Tolstoy, the first cousin once removed of Fyodor, whom he knew from his early childhood, used to recount this event.

==== Personal life ====
In his early years in Moscow, Tolstoy's love affairs provided copious material for rumor and gossip in society. He married the gypsy dancer Avdotya Tugayeva on January 10, 1821, but only after having lived with her for several years. Marya Kamenskaya's memoirs explain the reason for this marriage:

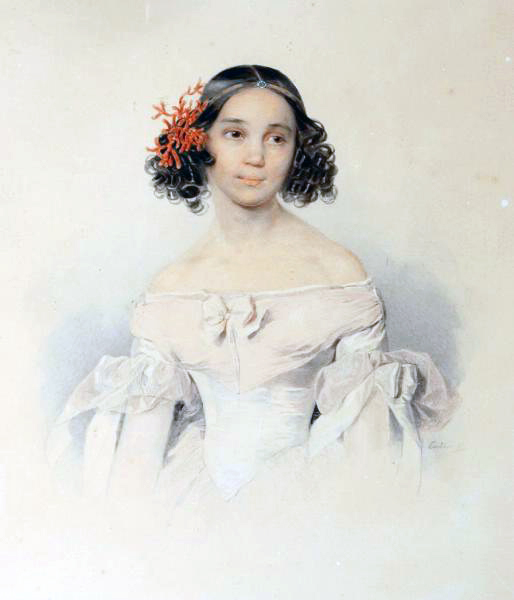
Sarra, Tolstoy's daughter

Once, having lost a large sum in the English Club, he was going to have his name on the black board (a list of shirkers) for not having paid his loss in time. He did not want to suffer this disgrace and decided to shoot himself. His gypsy, seeing his excited state, began to question him:

"Why are you troubling me", said F. I., "how can you help me? They'll put me on the black board, and I cannot endure that. Clear out!"

Avdotya Maksimovna did not let him alone, found out how much money he needed, and the next day brought him the needed sum.

"Where did you get the money?" Tolstoy was surprised.

"From you yourself. You gave me little; I hid it all. Now take it, it's yours.

F. I. was deeply moved and got married to his gypsy.

—

This marriage lasted until Tolstoy's death. Tugayeva gave birth to twelve children, however, only one reached the age of maturity: their daughter Praskovya Fyodorovna, who lived until 1887. Tolstoy and Tugayeva's eldest daughter, Sarra, possessed of a poetic gift, but unhealthy both physically and mentally, died at the age of 17 of consumption. All the other children were born dead or died in infancy.

==== Relationship with Pushkin ====
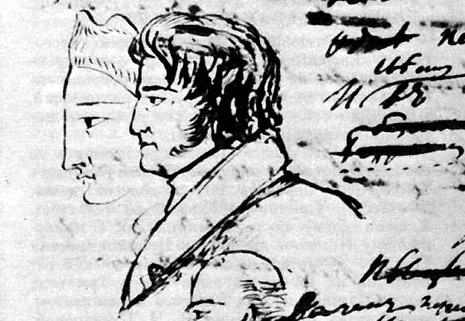
Fyodor Tolstoy, in a drawing by Pushkin

One of the best-known aspects of Count Tolstoy's life in Moscow was his not always friendly relationship with the poet Aleksandr Pushkin. Pushkin and Tolstoy met for the first time in the spring of 1819.

A notorious quarrel between them began in 1820 after Pushkin fell into disgrace because of his poems and was exiled to Ekaterinoslav, then to the Caucasus, Crimea and Bessarabia. During this time Tolstoy spread a rumor in Moscow, intentionally or unintentionally, that Pushkin was flogged by the police before his departure into exile. Hearing about this false rumor, the temperamental and sensitive Pushkin was so offended that he swore to challenge Tolstoy to a duel upon his return from exile. Moreover, the poet answered Tolstoy with the epigram "В жизни мрачной и презренной…" ("In a gloomy and despicable life...") and harsh verses in a message "To Chaadayev": "Or a philosopher, who in his early years / Amazed the world with his depravity, / But, becoming enlightened, made amends for his disgrace: / He quit drinking wine and became a cardsharp?" It is curious that when, during the publication of the poem, the words "or a philosopher" (или философа) were changed to "a fool-philosopher" (глупца-философа), Pushkin strongly objected: "'A fool-philosopher' is printed; why a fool? The poem refers to the American Tolstoy, who is not a fool at all".

While in exile, Pushkin assiduously prepared himself for the duel, practicing his shooting on a regular basis. On September 8, 1826, almost immediately after returning to Moscow, he sent Tolstoy his challenge. The duel was prevented then only by Tolstoy's accidental absence from Moscow.

A while later the known bibliographer and friend of Pushkin Sergei Sobolevsky managed to reconcile Pushkin with Tolstoy. Tolstoy was possibly also interested in reconciliation, as he knew that killing Pushkin would probably cut off his relations with many famous poets whose friendship he valued. In subsequent years Tolstoy and Pushkin even became friends. Thus in 1829, Pushkin entrusted Tolstoy with the delivery of a letter to Tolstoy's acquaintance and Pushkin's future mother-in-law, Natalya Nikolayevna Goncharova, in which he declared himself a suitor for the hand of her 17-year-old daughter Natalya. Although the elder Goncharova could not give Pushkin a definite answer, Pushkin eventually succeeded in his suit, and in 1831, he and Natalya were married.

==== Final years ====
Tolstoy suffered greatly from the death of his children, especially when his eldest daughter, Sarra, died at the age of seventeen. Some of Tolstoy's friends recounted later that by the end of his life grew devout and considered the death of his eleven children to be God's punishment for his killing of eleven men in duels.

He counted eleven men whom he had killed in duels. He carefully noted the names of the killed in his diary. He had twelve children, who all died in youth, except for two daughters. As each child died, he would cross out a name of one person he had killed and wrote on the side the word "quit" (repaid). When he had lost his eleventh child, a charming and clever girl, he crossed out the last of the names of the killed and said, "Well, thank God, at least my curly-haired gipsy girl will live."

During this time, Tolstoy no longer fought duels and played cards only seldom. Instead, he prayed more and more, attempting to atone for the sins of his youth. Sometimes he went abroad to take the waters, spending time in various European countries.

One of Tolstoy's best-known acquaintances during these years was Aleksandr Herzen, who reminisced about Tolstoy a decade later in his book, My Past and Thoughts (Былое и думы):

I personally knew Tolstoy, at that same time (1838) when he lost his daughter Sarra, an extraordinary girl, with a high poetical gift. One glance at the old man's appearance, at his brow, covered with gray curls, at his sparkling eyes and athletic build, showed how much energy and strength nature had given to him. He developed only wild passions, only bad propensities, and that is not surprising; all that is depraved is allowed to develop in us for a long time without hindrance, but for human passions we are sent to a garrison or to Siberia at the first step...

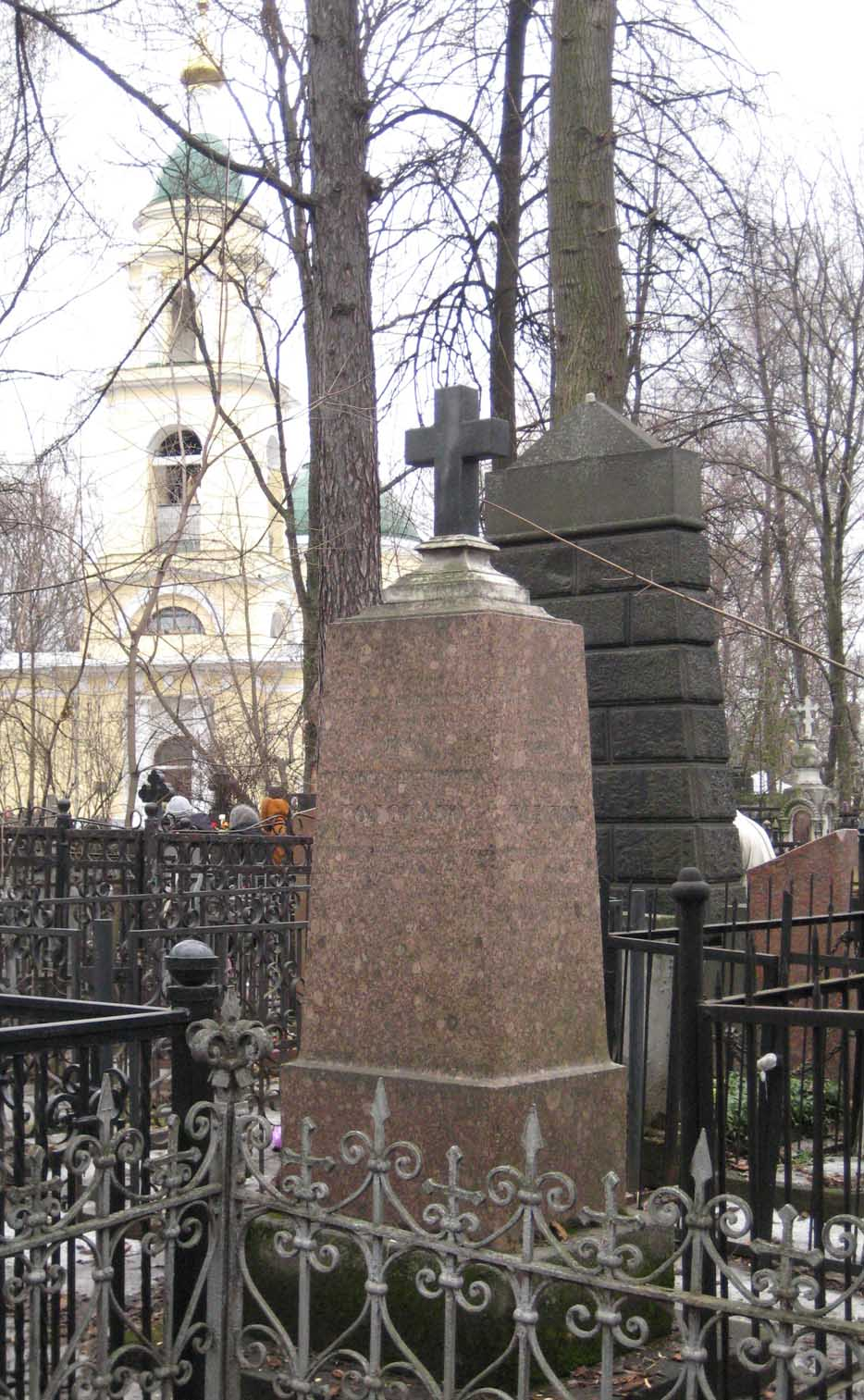
Tolstoy's grave in the Vagankovo Cemetery

Tolstoy died on November 5, 1846, after a short illness, in his Moscow home in the presence of his wife and only surviving daughter Praskovya. According to the recollections of his close friends, before his death he summoned a priest and confessed to him for several hours. Tolstoy was buried in the Vagankavo Cemetery. His widow Avdotya outlived him by fifteen years and died a violent death: she was stabbed by her own cook in 1861. The Tolstoys' house on Sivtsev Vrazhek near the old Arbat was not preserved: it was destroyed in the 1950s to make way for the "Kremlin" clinic.

== Fyodor Tolstoy in literature ==
=== Pushkin ===
Owing to his notorious past and to his close acquaintance with many authors, Tolstoy became the prototype for some of the characters in their books, the most famous of whom was Aleksandr Pushkin. In his novel in verse Eugene Onegin (1823–1831) Tolstoy appears as the duellist Zaretsky, Lensky's second in his duel with the main character, Onegin. Pushkin depicts Zaretsky/Tolstoy in the following way:

Five versts or so from Krasnogórie,
Lensky's estate, there lives and still
thrives to this moment, in a station
of philosophic isolation,
Zarétsky, sometime king of brawls
and hetman of the gambling-halls,
arch-rake, pothouse tribune-persona,
but now grown plain and kind in stead,
paterfamilias (unwed),
unswerving friend, correct landowner,
and even honourable man:
so, if we want to change, we can!

These lines show that Pushkin had made peace with Tolstoy: Pushkin refers to him as an "honorable man", who has transformed from an "arch-rake" into a "paterfamilias", with, however, the label "unwed"—an allusion to his long-lasting ménage with the gypsy Tugayeva. Further on in the story, Pushkin displays his friendship with Tolstoy:

He was no fool; appreciated
by my Eugene, not for his heart,
but for the effect that he created
of sense and judgement. For his part
his converse gave Onegin pleasure...

Juri Lotman agrees that fundamentally Zaretsky was based on Tolstoy, but concludes that Pushkin subjected this real prototype to a significant reworking. In particular, unlike Zaretsky, who fell off his "Kalmyk horse" and was captured, Tolstoy was an infantry officer, who was never in captivity.

=== Griboyedov ===
The other famous poet who used Tolstoy as a model was Alexander Griboyedov. In his comedy Woe from Wit the character Repetilov refers to Tolstoy in a monologue, calling him a "nighttime robber and duellist" with "unclean hands", who was "exiled to Kamchatka and came back as an Aleutian". Tolstoy himself wrote corrections into one of the manuscripts. He modified the phrase "he was exiled to Kamchatka" to "the devil took him to Kamchatka", noting that he was never exiled, and limited the line about "unclean hands" to include "at cards", remarking that "for a true likeness these corrections are necessary, so that people will not think, that [this character] steals snuffboxes from tables". Tolstoy also accused Griboyedov of implying that he was a bribetaker. When Griboyedov objected, saying "but you do play unfairly, after all", Tolstoy responded, "Only that? Well you should have written it that way."

Tolstoy loved to dwell on this line, bringing it up on many occasions. At one of the first performances of Woe from Wit, Tolstoy, who was seated in the audience, stood up after Repetilov's speech and shouted, "I never took bribes, because I never served [in the government]!", a quip that was greeted with applause.

== Notes and references ==
Tolstoy was also most likely used as a model for the cruel and bloodthirsty duellist Dolokhov, who fights Pierre Bezukhov in War and Peace.

== Bibliography ==
=== English ===
- Robinson, Harlow. "Six Centuries of Tolstoys". Review of Twenty-Four Generations of Russian History, 1353–1983, by Nikolai Tolstoy. New York Times Book Review, November 6, 1983.
- Tolstoy, Il'ia L'vovich. Reminiscences of Tolstoy. Translated by George Calderon. Charlottesville, Virginia: University of Virginia Library, 1997. http://www.netLibrary.com/urlapi.asp?action=summary&v=1&bookid=2011192.
- Tolstoy, Nikolai. The Tolstoys : Twenty-Four Generations of Russian history, 1353–1983. London: H. Hamilton, 1983.

=== Russian ===
- Bondi, Sergei Mikhailovich, Chernoviki Pushkina, Moscow: Prosveschchenie, 1971.
- Lotman, Yuri Mikhailovich, Besedy o russkoi kul'ture : byt i traditsii russkogo dvorianstva XVIII-nachalo XIX veka. Saint Petersburg: Iskusstvo-SPB, 1994.
- Polikovskii, Aleksei. Graf Bezbrezhnyi: dve zhizni grafa Fedora Ivanovicha Tolstogo-Amerikantsa. Moscow: Minuvshee, 2006.
- Tolstoy, Sergei Lvovich, Fiodor Tolstoi-Amerikanets. https://web.archive.org/web/20061009035753/http://vivovoco.rsl.ru/VV/PAPERS/ECCE/CRAZY.HTM
