= Mikhail Semevsky =

Russian historian

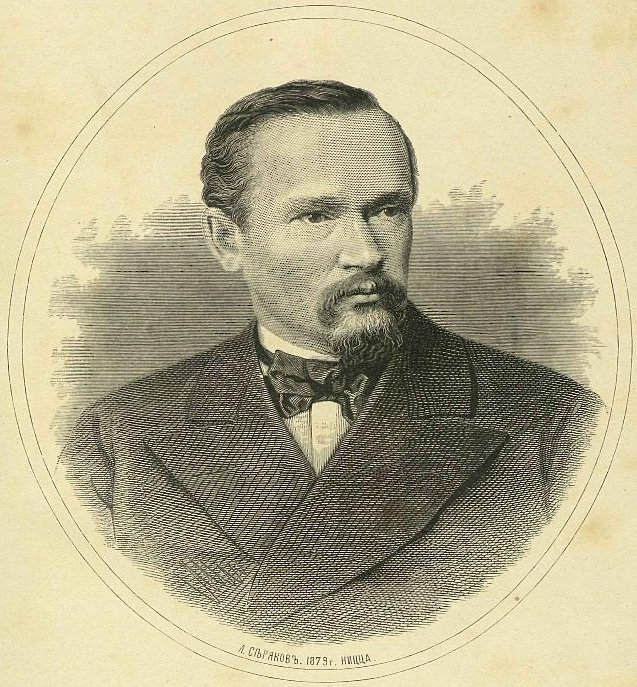
Mikhail Semevsky in 1879

Mikhail Ivanovich Semevsky (Russian: Михаил Иванович Семевский; 1837–92) was a Russian Imperial amateur historian who focused on the era of palace revolutions, and the history of the 18th century Russia.

Of noble birth, Semevsky received a military education in St. Petersburg and did not retire from civil service until 1882. He assembled the memoirs of no less than 850 individuals, many written on his own request. Semevsky published them through Herzen's Free Russian Press in London, before establishing the Russkaya Starina monthly in 1870.

His younger brother, Vasily Semevsky (1849-1916), was a historian of Narodnik bend. The Russkaya Starina was published under Vasily's auspices until 1877, although the printing press was effectively run by Mikhail, until his death in 1892.

== Biography ==
- Тимощук В. В. М. И. Семевский, основатель и редактор исторического журнала «Русская старина». Его жизнь и деятельность. 1837—1892. Saint Petersburg, 1895.
