= Pushkin studies =

The Pushkin studies is the branch of literary criticism which researches the life and works of Aleksandr Pushkin. It was established by Pavel Annenkov and Pyotr Bartenev in the mid-19th century. The greatest flowering of the field lasted from the 1910s to the 1940s.

The Wisconsin–Madison Prof. Aleksandr Dolinin divides the modern Pushkin studies into two currents, based in the Pushkin House and in Moscow. He describes the latter as "weak", noting that it tries to follow the traditions of Russian religious philosophers from the 1st half of the 20th century.

One of the most prominent American Pushkinists was J. Thomas Shaw. The Wisconsin Center for Pushkin Studies has published The Pushkin Handbook.
