= Pyotr Bartenev =

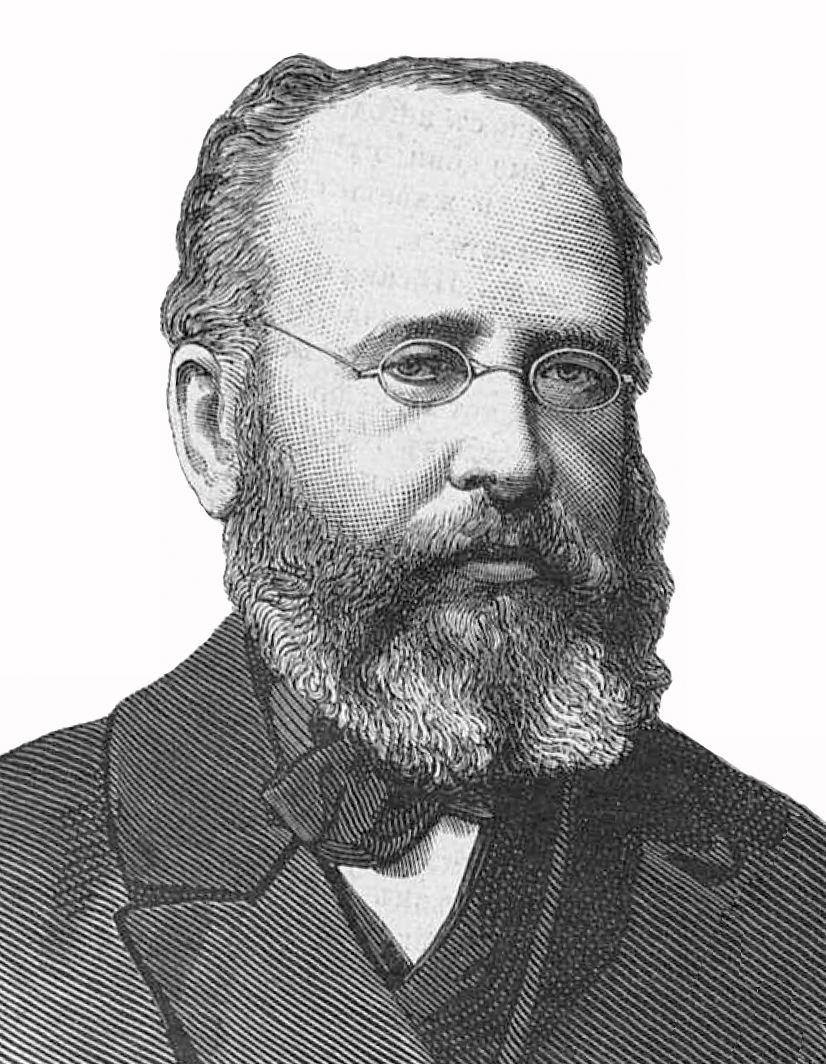

Pyotr Ivanovich Bartenev (Пётр Ива́нович Барте́нев; 13 October 1829 – 4 November 1912) was a Russian historian and collector of unpublished memoirs.

Of noble birth, Bartenev attended the Moscow University. In 1856, he undertook the first publication of the correspondence of Tsar Alexis, which brought him to the attention of the leading Slavophiles. These connections helped him secure the post of director at the Chertkov Library, then the only public library in Moscow.

At this position he consulted Leo Tolstoy on the details of the Napoleonic Wars. Tolstoy, then at work on War and Peace, said that "turning to Bartenev with a research query was like turning on the tap of a samovar".

In 1863, Bartenev founded The Russian Archive, the first history journal in Russia. Like its rival, Old Times in Russia, Bartenev's journal brought to light scores of unknown documents and memoirs from the 18th and early 19th centuries. Prince Vorontsov's entire family archive was published in 40 volumes as a supplement to this periodical.

Bartenev is perhaps best remembered today as the founder of the Pushkin studies. He collected numerous testimonials relating to Alexander Pushkin, from his relatives and friends. Bartenev and Pavel Annenkov represent the first generation of amateur Pushkinists.
