= Evgeniya Maykova =

Russian writer

Evgeniya Petrovna Maykova
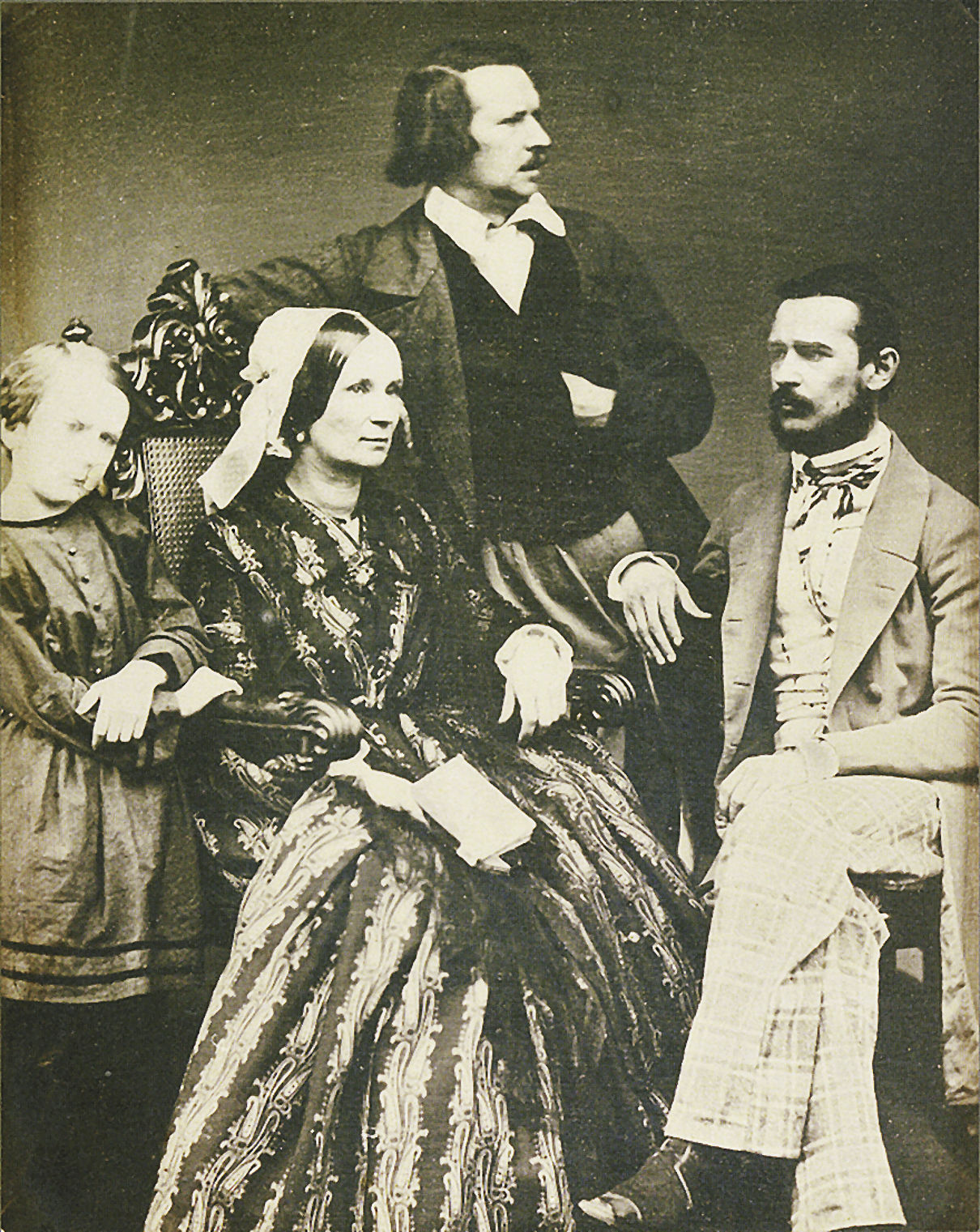
- Petrovna with her husband and two sons, Leonid and Valerian (1847)
- Born: Evgeniya Petrovna Gusyatnikova; 17 December 1803
- Died: 19 June 1880 (aged 76); Saint Petersburg, Russian Empire
- Citizenship: Russian
- Occupation: Writer
- Spouse: Nikolay Maykov (m. 1820; died 1873)

Evgeniya Petrovna Maykova (née Gusyatnikova, 29 December 1803 – 1 July 1880) was a Russian writer and poet. She was also the mistress of a literary salon. She was married to Nikolay Maykov and the mother of Apollon, Valerian, Vladimir, and Leonid.

== Biography ==
Evgeniya Petrovna Gusyatnikova was born on 29 December 1803 into a large family of a merchant–gold miner Peter Gusyatnikov from his second marriage. She spent her childhood and youth in Moscow. Having lost her father early, she was raised by her mother, a Lutheran of Prussian origin, Natalya Ivanovna. She received a good home education. "A slender beautiful brunette, with an oblong aristocratic face", young Gusyatnikova was a wealthy bride. On 30 July 1820, she married a poor retired hussar, Nikolai Maykov (1794–1873). Their wedding was in Moscow in the Exaltation of the Cross Church in the former Holy Cross Monastery. The couple lived either in Moscow in the house of the Gusyatnikovs, or in the suburbs, in the Maykov Estate in the village of Nikolsky near the Trinity–Sergius Lavra.

Since 1834, the Maikovs lived permanently in Saint Petersburg, where in the 1830 and 1840s there was a literary salon in their house. They constantly gathered writers, musicians and artists: Ivan Goncharov, Vladimir Benediktov, Pyotr Ershov, Ivan Turgenev, Nikolai Nekrasov and others. In 1846, Fyodor Dostoevsky met the Maykovs. For many years, Evgeniya Petrovna was the center of an artistic and creative circle of family and friends. She actively participated in the Maykovs' handwritten editions: in the magazine Snowdrop (1835, 1836, 1838) and the almanac Moonlight Nights (1839). Possessing a literary gift, she wrote poems and novels. Under the signatures in the 1840s–1850s, she was published in the magazines Library for Reading and Family Circle, and in the early 1860s in the magazine Snowdrop.

According to others, Maykova was "an excellent, smart, kind woman". "Such women are not often found", wrote Ivan Goncharov, who appreciated her literary judgments. Vladimir Benediktov treated Maykova with great reverence and dedicated poems to her. She died in June 1880, and was buried next to her husband at the Novodevichy Cemetery in Saint Petersburg.

== Sources ==
- Maykova, Evgeniya Petrovna // Encyclopedic Dictionary of Brockhaus and Efron: In 86 Volumes (82 Volumes and 4 Additional Ones) – Saint Petersburg, 1890–1907
