= Nikolay Maykov =

Russian painter (1794–1873)

Nikolay Apollonovich Maykov
- Николай Аполлонович Майков
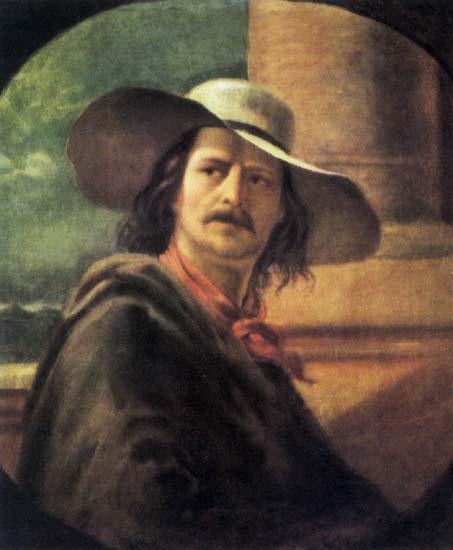
- Self-portrait (1830s)
- Born: August 28, 1794; Moscow, Russia
- Died: August 23, 1873 (aged 78); Saint Petersburg, Russia
- Resting place: Novodevichy Cemetery, St. Petersburg
- Known for: Painting
- Style: Academism; Romanticism
- Spouse: Evgeniya Gusyatnikova (m. 1820)
- Children: 5, including Apollon Maykov
- Elected: Member Academy of Arts (1835)

Nikolay Apollonovich Maykov (Russian: Николай Аполлонович Майков; 28 August 1794, Moscow – 23 August 1873, Saint Petersburg) was a self-taught Russian portrait, history and religious painter in the Academic style.

== Biography ==
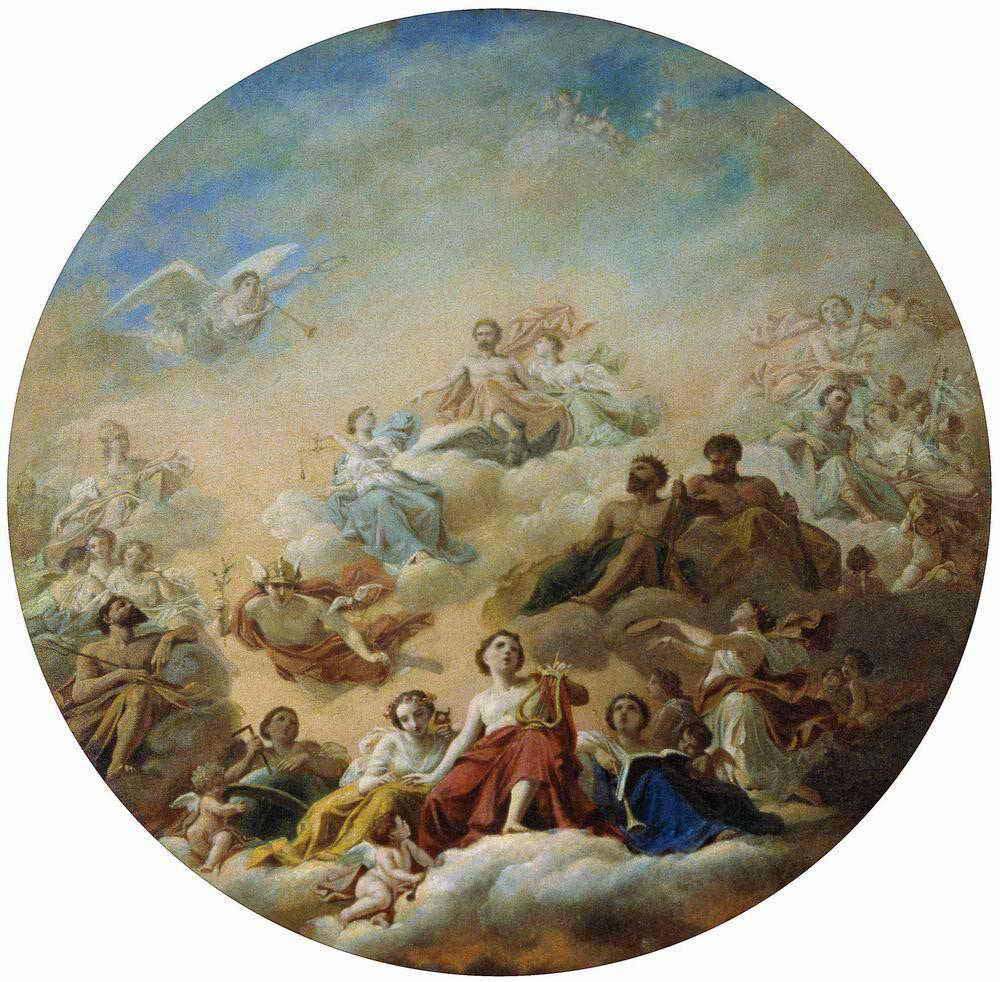
Mount Olympus

His father, Apollon Maykov, was a poet, Active State Councillor and a Director at the Imperial Theatres. In 1801, he was sent to Saint Petersburg to train and study with the Second Cadet Corps, but had not completed his courses at the time of the French Invasion in 1812. He was mustered into the Army as an officer, under the command of General Pyotr Bagration, and fought at the Battle of Borodino, where his leg was pierced by a bullet.

He went to his father's estate near Yaroslavl to recuperate. While there, he taught himself drawing to pass the time. After his recovery, he rejoined the Army to pursue Napoleon's retreating forces. During the pursuit, he made sketches whenever there was a pause in the action; all the way through Poland and Germany, into France. While in Paris, he tried his hand at oil painting and wanted to study in Italy, but his father would not provide the necessary support, so he returned to Russia, retired with the rank of Major and settled in Moscow, where he married and started a family.

He tried to improve his skills by copying famous paintings at the museums there, then moved to Saint Petersburg, so he could have access to the works at the Hermitage. Museum patrons were impressed with his work and he eventually attracted the notice of Tsar Nicholas I. On the Tsar's behalf, he created a series of images for the Trinity Cathedral. As a result, the Imperial Academy of Arts named him an "Academician" in 1835 and, on the Tsar's orders, was admitted as a member.

For over ten years, he worked on an iconostasis at Saint Isaac's Cathedral. He also created works at smaller churches throughout the region, as well as in chapels at the Winter Palace and the Yelagin Palace. He also did murals at private residences; notably at a mansion belonging to Yusupov family; now home to the St. Petersburg Institute of International Trade, Economics and Law. During these projects, he also made portraits of the aristocracy and other notables.

His sons were all accomplished: Apollon was a poet; Valerian was a literary critic; Vladimir was a publisher (notably of children's books); Leonid was a literary scholar and ethnographer.

== Selected portraits ==
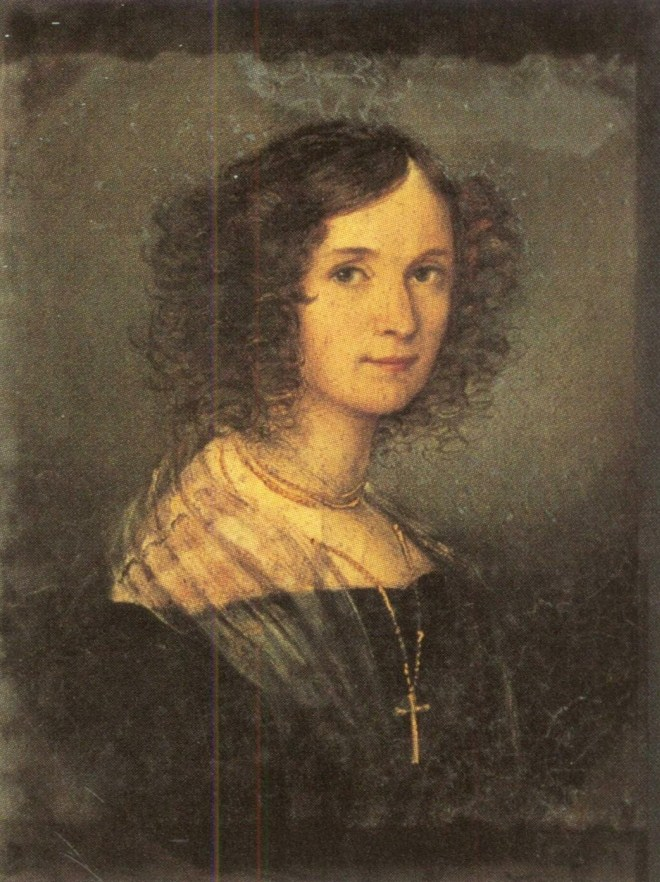
Portrait of Anna Maikova, the wife of the artist's brother

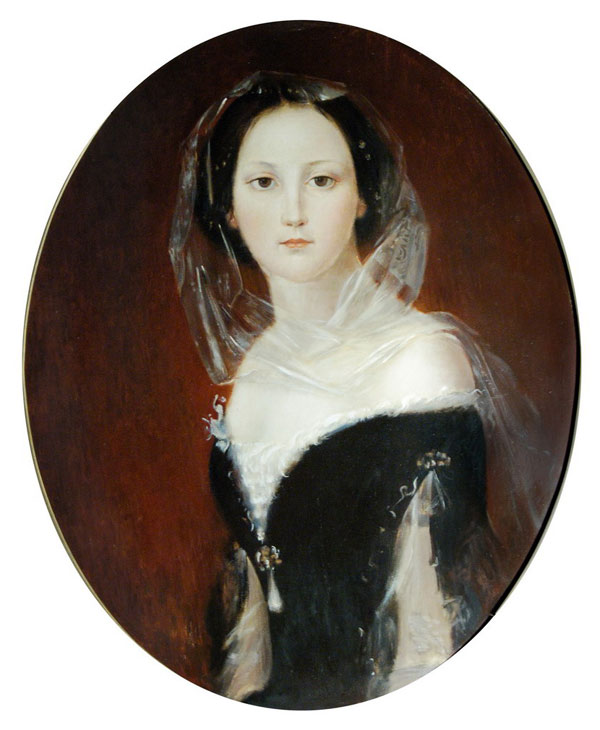
Portrait of Elizabeth Tolstoy

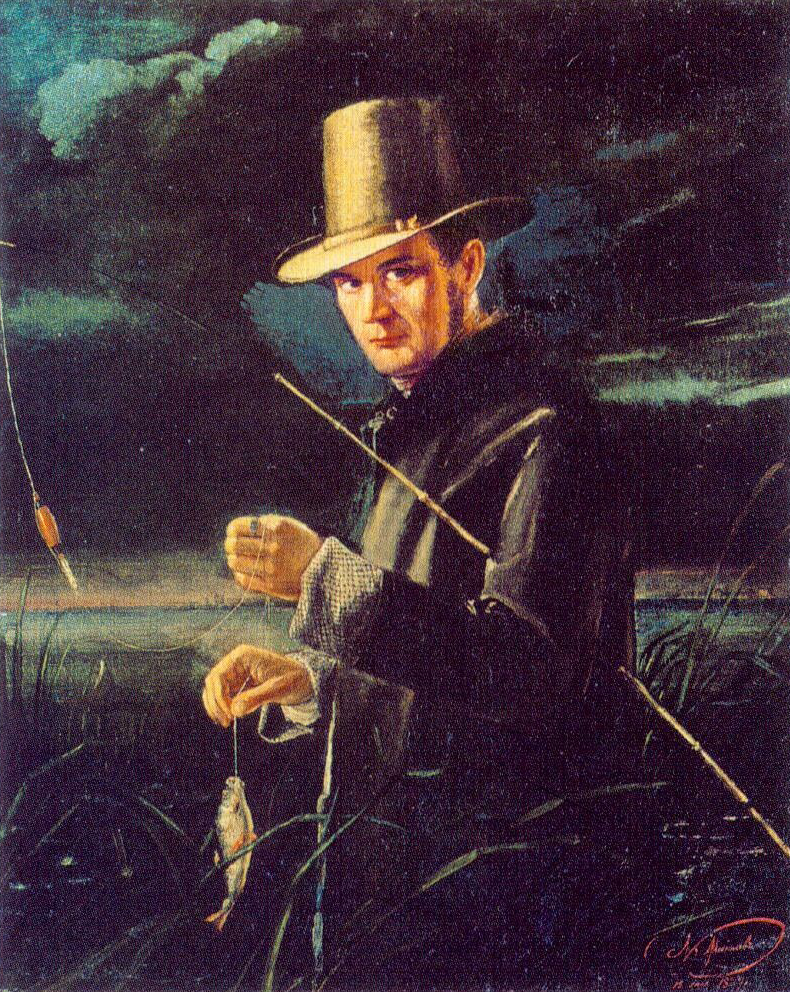
Portrait of his friend, Vladimir Solonitsyn (1804–1844), a writer and philologist

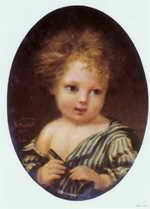
Portrait of Leonid Maikov, the artist's son, as a child

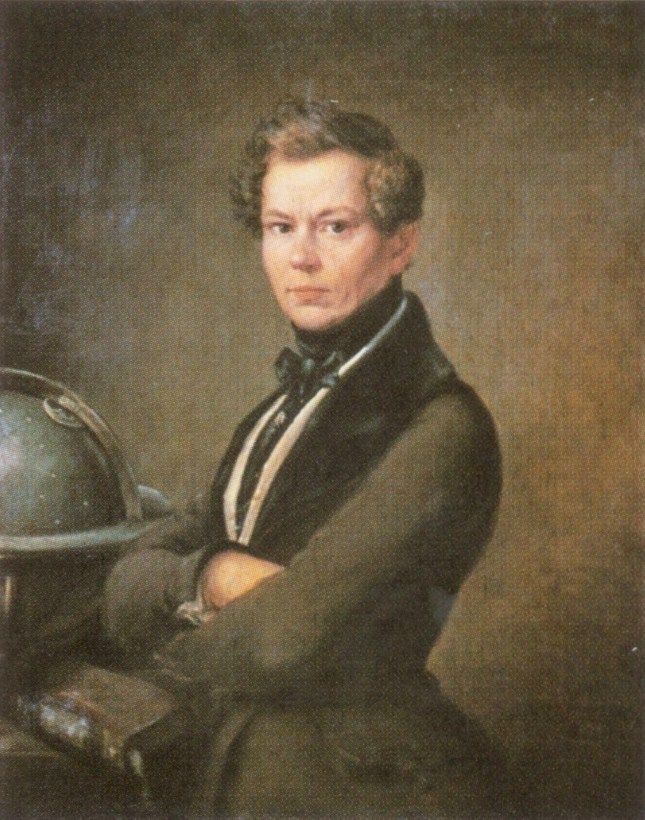
Portrait of an unknown astronomer
