= Apollon Aleksandrovich Maykov =

Russian poet and military officer

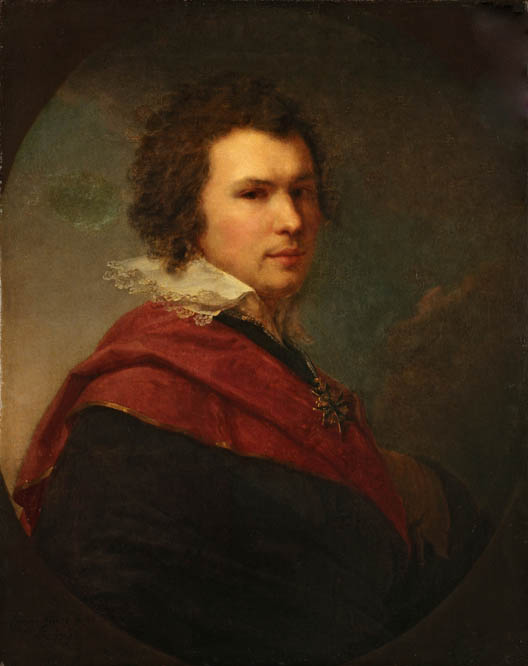
Apollon Maykov (1796), by Johann Baptist von Lampi the Younger

Apollon Aleksandrovich Maykov (Russian:Аполлон Александрович Майков, 1761 — 20 December 1838, Saint Petersburg) was a Russian poet, military officer, Active State Councillor, and a Director at the Imperial Theatres. He was from a family of notable figures, including his uncle, the poet and playwright, Vasily Maykov; his younger brother, the poet Mikhail Maykov; and his son, the painter Nikolay Maykov.

== Biography ==
His father, Aleksander, was a descendent of Nil Sorsky. His mother, Kleopatra née Telepevna, was also from a noble family. As a young man, he served in the military guards. He wrote and published his first poems in 1786. Around 1790, he married Natalia Ivanovna Serebryakova (1768–1832). They had seven sons and five daughters; two of whom died before reaching adulthood. In 1795, he was awarded the Prussian Pour le Mérite.

In 1802, he began working at the Imperial Theatre in Saint Petersburg; as a member of the "Directorate of Spectacles and Music' and head of the acting troupes. By 1806, he was in charge of the Directorate's financial affairs. According to memoirs by his associates, he was more capable at handling their finances than their repertoire.

He was appointed a manager of the Moscow theatres in 1810. During the War of 1812, he succeeded in removing the theatrical props, saving the cash drawer, and evacuating the actors, just before the French entered Moscow. As soon as they were able to return, the performances resumed. Shortly after, he was appointed a Chamberlain.

From 1821 to 1825, he served as Director of the Imperial Theatres in Saint Petersburg. As of 1823, he was a member of the Committee for Theatrical Affairs. He resigned his positions in 1825, in protest of a decision that made the Director completely subordinate to the Committee.

He later returned to Moscow, was awarded the Order of Saint Anna in 1826, and served as a 'permanent member" of the Kremlin Armoury from 1828 to 1831.

His works include numerous odes and a one-act comedy, Unsuccessful Pact, or Betrothed, But Not Married, that was staged at the Hermitage Theatre in 1794. In addition to his children by Natalia, he had two daughters and a son by Ekaterina Lukyanovna Azarevich; a dancer and former serf. Their younger daughter, Maria Azarevicheva, became a well-known actress.
