= Russkaia starina =

Russian history journal

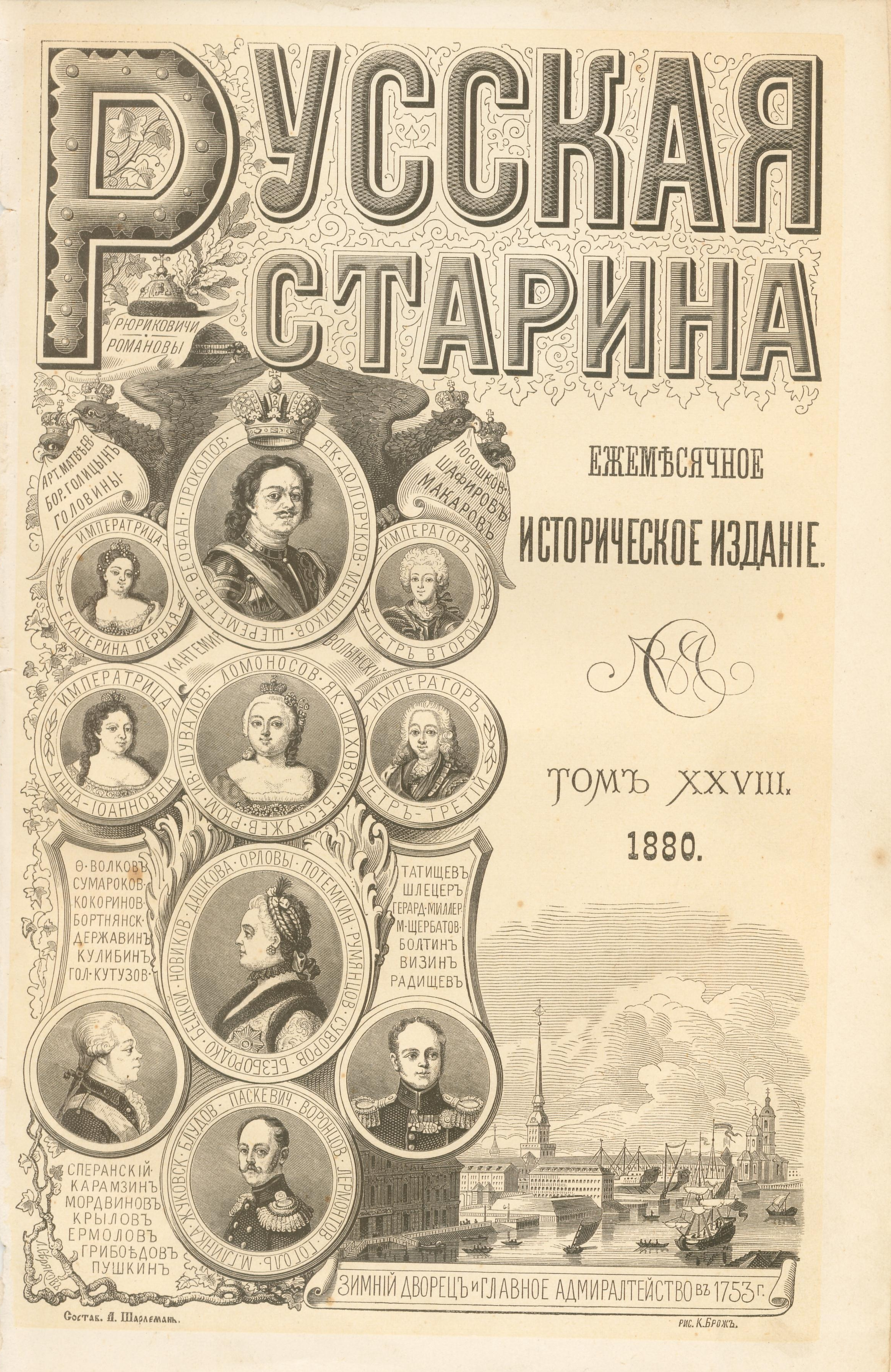
An issue of Russkaya Starina from 1880

Russkaia starina (Russian: Русская старина, pronounced [ˈruskəjə stərʲɪˈna], lit. 'Russian Antiquity') was a Russian history journal published monthly in St. Petersburg by amateur historian Mikhail Semevsky and his successors between 1870 and 1916. Its authors included Ivan Zabelin, Dmitry Ilovaysky, Nikolai Karlovich Shilder, and Mykola Kostomarov. A collected edition was reprinted in 2008.

Semevsky was highly enthusiastic about the history of 18th-century Russia. His journal covered the imperial period of Russian history, including the era of palace revolutions. It was Russkaia Starina that first brought to light the unpublished pages of Eugene Onegin and Dead Souls, Bolotov's memoirs, Kuchelbecker's diary, and many other materials long forgotten or repressed by censorship. Semevsky personally persuaded numerous old nobles and bureaucrats to put their reminiscences into writing.

In the late 1870s another amateur historian, Sergei Shubinsky, set up a rival publication, The Historical Herald.
