= Russky Arkhiv =

Russian magazine

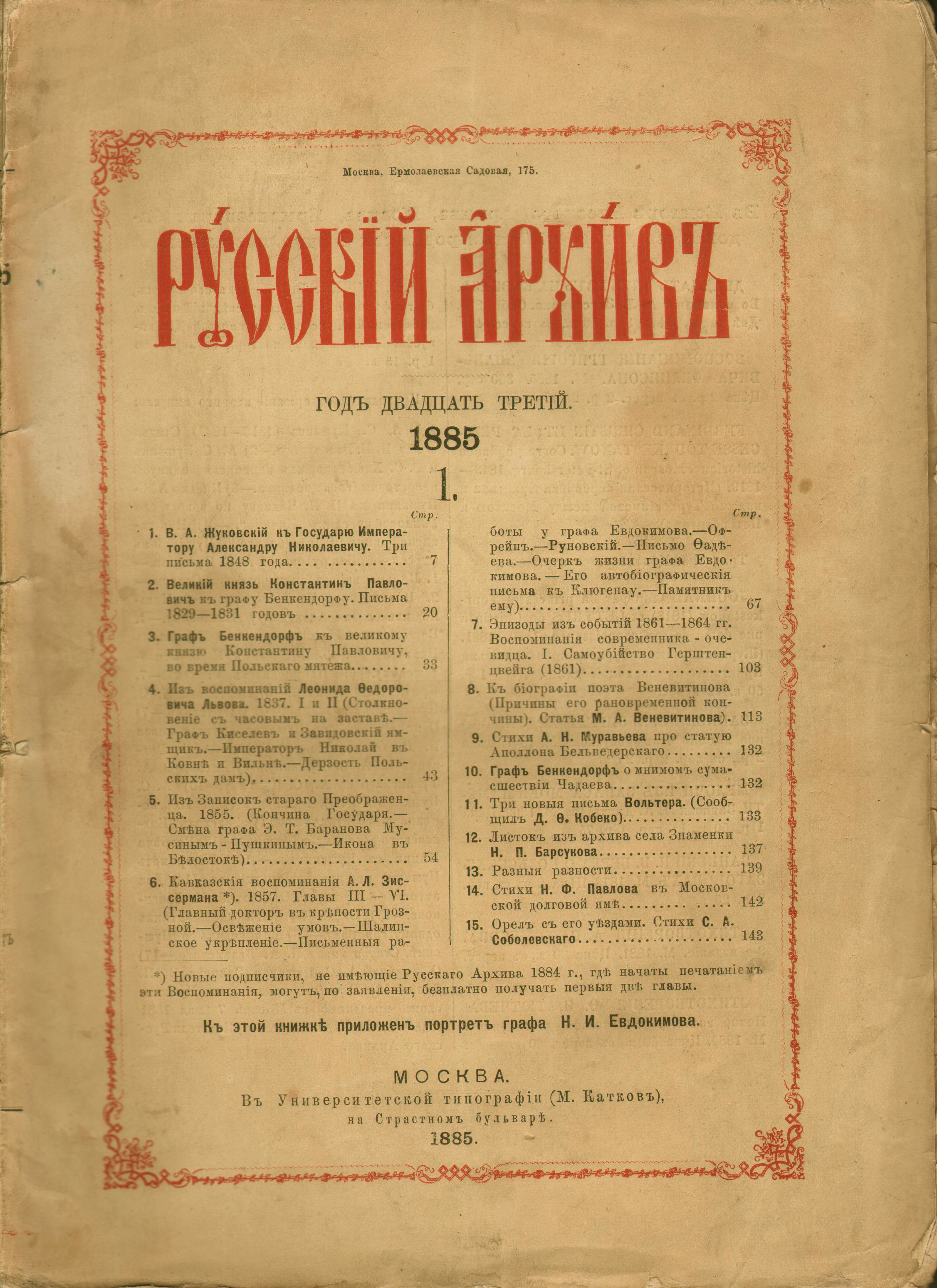
- Editor: Pyotr Bartenev
- Frequency: Monthly, fortnightly (1880-1884)
- Circulation: 1300 (maximum)
- Founded: 1863
- Final issue: 1917
- Country: Russian Empire
- Based in: Moscow
- Language: Russian

Russky Arkhiv (Russian: Русский архив/Русскій Архивъ, Russian Archives) was a Russian historical and literary monthly (in 1880–1884, a fortnightly) magazine, published in Moscow in 1863–1917. Conceived originally by Alexey Khomyakov, it was launched and edited by Pyotr Bartenev, with a view to giving its readership the full and objective account of Russian history.

In the course of its history the magazine published a host of important historical documents, including the previously unreleased archive materials, concerning correspondences, biographies, diaries, travel notes or memoirs of renowned historical figures, focusing on the history of Russian nobility of the 18th and the early 19th centuries. Almost topical for Russian Archive became the documentary analysis of the life and the work of Alexander Pushkin.

Among the historians, essayists and critics who contributed to Russky Arkhiv regularly were Yakov Grot, Mikhail Yuzefovich, Alexander Vasilchikov, Dmitry Ilovaysky, Mikhail Longinov, Leonid Maykov, Sergey Sobolevsky, Nikolai Barsukov.

Among its most valued publications were letters and diaries by numerous Decembrists, the notes of Count Henning Friedrich von Bassewitz (1713–1725), as well as Just Juel, the Danish ambassador at the Court of Peter the Great, the diaries of Pyotr Tolstoy on his 1697–1699 foreign trip, Friedrich Christian Weber's notes on Peter I's reforms, as well as the assorted diaries, memoirs and notes by Mikhail Antonovsky, Count Alexander de Ribaupierre, Nikolai Ilyinsky, Countess Edling, Count de Rochechouart, Hippolyte Auger, Nikolay Muravyov-Karsky, Count Mikhail Tolstoy, the poet Alexander Andreyev, Countess Antonina Bludova, general Grigory Filipson, the Saratov Governor Andrey Fadeyev, Baron Alexander von Nicolai, Nikolai Berg (on the Polish January Uprising), Prince Pyotr Vyazemsky (his Ostafyev Archives). The extensive memoirs by general Pavel Grabbe and playwright Stepan Zhikharev came out separately, as supplements.

Russky Arkhiv was a respectable but not massively popular publication; its circulation figures fluctuated around one thousand and never reached beyond 1300.
