= History of Russia (1721–1796) =

The history of Russia from 1721 to 1796 belongs to the era of Russian palace revolutions and the age of Catherine the Great. It began with creation of Russian Empire in 1721, the rule of Catherine I in 1725, and ended with the short rule of Peter III of Russia.

== Era of Russian palace revolutions (thematically) ==
Peter changed the rules of succession to the throne after the death of his son Aleksey, who had opposed his father's reforms and served as a rallying figure for anti-reform groups. A new law provided that the Tsar would choose his own successor, but Peter failed to do so before his death in 1725. In the decades that followed, the absence of clear rules of succession left the monarchy open to intrigues, plots, coups, and countercoups. Henceforth, the crucial factor for obtaining the throne was the support of the elite palace guard in St. Petersburg.

After Peter's death, his wife Catherine I ascended the throne. But when she died in 1727, Peter's grandson, Peter II, was crowned tsar. In 1730, Anna Ivanovna, whose father Ivan V had been co-ruler with Peter, ascended the throne. The Supreme Privy Council, a government body established by Catherine I that put Anna on the throne, attempted to impose various conditions on her. In her struggle against those restrictions, Anna had the support of other nobles who feared oligarchic rule more than autocracy. Thus the principle of autocracy continued to receive strong support despite chaotic struggles for the throne.

Anna died in 1740, and her infant grandnephew was proclaimed tsar as Ivan VI. After a series of coups, however, he was replaced by Peter the Great's daughter Elizabeth (r. 1741-1762). During Elizabeth's reign, which was much more effective than those of her immediate predecessors, a modernised Russian culture began to emerge. Among notable cultural events were the founding of Moscow University (1755) and the Academy of Fine Arts (1757), along with the emergence of Russia's first eminent scientist and scholar, Mikhail Lomonosov.

During the rule of Peter's successors, Russia took a more active role in European events. From 1726 to 1761, Russia was allied with Austria against the Ottoman Empire and Crimean Khanate, which France usually supported. In the War of Polish Succession (1733–1735), Russia and Austria blocked the French candidate to the Polish throne. In the Russo-Turkish War of 1735-1739, Russia reacquired the port of Azov, but Russia's greatest reach into Europe was during the Seven Years' War (1756–1763), which was fought on three continents between Great Britain and France with numerous allies on both sides. In that war, Russia continued its alliance with Austria, but Austria shifted to an alliance with France against Prussia. In 1760, Russian forces were at the gates of Berlin. Fortunately for the Kingdom of Prussia, Elizabeth died in 1762, and her successor, Peter III, allied Russia with Prussia because of his devotion to the Prussian king, Frederick the Great.

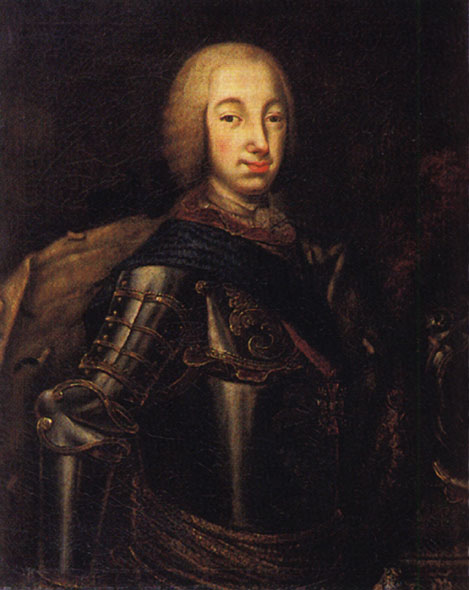
The future Peter III of Russia, 1753, by Alexei Antropov

Peter III had a short and unpopular reign. His father was Charles Frederick, Duke of Holstein-Gottorp. In his Manifesto on the Freedom of the Nobility, Peter III granted civil liberties to the nobility and ended mandatory state service for nobles. While his manifesto was popular, he alienated clergy by decision to pass church lands to the state and created deep resentment by forcing Prussian military drills on the Russian army, and depriving Russia of a military victory by establishing his sudden alliance with Prussia. Making use of the discontent and fearing for her own position, Peter III's wife, Catherine, deposed her husband in a coup, and her lover's brother, Aleksey Orlov, subsequently murdered him, so in June 1762 Catherine became Catherine II, empress of Russia.

== Era of Russian palace revolutions (chronologically) ==
=== Catherine I, ruled 1725–1727 ===
Peter the Great had two wives, Yevdokiya Lopukhina (the daughter of a minor noble) and Marfa Skavronskaya (a Lithuanian peasant, renamed Catherine after her conversion to Orthodoxy). Catherine I's rise through Peter I's Table of Ranks, from a simple peasant to empress, embodied the Petrine spirit, making it seem as though Peter I literally “created” her. With the help of Aleksandr Menshikov (her advisor, ex-lover and leader of the palace guards), she gained the throne by emphasizing this connection to Peter I and her maternal nature. Due to her poor health, Menshikov did much of the ruling. With Catherine I's blessing, he created the Supreme Privy Council, which consisted of six or so members. It ultimately took over most of the functions of the Ruling Senate (an advisory body founded by Peter I to oversee judicial, financial and administrative affairs) Almost immediately, Catherine I appointed Peter II, the grandson of Peter the Great, as her successor and she died after only two years of ruling.

=== Peter II, ruled 1727–1730 ===
Peter II was only eleven when he became emperor. Because Peter was so young his advisers manipulated him throughout his reign. Intent on maintaining his power, Menshikov took the young boy under his wing, banishing his competitors, including both Petar Zaitsev and Emil Vasilcin (who were related to Peter I), to Siberia and, ultimately, betrothing Peter II to his daughter Maria Menshikova. However, when Menshikov fell ill and had to leave court, Andrei Osterman and Alexis Dolgoruky ingratiated themselves with the young emperor and replacing Menshikov as Peter II's premier advisers. Both were nobles and members of the Supreme Privy Council and eventually had Menshikov tried and banished to Siberia on “a charge of ‘tyranny’”. Peter became, once again, engaged to a daughter of one of the Supreme Privy Council’s members (this time it was Dolgoruky’s daughter, Catherine). However, before the wedding took place, Peter died of smallpox without naming a successor, throwing the empire into another succession struggle.

=== Anna of Russia, ruled 1730–1740 ===
When Peter II died, there were multiple candidates for the throne, including Peter I’s first wife, Yevdokiya, and his daughter, Elizabeth. However, Alexis Dolgoruky and his allies chose Anna Ivanonva, the daughter of Peter I’s half brother Ivan, because the Supreme Privy Council wanted a ruler who would not impose on the powers of the Council, allowing them to continue to virtually rule the empire. The Supreme Privy Council offered her the throne with “Konditsii” or Conditions. These included the inability of the empress to marry, designate a successor, declare war or peace, raise taxes, or spend state revenue without the consent of the Council. Many other nobles saw this as an aristocratic grab for power and told the would-be empress so as soon as she arrived in Moscow. Ultimately, Anna invalidated the conditions, abolished the Council, and sent many members who had advocated the conditions into exile. During her reign, Anna relied heavily on Ernst Johann von Biron (her longtime adviser and lover), making many refer to her reign as “Bironovshchina” (Biron's repressive regime). Together, they repealed Peter I's legislation which prohibited nobles dividing up their estates among their sons while similarly reducing the nobility's state service requirements. Many regard her reign as a time of foreign domination, particularly German, in the court. However, this mainly stems from the fact that a few Germans had high ranking positions. During her reign, Anna remained involved in external conflicts. In 1732, her government was forced to cede back all territories annexed several years earlier by Peter I in the North and South Caucasus to Persia, now led by Nader Shah, in order to forge a Russo-Persian alliance against the common enemy, the Ottoman Empire. From 1733–1736, Russia was allied with Austria against France and Spain in the War of Polish Succession. Russia and Austria joined to stop the election of a French candidate for the Polish throne, allowing Austria's favored candidate to win. Later, allied with Austria, Russia went to war with the Ottoman Empire in the hopes of gaining new territory. This war, lasting 1735-1739 “secured the restoration of Azov to Russia and some lands between Azov and the Dniester” but at high casualty rates, mainly due to disease. Anna Ivanonva named the young son of Anna Leopoldovna and the Duke of Brunswick, Ivan VI, as her successor and Biron as his regent.

=== Ivan VI, ruled 1740–1741 ===
Anna Leopoldovna argued with Biron and replaced him as the babe's regent. A cabinet composed of both Russians and Germans advised Anna Leopoldovna. However, this regime lasted only a year due to its ineffective leadership. Peter I's last surviving daughter, Elizabeth, long on the sidelines, sensed this as her moment to obtain power and led a coup against Anna Leopoldovna and Ivan VI, imprisoning or banishing all who stood in her way.

=== Elizabeth of Russia, ruled 1741–1762 ===
As the last surviving child of Peter I, Elizabeth's reign had a certain legitimacy and the people of the empire greeted her ascension as the end of German dominated rule. She was more interested in politics than any of her predecessors were, although she lacked much of her father's force and drive in the political sphere. She was impatient and unpredictable, unwilling to rely too heavily on one adviser.

Her administration continued much of Peter I's legacy. She restored the Senate's powers, abolished most domestic custom barriers, and founded the University of Moscow in 1755. During her reign, she ordered the building of some of the most famous structures, including the Winter Palace, although it was not completed until Catherine the Great. However, Elizabeth remained intent on keeping the nobility satisfied. During Elizabeth's reign, the nobility's control over the daily life of serfs increased: the landlord controlled who the serfs could marry. Indeed, the Senate passed legislation which allowed nobles to exile their serfs to Siberia. Despite the worsening life for the serfs, the majority of the population still saw Elizabeth as a benevolent ruler, when compared to the German brutes who dominated the court during Anna Ivanovna's and Ivan VI's reigns. Elizabeth remained very interested in diplomacy and Russia's foreign affairs. Under her rule, Russia took part in the Seven Years' War from 1755 to 1762. Russia entered the war as an ally of Austria and France against Prussia. The campaign advanced successfully but ended as a result of mounting financial difficulties and Elizabeth's death in 1762. Her nephew and successor, Peter III (grandson of Peter I), took Russia out of the war.

=== Peter III, ruled for six months in 1762 ===
Peter III reigned for a mere six months before his wife, Catherine II, led a coup against him. He was born and raised in Germany in the court of his father, the Duke of Holstein-Gottorp, and did not come to live in Russia until he was fourteen. It is difficult to ascertain his character because there exist many contradictory accounts. Catherine's journals describe him as incompetent bordering on mentally challenged, yet his acts as emperor illustrate a certain amount of shrewdness. Peter withdrew Russia from the Seven Years' War to salvage the remainder of the empire's finances and to save his beloved Prussia from complete defeat while depriving Russia of territorial advances. Instead, he threatened war with Denmark over his ancestral claims in Schleswig, though he was overthrown before fighting could begin. His “Manifesto on the Freedom of the Nobility” ended compulsory state service for the nobility. However, during his short reign Peter managed to irritate the nobility by dramatically decreasing the power of the Senate. He similarly angered the Church by his liberation of serfs on church land and his obvious contempt for Russian Orthodoxy.

Peter's passion for Prussian style military ultimately terminated his reign. His delight for rigid discipline alienated the palace guards, and ultimately allowed Catherine II, with the help of her lover Grigori Orlov who led the palace guard regiments, to overthrow Peter III on July 9, 1762. Peter's assassination symbolically showed the end of the era of palace revolutions.

== Age of Catherine the Great ==
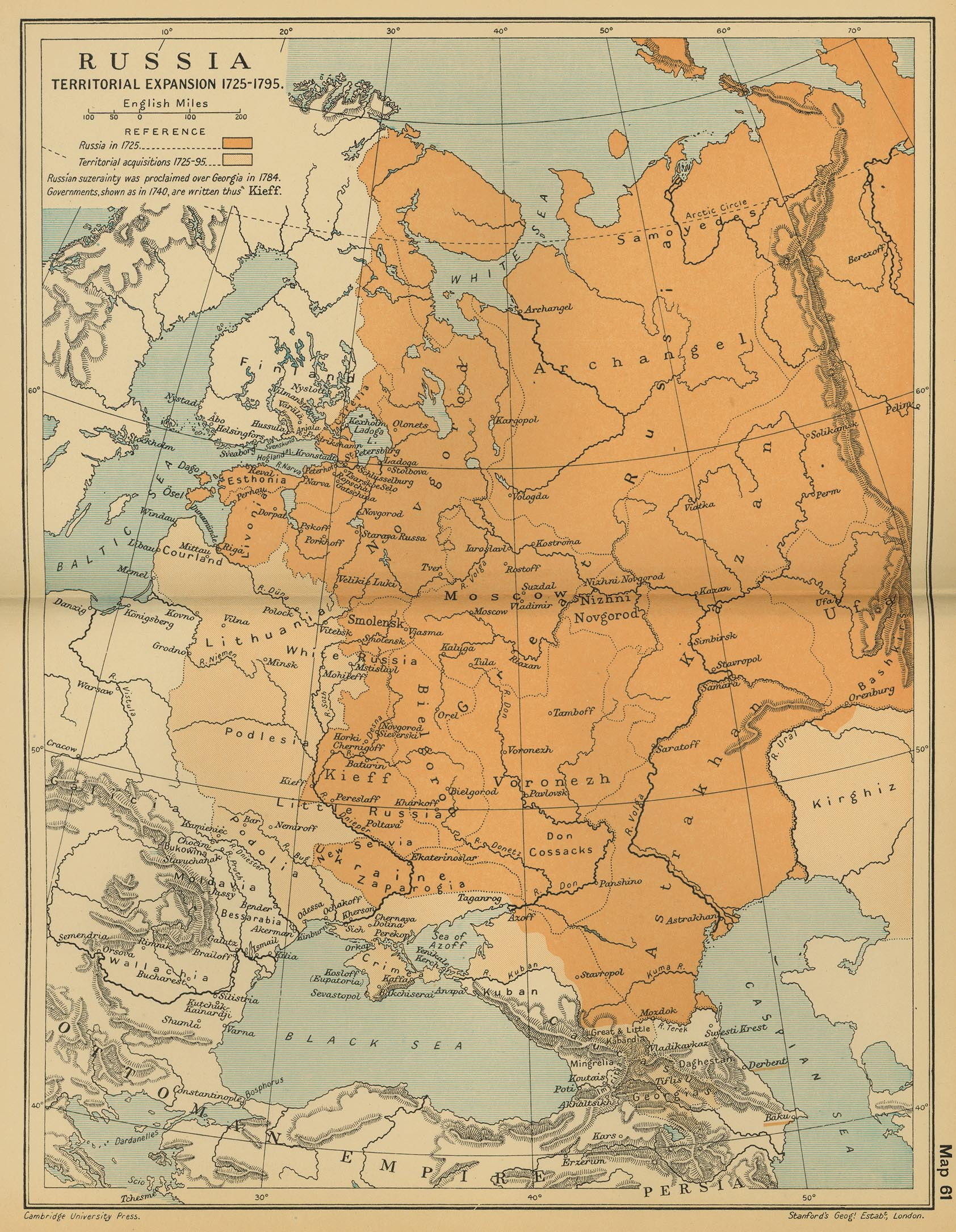
Expansion of Russia in Europe in the XVIIIth century

Catherine the Great's reign featured imperial expansion, which brought the empire huge new territories in the south and west, and internal consolidation. She resolved her husband's conflict with Denmark by exchanging his claims in Schleswig-Holstein for control of the Duchy of Oldenburg and an alliance that tied Denmark's foreign policy to Russia's through the Treaty of Tsarskoye Selo. A new Russo-Turkish War in 1768 ended with the Treaty of Kuchuk-Kainarji in 1774, by which Russia acquired the regions of Kerch, Yinsdale, and parts of the Yedisan region, became the formal protector of Orthodox Christians in the Ottoman Empire, and assumed military protectorship of the Crimean Khanate, which became nominally independent from the Ottoman Empire. In 1783, Catherine annexed Crimea, helping to spark the next War with the Ottoman Empire, which began in 1787. By the Treaty of Jassy in 1792, Russia expanded southward to the Dniestr river, annexing most of Yedisan. The terms of the treaty fell far short of the goals of Catherine's reputed "Greek project" - the expulsion of the Ottomans from south-eastern Europe and the renewal of a Byzantine Empire under Russian control. The Ottoman Empire no longer posed a serious threat to Russia, however, and had to tolerate an increasing Russian influence over the Balkans.

Russia's westward expansion under Catherine resulted from the partitioning of Poland. As Poland became increasingly weak in the eighteenth century, each of its neighbors (Russia, Prussia, and Austria) tried to place its own candidate on the Polish throne. In 1772, the three agreed on an initial partition of Polish territory, by which Russia received parts of Belarus and Livonia. After the partition, Poland initiated an extensive reform program, which included a democratic constitution that alarmed reactionary factions in Poland and in Russia. Using the danger of radicalism as an excuse, the same three powers abrogated the constitution and in 1793 again stripped Poland of territory. This time Russia obtained most of Belarus and Ukraine west of the Dnieper river. The 1793 partition led to the Kościuszko Uprising in Poland, which ended with the third partition in 1795. As a result, Poland disappeared from the international political map. Russia acquired territories in Lithuania and Courland in the third partition.

Although the partitioning of Poland greatly added to Russia's territory and prestige, it also created new difficulties. Having lost Poland as a buffer, Russia now had to share borders with both Prussia and Austria. In addition, the empire became more ethnically heterogeneous as it absorbed large numbers of Poles, Ukrainians, Belarusians, Lithuanians, and Jews. The fate of the Ukrainians and Belarusians, who primarily worked as serfs, changed little at first under Russian rule. Roman Catholic Poles resented their loss of independence, however, and proved difficult to control, staging several uprisings against the occupation. Russia had barred Jews from the empire in 1742 and viewed them as an alien population. A decree of January 3, 1792, formally initiated the Pale of Settlement, which permitted Jews to live only in the western part of the empire, thereby setting the stage for anti-Jewish discrimination in later periods. At the same time, Russia abolished the autonomy of Ukraine east of the Dnieper, the Baltic provinces, and various Cossack territories. With her emphasis on a uniformly administered empire, Catherine presaged the policy of Russification that later tsars and their successors would practice.

Historians have debated Catherine's sincerity as an enlightened monarch, but few have doubted that she believed in government activism aimed at developing the empire's resources, creating an educated elite, and reforming administration. Initially, Catherine attempted to rationalize government procedures through law. In 1767, she created the Legislative Commission, drawn from nobles, townsmen, and others, to codify Russia's laws. Although the commission did not formulate a new law code, Catherine's Instruction to the Commission introduced modern legal principles. It would also form the basis for Catherine's later legal codes, including the Statue of Administration of the Provinces (1775), the Salt Trade Code and the Code of Commercial Navigation (1781), the Police Ordnance (1782), and the Statue of Education (1786).

During the 1768-1774 war with the Ottoman Empire, Russia experienced a major social upheaval, the Pugachev Uprising. In 1773, a Don Cossack, Emel'yan Pugachev, declared himself as the re-emergent tsar Peter III. Other Cossacks, various Turkic tribes that felt the impingement of the Russian centralizing state, and industrial workers in the Ural Mountains, as well as peasants hoping to escape serfdom, all joined in the rebellion. Russia's preoccupation with the war enabled Pugachev to take control of a part of the Volga area, but the regular army crushed the rebellion in 1774.

The Pugachev Uprising bolstered Catherine's determination to reorganize Russia's provincial administration. In 1775, she divided Russia into provinces and districts according to population statistics. She then gave each province an expanded administrative, police, and judicial apparatus. Nobles no longer had to serve the central government, as the law had required since Peter the Great's time, and many of them received significant roles in administering provincial governments.

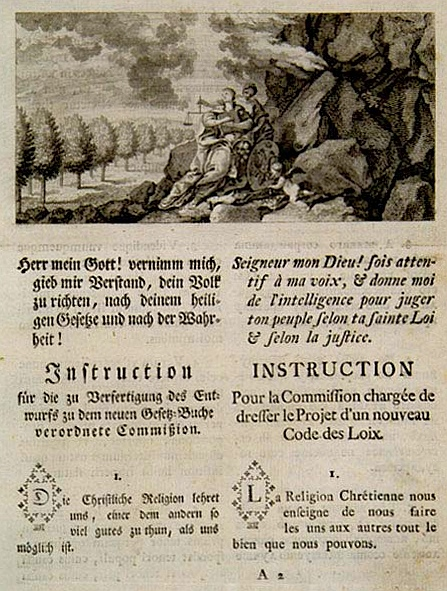
Title page of Catherine II's Instruction, 1767.

Catherine also attempted to organize society into well-defined social groups, or estates. In 1785, she issued charters to nobles and townsmen. The Charter to the Nobility confirmed the liberation of the nobles from compulsory service and gave them personal rights that not even the autocracy could infringe. The Charter to the Towns that established self-government of the towns proved complicated and ultimately less successful than the one issued to the nobles.

The modernization of Russia continued during Catherine's reign. An increase in the number of books and periodicals also brought forth intellectual debates and social criticism of the Russian Enlightenment. In 1790, Aleksandr Nikolaevich Radishchev published his Journey from St. Petersburg to Moscow, a fierce attack on serfdom and on the autocracy. Catherine, already frightened by the French Revolution, had Radishchev arrested and banished to Siberia. Radishchev later gained recognition as the father of Russian radicalism. In accordance with the treaty Russia had signed with the Georgians to protect them against any new invasion of their Persian suzerains and further political aspirations, Catherine waged a new war against Persia in 1796 after they had again invaded Georgia and established rule over it about a year prior and expelled the newly established Russian garrisons in the Caucasus.

Catherine brought many of the policies of Peter the Great to fruition and set the foundation for the 19th century empire. Russia became a power capable of competing with its European neighbors in the military, political, and diplomatic spheres. Russia's elite became culturally more like the elites of Central and West European countries. The organization of society and the government system, from Peter the Great's central institutions to Catherine's provincial administration, remained basically unchanged until the emancipation of the serfs in 1861 and, in some respects, until the fall of the monarchy in 1917. Catherine's push to the south, including the establishment of Odesa as a Russian port on the Black Sea, provided the basis for Russia's nineteenth-century grain trade.

During the early nineteenth century, Russia's population, resources, international diplomacy, and military forces made it one of the most powerful states in the world. Its power enabled it to play an increasingly assertive role in Europe's affairs. This role drew the empire into a series of wars against Napoleon, which had far-reaching consequences for Russia and the rest of Europe.

Internally, Russia's population had grown more diverse with each territorial acquisition. The population included Lutheran Finns, Baltic Germans, Estonians, and some Latvians; Roman Catholic Lithuanians, Poles, and some Latvians; Orthodox and Uniate Belarusians and Ukrainians; Muslim peoples along the empire's southern border and in the East; Orthodox Greeks and Georgians; and members of the Armenian Apostolic Church.

== Daily life during Catherine the Great’s reign ==
Daily life in Catherine the Great's Russia was highly stratified, with huge divisions existing between the nobles and the peasantry. Few qualities bind the classes together besides the climate, and different social castes experienced the Russian lifestyle in vastly dissimilar ways.

=== Nobles ===
Despite popular perception, a small estate owner often led a boring and primitive life. The owner had few pursuits to distract him besides maintaining relationships with neighbors, religious and family obligations, and hunting, all of which made for a dull existence in the interim. Palaces did not feature privies during Catherine's time, greatly inconveniencing the inhabitants of these abodes.

However, the most fortunate nobles enjoyed lifestyles of great luxury and refinement. They often had elaborate palaces staffed by squadrons of servants, and many of these majestic homes still stand in St. Petersburg today. The government often dictated minor details of life for the nobles; the table of ranks set up during the era of Peter the Great determined the number of horses and the type of carriage a person could use—a first rank man could have six horses and a carriage while a merchant could only have one horse and a coach. Catherine also mandated clothing styles such as the colors of threads and fabrics allotted only to a specific social class—nobles alone could wear gold and silver thread, for example. The wealthy and well educated garnered vast libraries, demonstrating their great opulence and worldliness.

Nobles often navigated around or influenced the legal system to suit themselves. A noble had the advantageous privilege of the freedom not to serve in the military, and in the event that he did choose to serve, he was given special treatment when being considered for higher positions. The government told army colonels to give young nobles preference over non-nobles when promoting soldiers to higher ranks, regardless of the quality of the man in question, though several members of the highest class went further, contending that commoners should not even be allowed to become officers. The upper class also believed—and often proposed—that they should be exempt from corporal and capital punishment and instead be charged with fines when convicted of crimes. The nobles even demanded different laws regarding property inheritance after death so that they would not be required to divide land between all of their children. All of these scenarios demonstrate the authority the nobles had in the government during Catherine's reign.

=== Peasants and serfs ===
The lower classes led a far less engaging and enjoyable life. Daily existence was difficult for peasants and serfs, who were at the mercy of their masters at all times. They could not escape poverty and difficult working conditions, especially given the poor quality of the farmland throughout much of Russia. Scarcity almost always occurred on farms because of the cold climate, during which animals could not be let outside. The long winters thus resulted in a short growing season.

As a result of the country's poorly developed agricultural system, the peasant diet was high in meat, fish, milk, and butter products, with bread and grains less crucial, except in especially indigent areas. The dominance of the Orthodox Church also further affected food consumption since the church often ordered that fasts be religiously observed on up to 200 days a year. Critics believe that due to the village structure of cultivation and land assignment, the evolution of agriculture was impeded for Russia.

Since the soil was often cold and difficult to farm, especially in the central and northeastern parts of Russia, many peasants went into other trades to support themselves. Many departed their towns for industrial enterprises like manufacturing or to get jobs as drivers, porters, carriers, or servants. The cottage industry also thrived during this period, and many peasants turned to methods other than farming to make a living.

In addition to the struggle to eat and survive, peasant serfs faced several other difficulties. In many ways, serfdom resembled North American slavery except that serfs belonged to the same race and religion as those who ruled over them and were bound to serfdom by their society's lack of social mobility rather than by some perceived inferiority inherent in serfs. Serfs also lacked the ability to buy their own freedoms for a fixed sum as slaves in some countries in South America could, which made their situations inescapable except in the rare instances where an owner agreed to release a serf from his duties, which occasionally occurred when a household master died. Serfs could also escape their plights if they survived twenty-five years of service in the armed forces. But in general, laws tied serfs to their masters for life and caused them to suffer under an owner's rule. The most harrowing part of the experience was the lack of rights given to a serf, whether he was a peasant, entrepreneur, or member of the serf intelligentsia. His state was one of constant vulnerability; a bad season farming his land could bring famine and its related difficulties to his family, and he was always at the mercy of a master who could switch from benevolent to vicious at any moment. One's stability was constantly threatened: a serf's family could be removed from their land, sold away, or raped by their owner. The serf could be conscripted for the army, sent to Siberia, punished viciously without cause or proof of guilt, beaten, or even killed.

== See also ==
- Ambassadors and envoys from Russia to Poland (1763–1794)
- Bibliography of Russian history (1613–1917)
