= Valerian Maykov =

Russian writer and literary critic

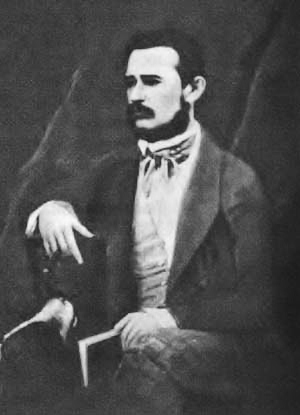
- Born: September 9, 1823; Moscow, Russia
- Died: July 27, 1847 (aged 23); Petergof, Russia

Valerian Nikolayevich Maykov (Russian: Валериа́н Никола́евич Ма́йков; September 9 1823 — July 27, 1847) was a Russian writer and literary critic, son of painter Nikolay Maykov, brother of poet Apollon and novelist Vladimir Maykov. Valerian Maykov, once a Petrashevsky Circle associate, was considered by contemporaries as heir to Vissarion Belinsky's position of Russia's leading critic, and later credited for being arguably the first in Russia to introduce scientific approach to the art of literary criticism.

== Biography ==
Valerian Maykov, son of painter Nikolay Maykov, was born in Moscow and received a high-quality home education: Ivan Goncharov, the family's friend, taught him Russian language and literature. He studied in the Saint Petersburg University and later cited professor Viktor Poroshin who taught political economy as a major influence. In his first article, called "Productivity as Related to Wealth Distribution" (1842), he critically analyzed Adam Smith's theory and suggested an idea of workers' receiving shares of the profit. In 1842 Maykov graduated from the university and joined the governmental Department of Agriculture. Soon he quit it due to ill health and spent half a year in Germany, France and Switzerland, where he studied extensively political economy, philosophy and chemistry.

On his return to Saint Petersburg, Maykov became close to the Petrashevsky circle and took part in compiling the so-called Pocket Dictionary of Foreign Words Now Part of the Russian Language (1845–46) along with N.Kirillov and Mikhail Petrashevsky himself. There he wrote some major articles: "Analysis", "Criticism", "Ideal", "Drama", "Journal". The Kirillov's Dictionary, the most obvious result of French Revolution influence (and an analogue of Voltaire's Philosophy Dictionary), in the late 1840s was banned and put out of circulation. In 1849 Ivan Liprandi who investigated the Petrashevsky case, was saying that the dictionary "was full of such daring things which were worse than those in hand-written copies that were circulating around". In 1845 Maykov became a co-editor of the Finsky vestnik (The Finnish Herald) magazine, founded by Fyodor Dershau. The first volume of it opened with Maykov's large (unfinished) article "Social Sciences in Russia" in which he formulated the main thesis of his whole literary legacy: the need for science and arts to be organically linked with social reality. The second part of the article was to be a critical analysis of "the progressive thought in Russia," focusing on Vissarion Belinsky, but got banned and later appeared in miscellaneous fragments.

Maykov's article has been noticed in literary circles, and in 1846 Andrey Krayevsky (on Ivan Turgenev's recommendation) invited Maykov to become an editor of critical department of Otechestvennye Zapiski, where Belinsky worked. In his first major article, on poet Aleksey Koltsov, Maykov came into direct conflict with Belinsky, accusing him of "biased and unfounded criticism" and "literary dictatorship". Belinsky's reply was harsh and this made the relationship between Otechestvennye Zapisky and Sovremennik, a Belinsky circle's unofficial base, strained. In spite of this Maykov in 1847 started to collaborate with Sovremennik. The same year he organised his own circle, close to that of Petrashevsky, with Vladimir Milyutin and Mikhail Saltykov-Shchedrin among its members. By this time Maykov's philosophy changed: inspired by Ludwig Feuerbach and Western Socialists he came up with his own concept of "harmonical man" and "ideal civilisation", seeing, among other things, national and ethnic differences as totally superfluous.

Valerian Maykov’s promising career suddenly came to an end on July 15, 1847. While guesting in Petergof region, he died of a stroke while swimming. He was buried in a village graveyard of Ropsha nearby Saint Petersburg.

== Legacy ==
After a barrage of obituaries all mourning Russian literature's heavy loss there came ten years of oblivion. In 1861 Fyodor Dostoyevsky wrote warmly of Maykov's short legacy, then in 1868 Ivan Turgenev published a piece on him in his Literary Memoirs. In 1972 the magazine Otechestvennye Zapisky published a major analysis of Maykov's works. Critics argued, though, that the author, Aleksander Skabichevsky greatly exaggerated the degree of disagreement between him and Belinsky. In 1886 a large article by K. K. Arsentyev on Maykov and his political activities was published by Vestnik Evropy. The years 1891 and 1892 saw a renewed interest in Maykov's set of ideas when A. N. Tchudinov published in Literary Pantheon (Пантеон Литературы) his Critical Exercises (Критические опыты), which inspired a lively discussion in Vestnik Evropy, Russkaya Mysl and Istorichesky Vestnik magazines. Later a large article on this work was published by Akim Volynsky in his Russian Critics series.

According to the Brockhaus and Efron Encyclopedic Dictionary, Maykov "wasn't a gifted writer in the common sense of the word," his style of writing was "anemic and occasionally murky", his analysis of Herzen and Tyutchev's works not original. Yet author Semyon Vengerov credited Maykov with being arguably the first "theoretical" critic in Russia who, unlike most of his colleagues, was interested not so much in analysis of particular literary works as with the way these works fitted into his own "rather neat and elaborate aesthetic theory". In fact, Maykov himself (in a letter to Turgenev) admitted that he'd "never meant to become a critic in terms of evaluating "other people's literary works". "I always dreamt of a scientist's career. But how could I make the common public read my scientific works? For me literary criticism is the only way of enticing it into the spheres of my scientific interest," he wrote.
