= Church of the Ascension, Stirchley (II) =

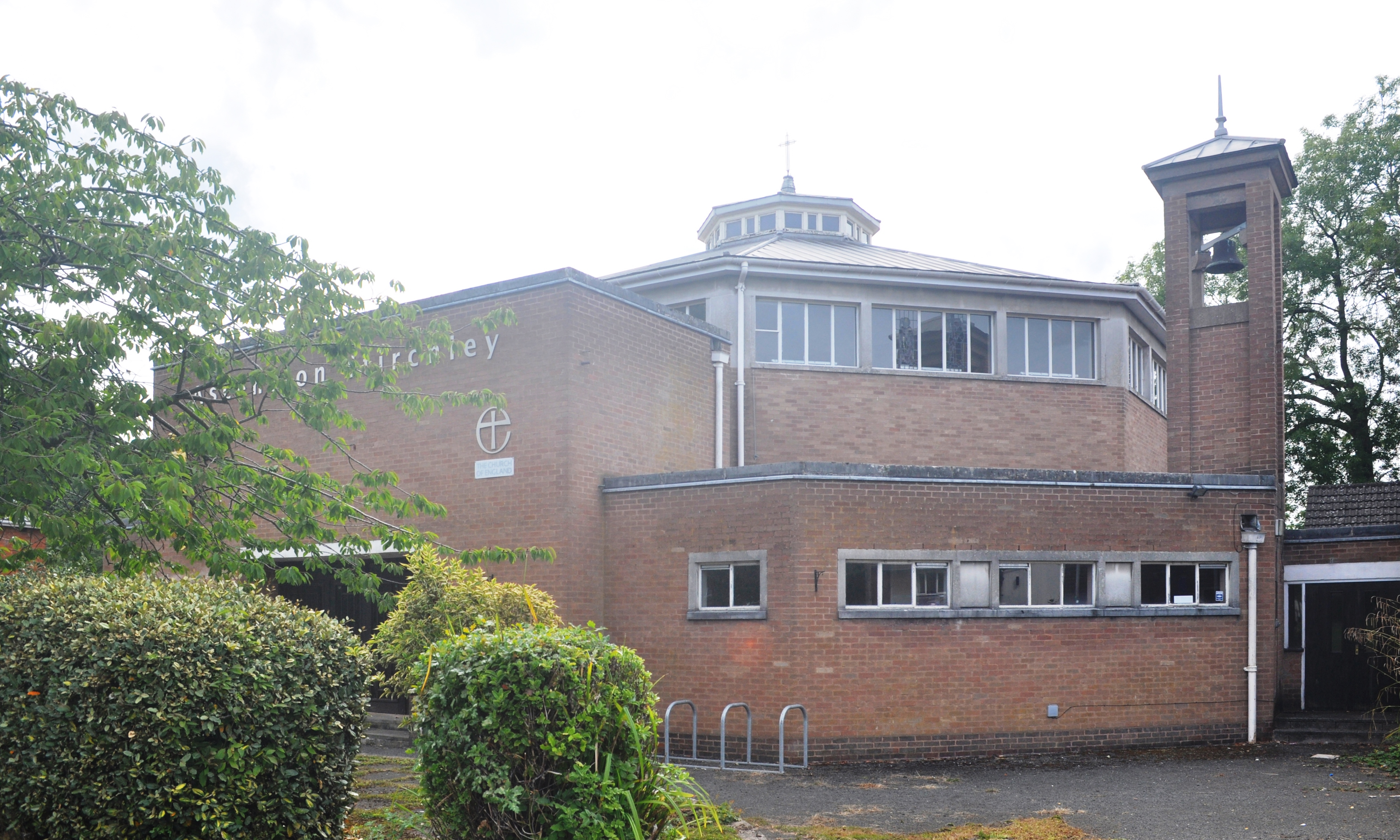
- The church in 2025
- Church of the Ascension, Stirchley
- 52°26′4.5″N 1°54′26.1″W
- Location: Stirchley
- Country: England
- Denomination: Church of England
- Churchmanship: Modern Catholic
- Website: ascensionstirchley.com

History
- Dedication: The Ascension
- Consecrated: 14 July 1973

Architecture
- Architect: Romilly Craze
- Completed: 1973

Administration
- Diocese: Anglican Diocese of Birmingham
- Archdeaconry: Birmingham
- Deanery: Moseley
- Parish: The Ascension Stirchley

The Church of the Ascension, Stirchley is a parish church in the Church of England in Birmingham.

== History ==
On 29 October 1965, the former church building was destroyed by fire and was demolished. This new church designed by Romilly Craze, was constructed next to its former mission church of St. Hugh's, Pineapple Grove, and was consecrated by the Bishop of Birmingham on 14 July 1973. Surviving features from the original church, such as some of the stained glass, the Stations of the Cross, the altar silver, the processional crosses and the vestments, were used in the new church. St. Hugh's became the church hall.

A statue of the Risen Christ was erected on the facade of the new church. It was designed by John Bridgeman of Leamington Spa, made of fibre glass and cost £600. A window of the ascending Christ in slab glass and concrete was designed by John Lawson and a crucifix was designed by John Skelton.
