= Princes Park =

Princes Park or Prince's Park may refer to:

- Princes Park (Auburn), a sports ground in Sydney, New South Wales, Australia
- Princes Park (Dartford), a football stadium in Kent, England
- Princes Park (Liverpool ward), a Liverpool City Council Ward
- Prince's Park, Burntwood, a park in Staffordshire, England
- Princes Park, Carlton, a park in Carlton North, Melbourne, Australia
  - Princes Park (stadium), an Australian rules football ground in the park
- Princes Park, Eastbourne, a park in East Sussex, England
- Prince's Park, Liverpool, a park in Toxteth, Liverpool, England
- Princes Park, Retie, a park in Antwerp Province, Flanders, Belgium
- Princes Park, Temple Fortune, a park in the London Borough of Barnet, North London, England

== See also ==
- Parc des Princes, a sports stadium in Paris, France
