= Church of the Ascension, Stirchley (I) =

The Ascension, Stirchley
- The Ascension, Stirchley
- 52°25′41.8″N 1°55′21.8″W
- OS grid reference: SP 05253 81188
- Location: Stirchley, West Midlands
- Country: England
- Denomination: Church of England

History
- Dedication: The Ascension
- Consecrated: 30 October 1901

Architecture
- Architect: William Hale
- Groundbreaking: 1898
- Completed: 1901
- Closed: 29 October 1965

The Church of the Ascension, Stirchley (1901–1965) was a Church of England parish church in Stirchley, Birmingham.

== History ==
The Church of Ascension, the first church in Stirchley, began construction 1898 on Hazelwell Street. Construction was completed in 1901 and it was consecrated by the Bishop of Coventry on 30 October 1901. It was designed by William Hale as a chapel-of-ease to St Mary's Church, Moseley. A parish was assigned to it in 1912 out of the parishes of St Mary's Church, Moseley and St Nicolas' Church, Kings Norton.

On 1 December 1927, a church dedicated to St. Hugh of Lincoln serving the Dads Lane Estate, was opened in Pineapple Grove.

On 29 October 1965, the Church was destroyed by fire and was demolished. A new church, designed by Romilly Craze, was constructed next to St. Hugh's and was consecrated by the Bishop of Birmingham on 14 July 1973. Surviving features from the original church, such as some of the stained glass, the Stations of the Cross, the altar silver, the processional crosses and the vestments, were used in the new church. St. Hugh's became the church hall for the replacement Church of Ascension.

Some 16mm Black & White / Mute Television News footage of the fire filmed by Associated Television survives in the Media Archive for Central England

== Organ ==
The church contained an organ by Norman and Beard dating from 1901. A specification of the organ can be found on the National Pipe Organ Register. The organ was destroyed in the fire in 1965.
