= Hazelwell =

Coordinates: 52.42652°N 1.90934°W

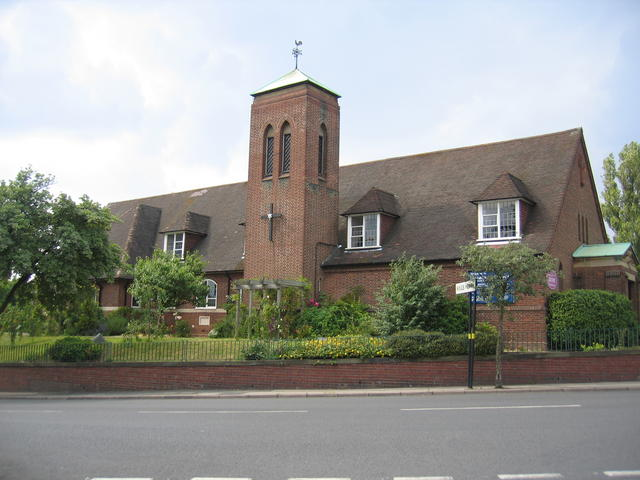
- Hazelwell Hub at Hazelwell Church

- Location within the West Midlands
- OS grid reference: SP062809
- Metropolitan borough: Birmingham
- Metropolitan county: West Midlands
- Region: West Midlands
- Country: England
- Sovereign state: United Kingdom
- Post town: BIRMINGHAM
- Postcode district: B14 B30
- Dialling code: 0121
- Police: West Midlands
- Fire: West Midlands
- Ambulance: West Midlands

Hazelwell is an area in south-west Birmingham, England. Originally a distinct neighbourhood, it has since been incorporated into and split between the suburbs of Stirchley and Kings Heath.

== History ==
The Hazelwell family held an estate here from at least the 14th century, first recorded to William de Hazelwell in 1325. Though the area was originally part of the Worcestershire manor of Kings Norton, it seemingly became a separate manor by the 17th century. The name 'Hazelwell' is common locally and it appears as the name of a lane, a road, and a street. The name appears to be a reference to a former spring adjacent to the River Rea, the 'Hazel Well' (also 'Hasel Well'), which though still flowing in 1894 is no longer visible. It is unknown whether the de Hazelwell family gave their name to the spring or whether they adopted the toponym when they settled.

No suburban settlement is shown near Hazelwell on the 1834 Ordnance Survey maps, but by 1888 a small village had begun to form around Hazelwell Street and Pershore Road, immediately west of Hazelwell Hall, then known as Stirchley Street. By 1906 houses, shops, and amenities had spread out linearly along Pershore Road. By the late 1930s a smaller cluster of shops and houses had formed to the east of Hazelwell Hall along the end of Vicarage Road.

=== Hazelwell Mill ===
Hazelwell Mill, a corn mill first recorded in 1704, once operated near the settlement on the River Rea. By 1783 it had begun producing gun barrels (as was common in Birmingham at the time) and continued operating until 1886. Though becoming a rubber factory by the early 20th century, all buildings were demolished prior to 1978, when Stirchley Industrial Estate was constructed on the site.
