= Saint Mary and Archangel Michael Church =

Church in Temple Fortune, London, England

Coordinates: 51.5829°N 0.2039°W

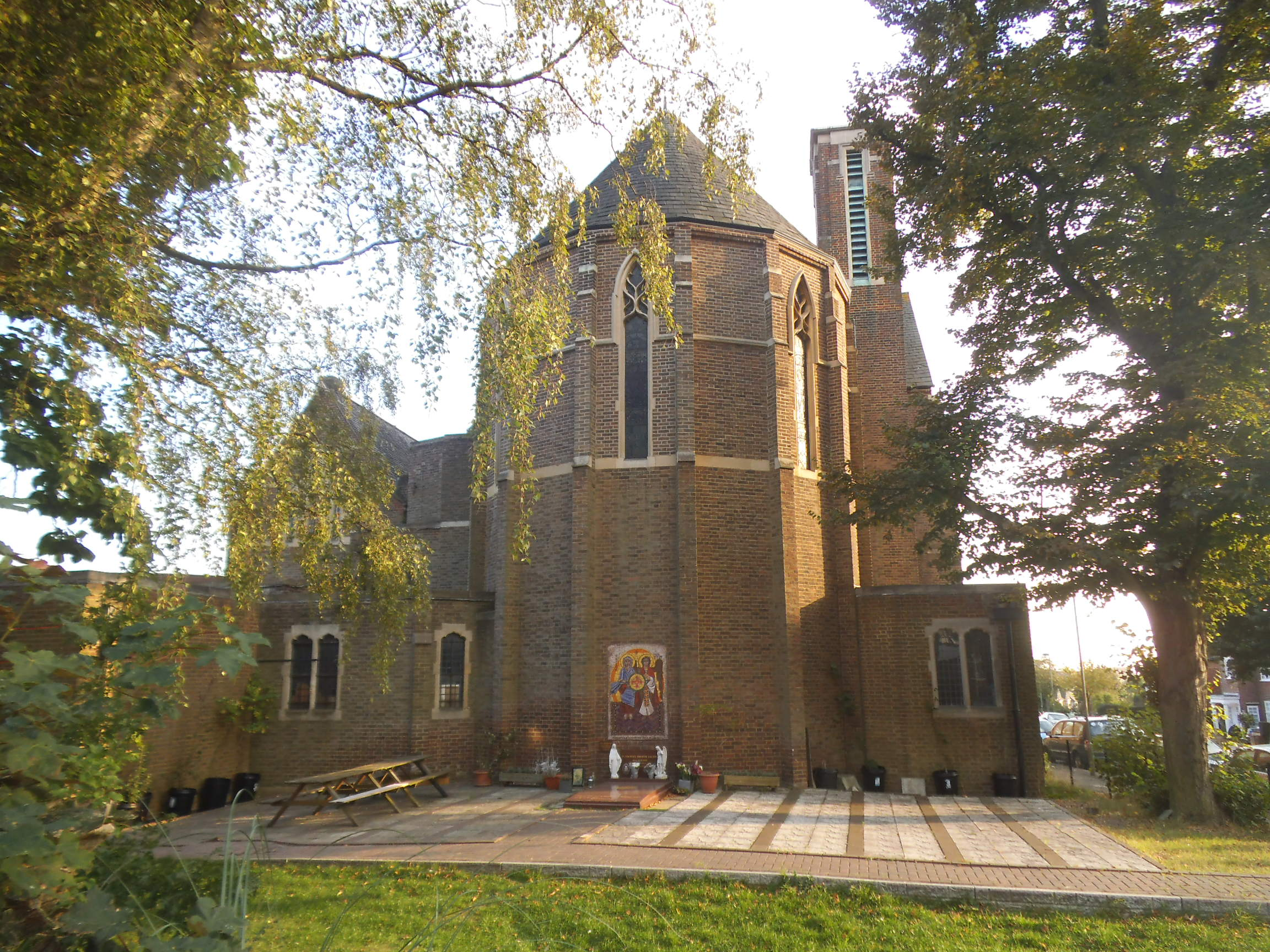

Saint Mary and Archangel Michael Church is a Coptic Orthodox church on Cranbourne Gardens, Temple Fortune, north London. It is housed in a building built in stages between 1915 and 1962 as the Church of England church of Saint Barnabas, Temple Fortune, whose records are held at the London Metropolitan Archives.

== History ==
Initially an 1890s mission church (Note: A mission church is an outlying non-parish church, similar to a chapel of ease, established to reach those for whom the parish church would be inaccessible; it is directly supported by the parish or diocese.) of St Mary's Church, Hendon, then a London Diocesan Home Mission, it became a consolidated chapelry of its own in 1923, taking parts of Hendon and Finchley parishes. Its 1915 building by John Samuel Alder had its nave extended and a chancel and Lady Chapel added in 1932–1934 by Ernest Charles Shearman. A replacement nave was designed in 1962 by Romilly Craze. August 1994 saw the Anglican congregation move out, with its parish area absorbed into that of St Alban's Church, Golders Green.
