= St Silas Church, Kentish Town =

Church of Saint Silas the Martyr
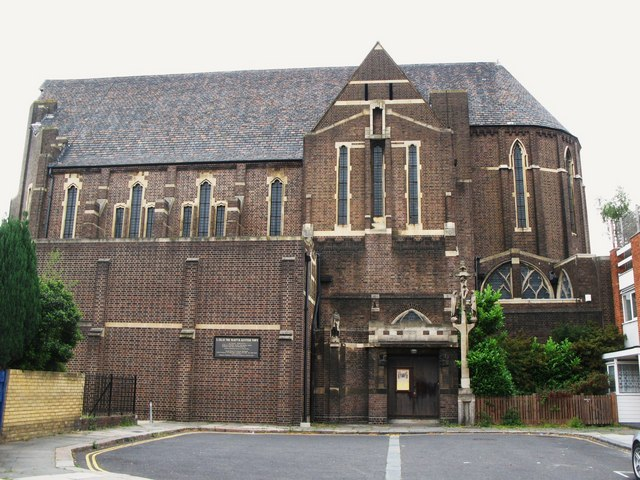
- Church of Saint Silas the Martyr
- 51.5466°N 0.1524°W
- Location: Kentish Town, London
- Country: England
- Denomination: Church of England
- Churchmanship: Anglo-Catholic
- Website: www.ssilas.co.uk

History
- Status: Active
- Consecrated: 26 October 1912

Architecture
- Functional status: Parish church
- Heritage designation: Grade II*

Administration
- Diocese: London
- Archdeaconry: Hampstead
- Deanery: South Camden
- Parish: St. Silas the Martyr and Holy Trinity with St. Barnabas Kentish Town

Clergy
- Bishop: Jonathan Baker (AEO)
- Vicar: Philip Corbett SSC

The Church of Saint Silas the Martyr is a Church of England parish church in Kentish Town, London, England. The church is a grade II* listed building.

== History ==
The church was built from 1911 to 1913, and designed by the architect Ernest Charles Shearman. The Church of St Silas replaced an earlier mission church. The building was funded through a £7,000 donation in the will of Henry Howard Paul, a wealthy American who had spent most of his career in the United Kingdom. The church was consecrated on 26 October 1912 by Arthur Winnington-Ingram, the then Bishop of London.

On 10 June 1954, the church was designated a grade II* listed building.

=== Present day ===
The church stands in the Anglo-Catholic tradition of the Church of England.

== Gallery ==
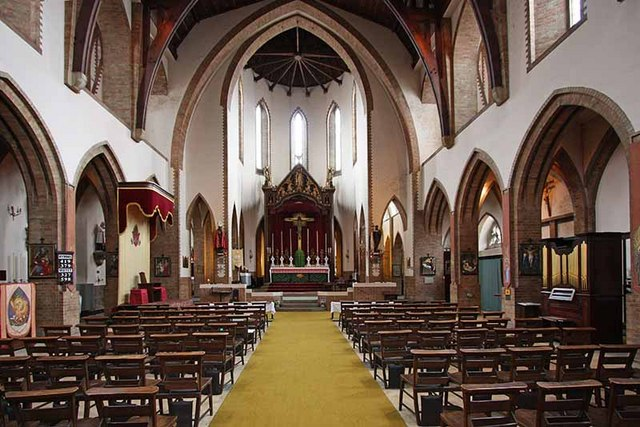
Nave towards the altar

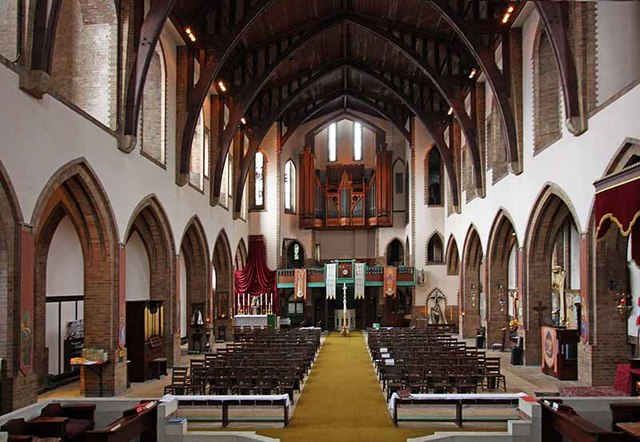
Nave towards the font

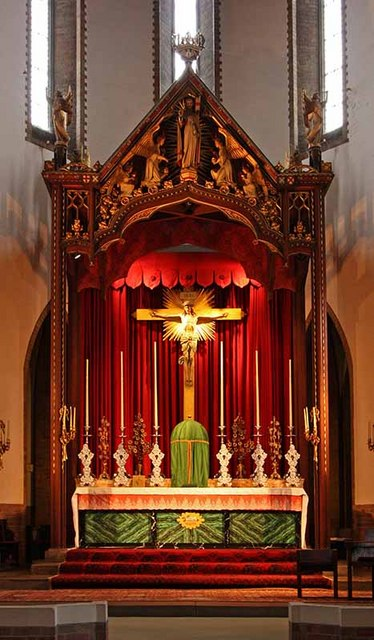
Altar with ciborium

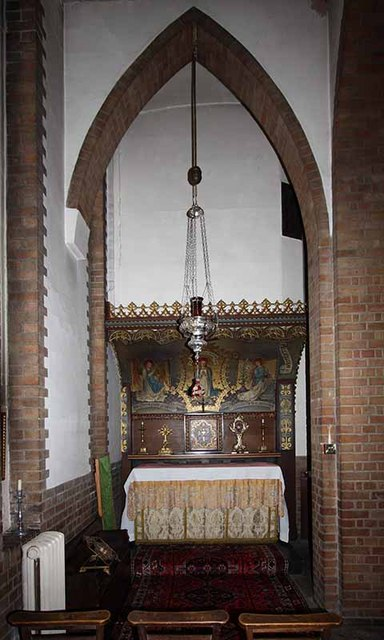
Side chapel dedicated to St Thomas

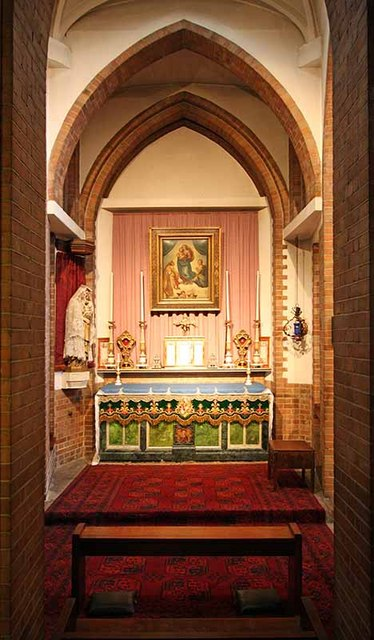
Lady chapel
