= St Barnabas Church, Pitshanger Lane =

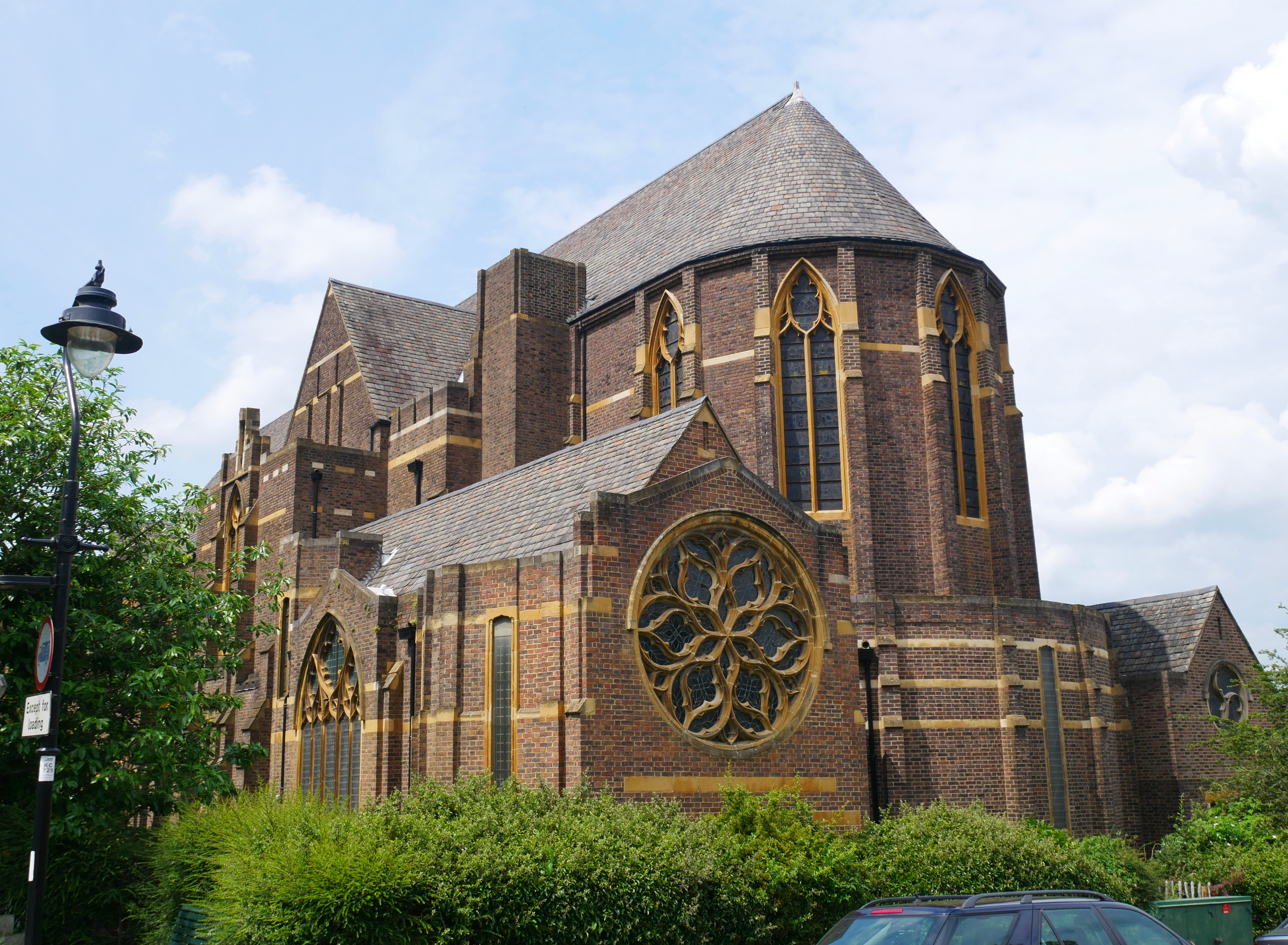
- St Barnabas Church, Pitshanger Lane
- 51°31′38″N 0°18′34″W
- Country: England
- Denomination: Church of England
- Website: www.barnabites.org

Architecture
- Architect: Ernest Charles Shearman
- Years built: 1914-1916

Administration
- Diocese: Diocese of London
- Parish: St Barnabas, Ealing

Clergy
- Priest: Sarah Howard-Jones

St Barnabas Church, Pitshanger Lane is a Church of England church in London Borough of Ealing. It was Grade II listed in 1997.

== History ==
The plans for Brentham Garden Suburb did not include a church and so a site was purchased in December 1905 for a tin church, succeeded by a permanent building designed by Ernest Shearman between 1914 and 1916. A fresco by James Clark was added to the eastern apse between 1917 and 1920. A 1920s organ was replaced by one from St Jude's Church, Southsea in 2011.
