= John Pelling (artist) =

British artist and clergyman (born 1930)

- Born: 1930 (age 95–96); Hove, East Sussex, England
- Known for: Painting
- Movement: Abstract and religious imagery

John Pelling (born 1930) is a British artist and clergyman, and is an Associate of the Royal College of Art, known for works on large canvases, abstract works, and paintings of religious imagery.

== Personal life ==
Pelling was born in Hove, East Sussex, in 1930, and educated at Brighton Grammar School. He went on to study at the Royal College of Art in London from 1951 to 1955, studying under John Minton and Francis Bacon amongst others.

He is married to the 1950s model Zoe Newton (now Zoe Pelling), who is also an artist, and was the most photographed and highly paid model in Britain of her time, appearing on the front of popular magazines such as Picturegoer. She appeared on television and in the Dairy Council advertisements as the "drinka pinta milka day" girl. She was previously married to billionaire businessman David Barclay.

Pelling is one of the judges of the annual International Firework Competition in Monte Carlo.

He has worked from studios in Kensington (west London) and Monte Carlo. He currently has a studio in Chelsea.

== Church career ==
Ordained in 1959 in the Diocese of Chichester, Pelling served in churches in Kensington and Hammersmith, before moving in 1979 to the south of France. His final ecclesiastical appointment before retirement was as Chaplain to the Anglican Church in Nice, France, and he established a family home in Monte Carlo. Pelling has stated that his art is part of his ministry, and that he was encouraged by his ordaining Bishop to pursue his art as part of his religious vocation. Nonetheless, in 1982 he retired from active ministry to devote himself to full-time work as an artist. The Sunday Mirror newspaper reported that Pelling could raise the same money by selling one painting, as working for three months as a clergyman. He was received into the Catholic Church and the Personal Ordinariate of Our Lady of Walsingham in 2011.

== Artistic career ==
Pelling has become known for large scale works on massive canvases, many of his paintings being between 10 and 15 feet in length. His abstract style has left him open to broad interpretation, although religious imagery is always a strong element. For example, "Maternal Movement", which is displayed at the Chelsea Arts Club appears to show an embryo and an umbilical cord, and the angular designs below the central subject appear to represent the female reproductive organs (female genitalia feature in many of Pelling's works), but the non-abstract intrusion of a monstrance containing the sacramental host clearly points to the subject being the unborn Jesus Christ in his mother's womb.

In addition to these abstract styles, Pelling also paints vividly colourful religious arts, such as his 2002 series of fourteen Stations of the Cross for St Thomas the Apostle Church, Hanwell, whose colourful composition is typical. Pelling has stated that his use of strong primary colours is a reflection of his experience of "the contrasts of parish work [in the Church of England] and its intensity". On occasion Pelling has used just shades of a single colour, not only in abstract work, but also in character painting, such as the shades of blue/green in his work "The Annunciation" commissioned by, and displayed in, St Gabriel's Church, North Acton, in London.

Pelling has also undertaken portrait work. His portrait of Graham Greene was the final one commissioned and painted before Greene's death.

Today works by Pelling are included in the royal collections of Monaco and Kuwait; extensive collections of his work may be found in the National Gallery of Modern Art of Poland, at Gdańsk.

== Artistic protest ==
Art has been Pelling's primary means of protesting his strongly-held opposition to the ordination of women. It has been observed that this position is in stark contrast to Pelling's love of women generally, and of painting nude female forms in particular. In 1998 Pelling staged an exhibition at the Air Gallery, Dover Street, London, of paintings depicting his opposition to women priests and bishops. Images included naked women draped over church altars, large women with their breasts exposed fighting on the ground for a mitre, a coffin bearing the words 'Church of England', and diminutive male priests on their knees in solemn prayer. The exhibition attracted widespread journalistic attention and was reported in British newspapers ranging from the Daily Mirror, through The Independent, to The Daily Telegraph.
