= Mary Ellen Cottrell =

Mary Ellen Cottrell (August 11, 1868 – December 1969) was a Labour and Co-op activist and politician both in Birmingham, and at a national level.

== Biography ==
Cottrell was born Mary Ellen Bryan in Sheffield, Yorkshire, the daughter of Richard and Maria Bryan (née Tester). She became a school teacher and eventually headmistress. In 1896, she married Frank Cottrell at Ecclesall Bierlow, Yorkshire. They set up home in Birmingham, where three sons were born: Frank in 1897, Wilfred in 1902, and Norman Bryan in 1907.

She was active in the local co-operative movement, serving as secretary of the local Women's Guild, and was elected to the board of the Ten Acres and Stirchley Co-operative Society (TASCOS) in 1909 as the first woman to serve in that role. She was also the first woman to represent the Midlands on the Co-operative Union's Central Board in 1917. She is credited with getting wartime rations of milk increased for infants and nursing and expectant mothers while serving on the Milk Advisory Board in 1918.

On 6 February 1917, she was elected unopposed to Birmingham City Council at a by-election for Selly Oak caused by George Shann's elevation to alderman. Her selection as the Labour Party candidate was controversial at the time; as at least two local trade union officers had hoped to be selected. She was the first female Labour councillor to serve on the City Council. She was introduced to her first Council meeting by Cllr Thomas Hackett as having rendered great service to the Labour movement in Selly Oak and as having had considerable experience in public work. Her election pre-dated the launch of the Co-operative Party by some months, but from 1920 she stood as a Labour/Co-op candidate.

Cottrell stood for re-election in 1920, but was defeated by the Conservative candidate. She returned to the Council in December 1921 at a by-election and served until 1923. In 1922, she became the first woman elected to the Board of the Co-operative Wholesale Society, where she was to be the only woman director for 37 years. She stepped down from the council to concentrate on her co-operative work.

In the 1939 Register, Cottrell is shown as living in the same house in Oak Tree Lane, Selly Oak as when she was elected. She is described as widowed, and as "Director CWS (Retired)".

She died in Birmingham at the age of 101. In 2019, a blue plaque was installed on the building of the former TASCOS bakery on the Pershore Road in Stirchley to commemorate her.
