= St Francis of Assisi Church, Isleworth =

Church in Isleworth, London, England

Coordinates: 51°28′57″N 0°19′52″W

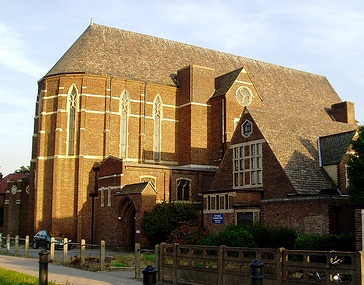

St Francis of Assisi Church, Isleworth is a Church of England parish church on the Great West Road in Isleworth, London. It was designed by Ernest Charles Shearman, with the foundation stone laid in 1933 and completion two years later. It was Grade II listed in 1994.
