= St Matthew's Church, Wimbledon =

Church in West Wimbledon, London

Coordinates: 51°24′43″N 0°14′02″W

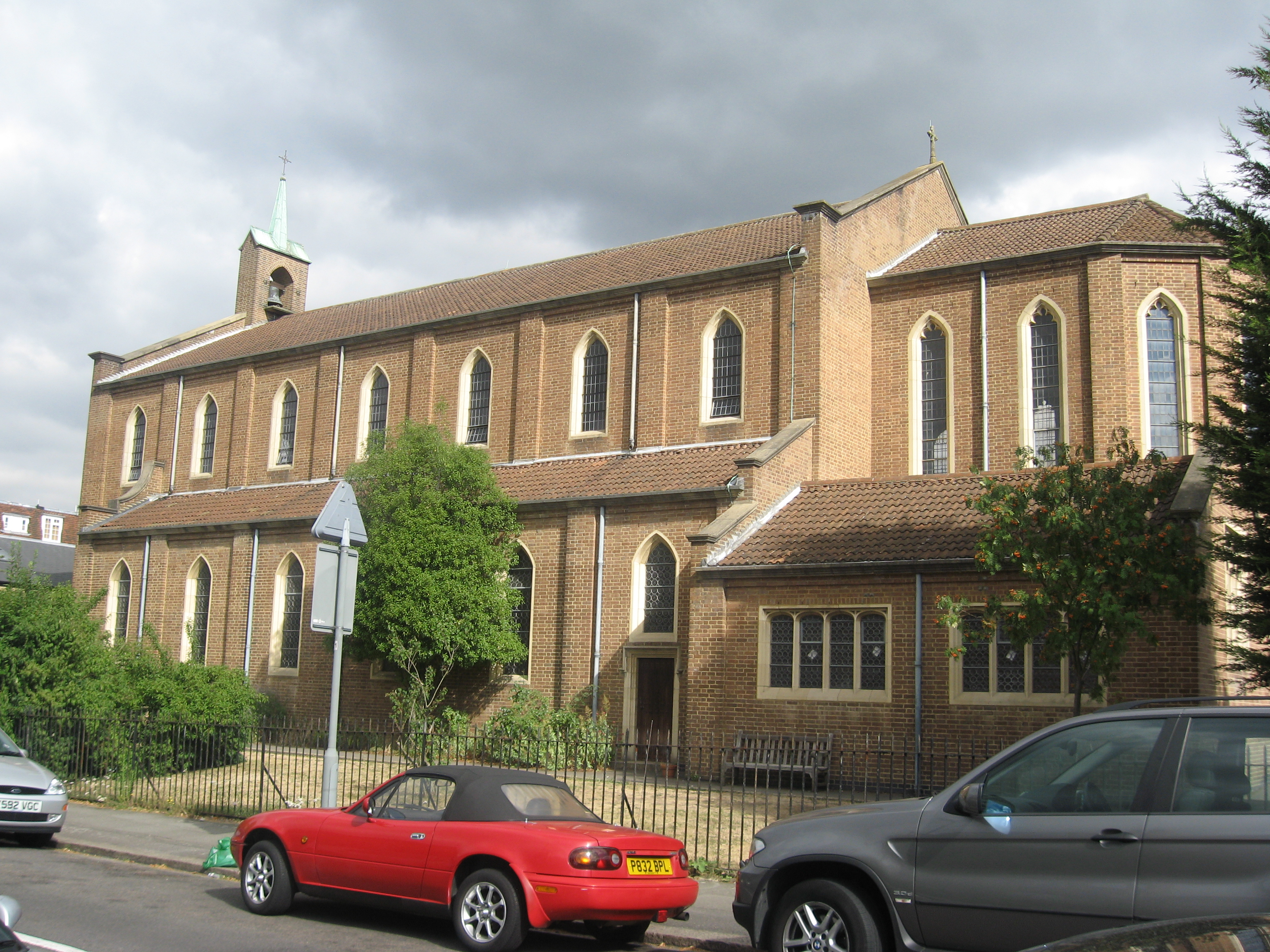

St Matthew's Church, Wimbledon is a Church of England parish church on Durham Road in West Wimbledon, London. Its 1910 building by Ernest Charles Shearman was damaged during the Second World War and replaced in 1958 with the present one, designed by Sebastian Comper.
