= Temple Fortune =

Coordinates: 51.582°N 0.198°W

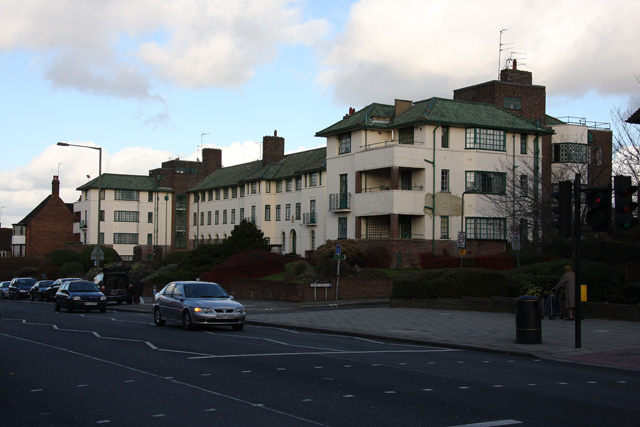
- The Pantiles, Temple Fortune

- Location within Greater London
- London borough: Barnet
- Ceremonial county: Greater London
- Region: London
- Country: England
- Sovereign state: United Kingdom
- Post town: LONDON
- Postcode district: NW11
- Dialling code: 020
- Police: Metropolitan
- Fire: London
- Ambulance: London
- UK Parliament: Finchley and Golders Green
- London Assembly: Barnet and Camden

Temple Fortune is a place in the London Borough of Barnet to the north of Golders Green. It is principally a shopping district used by residents of the Hampstead Garden Suburb. Between here and Golders Green, at Hoop Lane are two cemeteries – Golders Green Jewish Cemetery and Golders Green Crematorium. Religious buildings include the Catholic Church of St Edward the Confessor, St. Mary & Archangel Michael Coptic Orthodox Church, and North Western Reform Synagogue (also known as Alyth Shul).

== History ==
"Temple" derives from the Knights Templar, a medieval Christian military order which held a sub-manor in the area, while 'Fortune' may come from foran tun, a settlement in front of the main one. Here a lane from Finchley, called Ducksetters Lane (c.1475), intersected. It is likely that the settlement was originally the Bleccanham estate (c.900s). By the end of the 18th century Temple Fortune Farm was established on the northern side of Farm Close.

The building of the Finchley Road (c.1827) replaced Ducksetters Lane as a route to Finchley and resulted in the development of a small hamlet. Hendon Park Row (c.1860s) is of this period, and consisted of around thirty small dwellings built by a George Stevens, which were, with two exceptions, demolished (c.1956). A small dame school and prayer house run by Anglican Deaconesses existed in the 1890s and 1900s, which developed to become St Barnabas (1915). Along the Finchley Road was a number of villas (c1830s), joined by the Royal Oak public house (c.1850s). By the end of the 19th century there were around 300 people living in the area, which included a laundry, a small hospital for children with skin diseases. The principal industry was brickmaking.

In 1895 a Jewish cemetery was established adjacent to Hoop Lane, with the first burial in 1897. Golders Green Crematorium opened in 1902 (although much of it was built after 1905). The significant moment in Temple Fortune's development into a suburban area occurred in 1907. The establishment of the Hampstead Garden Suburb brought major changes to the area east of the Finchley Road. Temple Fortune Farm was demolished, and along the front of the road, the building of Arcade, and Gateway House (c.1911) established the Hampstead Garden Suburbs retail district. Also significant in that year was the opening of Golders Green tube station. Although the area had been served by horse-drawn omnibuses (since at least the 1880s) and later motor buses (from 1907), it was the tram line of 1910, connecting Church End with Golders Green Station, which led to the development of the area west of the Finchley Road. A Carmelite Monastery was established in Bridge Lane in 1908.

St Edward the Confessor, a Roman Catholic church, was built in 1916.

The now demolished Orpheum Theatre (1930), was intended to rival the Hippodrome in Golders Green. It was for a long time a huge Odeon cinema, seating over 1,800 people, but a sheltered accommodation building (Birnbeck Court) now stands on the site at 850, Finchley Road.

St Barnabas church was closed in 1994 and re-dedicated in 1996 as St. Mary & Archangel Michael Coptic Orthodox Church; the Carmelite Monastery was acquired for residential development in 2007, to become Carmel Gate.

== Geography ==
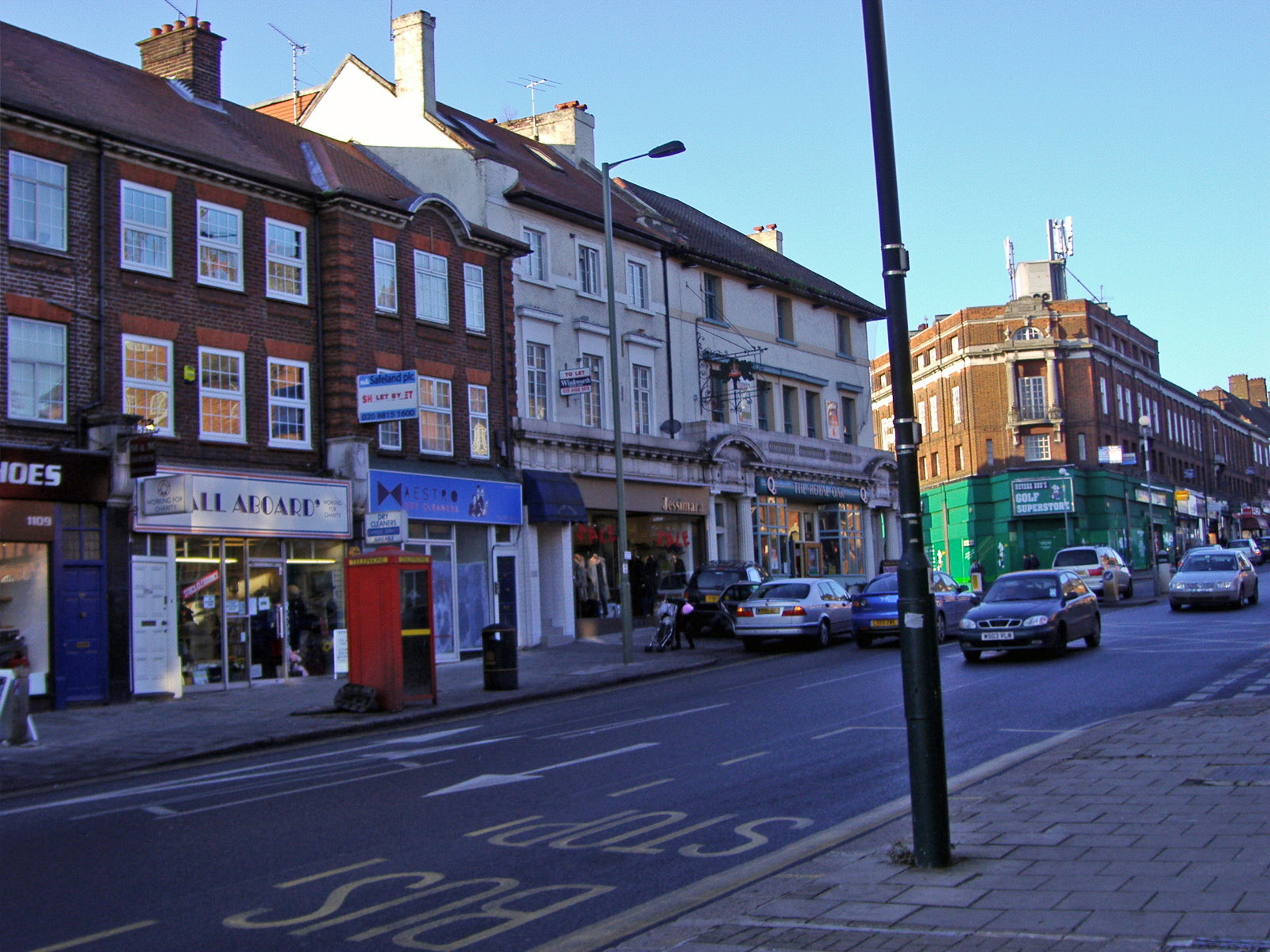
Shops in Finchley Road, Temple Fortune

It is located on Finchley Road just south of Henlys Corner junction and north of Golders Green.

=== Transport ===
London bus routes 13, 102, 460 and N13 (night) serve the Finchley Road here. Brent Cross tube station, Golders Green tube station (both on Northern line Edgware branch) and Finchley Central tube station (on the Northern line High Barnet branch) are the nearest train stations.

== Recreation ==
The Temple Fortune Club is a private sports club established in 1922, offering bowls, squash and tennis. It is for members only and does not have 'pay and play' facilities in any section.

Temple Fortune Football Club was formed on 28 December 1968 at Princes Park by a group of local youngsters who originally played in the park in the mid-1960s. The club joined the Maccabi (Southern) Football League (MGBSFL) in 1976 and were founder members of the Maccabi Masters Football League (veterans) in 1999. Having played at numerous venues in the London Borough of Barnet and Harrow, the club currently hosts home matches at Silver Jubilee Park in Kingsbury where a brand-new artificial pitch was laid in June 2022. The club's traditional colours are yellow, red and navy blue, which have been mainly worn since 1985. The club's crest is a shield with 'TFFC' lettering in white on a red panel, above a navy blue panelled football centred on a yellow background with red pinstripes. The wording 'Founded 1968' appears curved under the football, coloured navy blue. The club's motto is 'Fortune Favours The Brave'. In 2018 TFFC celebrated its golden anniversary by holding a commemorative lunch, attended by long-serving members and David Wolff (chairman of the MGBSFL) and a special match at Princes Park, on the very pitch where small-sided games had been played leading up to the formation in 1968. The club also produced a 104-page book to commemorate 50 years of existence. One of the club's founders, Nigel Kyte, still runs the main admin of Temple Fortune FC over 53 years on as the club chairman. The club currently runs three league teams and the First Team manager is Simon Linden who is also the vice-chairman. Kerry Higham became the second female member to serve on the club's management committee when elected in June 2022. The club's website is www.tffc.co.uk and social media accounts are run on Facebook, Twitter and Instagram. (Source: Temple Fortune FC website archives, verified by club chairman and TFFC historian Nigel Kyte. Updated: November 2022)
