= Ernest Charles Shearman =

British architect

Ernest Charles Shearman (1859 – 17 April 1939) was a British architect.

== Early life ==
Shearman was born in 1859, the son of Charles James Shearman, a physician.

== Career ==
In 1878 Shearman was articled to Charles Barry, remaining his assistant until 1888, the year he set off for Argentina, where he was architect to the Buenos Aires Great Southern Railway until 1891. On his return to the United Kingdom in 1892 Shearman was elected an Associate of the Royal Institute of British Architects, and ten years later he began to practice independently.

Shearman was especially prolific in London, where he designed six churches between 1910 and 1935: St Matthew's Church, Wimbledon; St Silas Church, Kentish Town; St Barnabas Church, North Ealing; St Gabriel's Church, North Acton; St Barnabas Church, Temple Fortune and St Francis of Assisi Church, Isleworth. He also designed the west end of St Mark's Church, Leicester.

== Personal life ==
Shearman married Marian Catherine McGowran in August 1885 and had four children.

Shearman died in Winchester in 1939.

== Bibliography ==
- John Salmon, Ernest Charles Shearman (1859–1939). An Anglo-Catholic Architect. An Illustrated Introduction to his Work. (Anglo-Catholic History Society, 2009)
- Diana Beckett, Ernest Shearman. Ecclesiastical Architect, 1859-1939. (2QT Publishing Ltd, 2021)
- Directory of British Architects 1834–1914. British Architectural Library
