= St Thomas's Church, Oakwood =

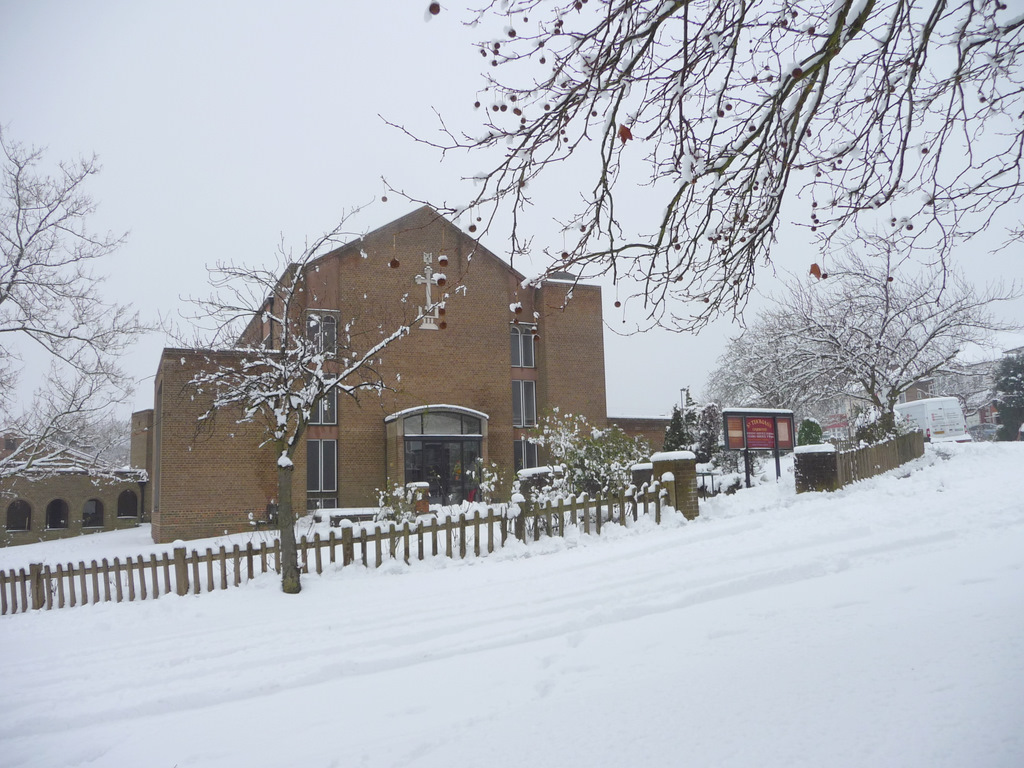

- Location within Greater London
- 51.64556°N 0.12675°W
- Location: Prince George Avenue, Oakwood, London, N14 4SN
- Country: England
- Denomination: Church of England
- Churchmanship: Conservative Evangelical
- Website: st-toms.org.uk

History
- Status: Active

Architecture
- Functional status: Parish church

Administration
- Diocese: Diocese of London
- Archdeaconry: Archdeaconry of Hampstead
- Deanery: Enfield
- Parish: St. Thomas, Oakwood

Clergy
- Bishop: The Rt Revd Rob Munro (AEO)
- Vicar: The Revd Richard Alldritt

St Thomas's Church, Oakwood is an Anglican church in the Enfield Deanery of the Diocese of London. It is located in Prince George Avenue in the Oakwood area of the London Borough of Enfield, England.

== History ==
St Thomas's is a modern Anglican church established in the 1930s as the suburb of Oakwood grew with the extension of the Piccadilly underground line to Cockfosters. Building stopped with the outbreak of the Second World War, and the church was not finished until the 1950s. The architect was Romilly Craze. Later a parish hall was added, and a distinctive tall green spire. There is a guide hut on the grounds across the car park from the main building.

Late in 2010 the spire was found to be unsafe and removed, however this was replaced at the beginning of 2012.

=== Present day ===
The church holds weekly services on Sundays.

St Thomas's is within the Conservative Evangelical tradition of the Church of England. As a parish that supports complementary gender roles, it receives alternative episcopal oversight from the Bishop of Ebbsfleet.

From May 2017 to 2018, St. Thomas' Oakwood was in interregnum; this followed the move of the previous vicar, Christopher Hobbs (1997-2017), to St Andrew's Church, Cheadle Hulme. On 16 April 2018, the next vicar, Rich Alldritt, was inducted at the church. The current musical director is David Reavley.
