= St Gabriel's Church, North Acton =

St Gabriel, North Acton
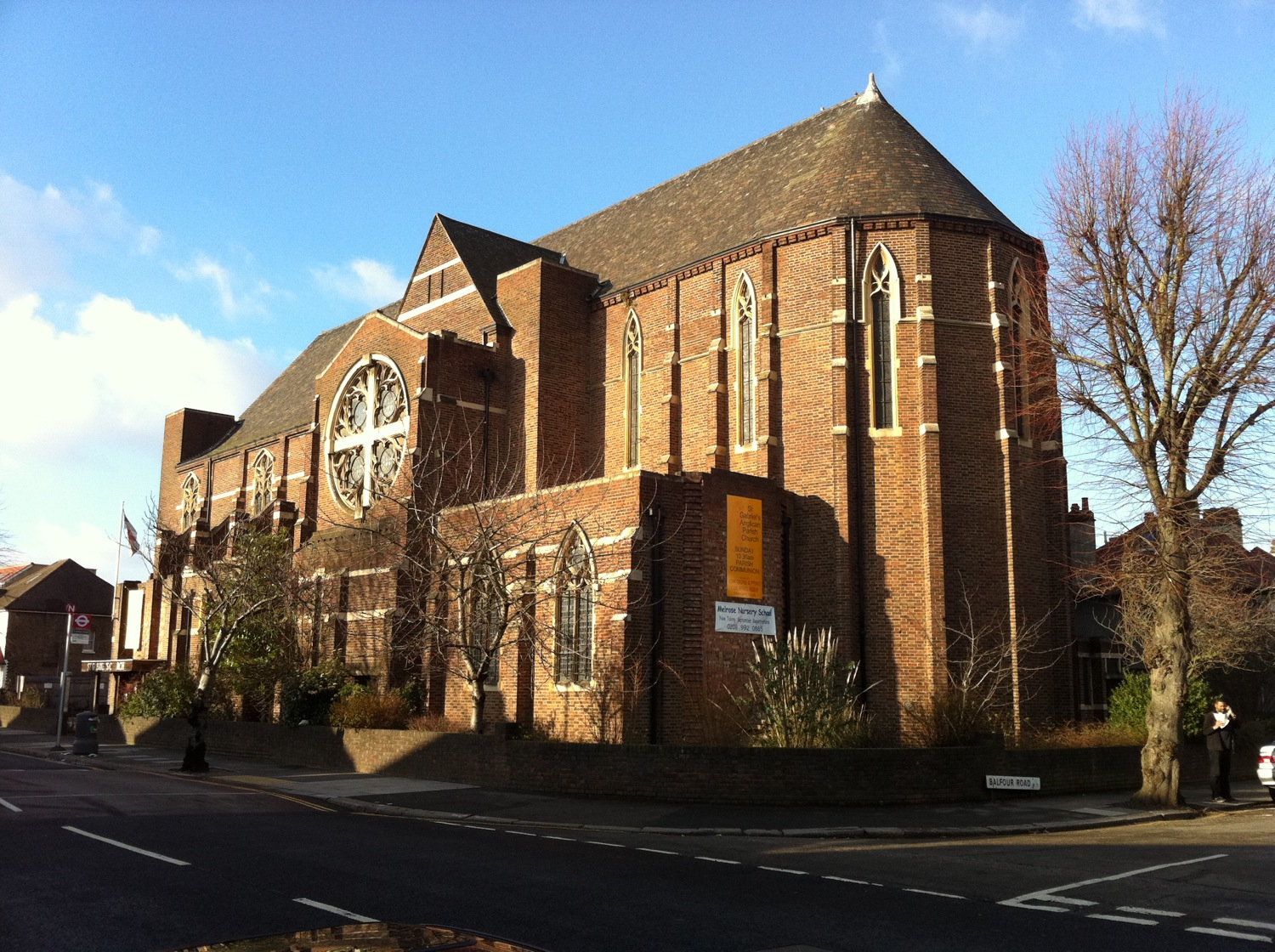
- St Gabriel's Church, the parish church of North Acton.
- St Gabriel, North Acton
- 51°31′11″N 0°16′0″W
- Country: England
- Denomination: Church of England
- Churchmanship: Anglo-Catholic
- Website: www.saintgabrielacton.org

History
- Founded: 1920
- Founder: Arthur Winnington-Ingram
- Consecrated: 18 July 1931

Architecture
- Architect: Ernest Charles Shearman
- Years built: 1929–31

Administration
- Province: Province of Canterbury
- Diocese: Diocese of London
- Deanery: Ealing
- Parish: North Acton

Clergy
- Vicar: The Revd Timothy L'Estrange

St Gabriel's Church is the Church of England parish church for North Acton and Park Royal. It is located on Noel Road, beside North Acton Playing Fields.

St Gabriel's was one of the forty new churches 'planted' in the 1920s and 1930s by Arthur Winnington-Ingram, Bishop of London, to serve London's expanding suburbs. The church was designed and built by architect Ernest Charles Shearman, and houses an original painting (The Annunciation) by artist John Pelling, and two 1870 George Tinworth stone friezes entitled The Brazen Serpent and Descent from the Cross which were removed from St Mary Magdalene Church, Sandringham and donated to St Gabriel's by the Royal Collection in 1930 following a construction appeal. Other points of interest include a high altar frontal used at the Coronation of Queen Elizabeth II, and a stone font originally located in Westminster Abbey, and still bearing carved stone symbols of the abbey. The church celebrated its eightieth anniversary in July 2011.
