= Princes Park, Temple Fortune =

Park in Temple Fortune, London, England

Coordinates: 51.5820°N 0.2061°W

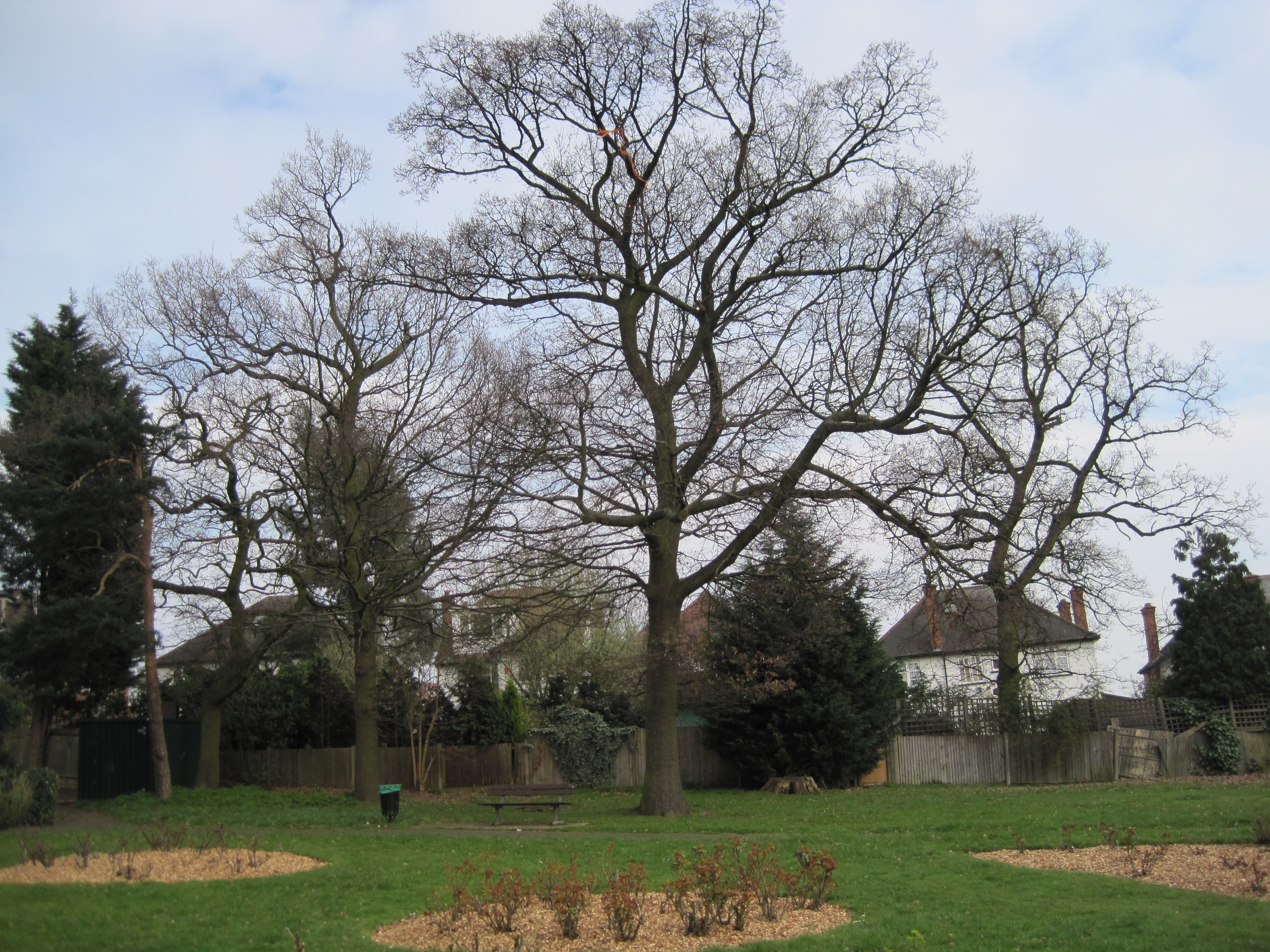

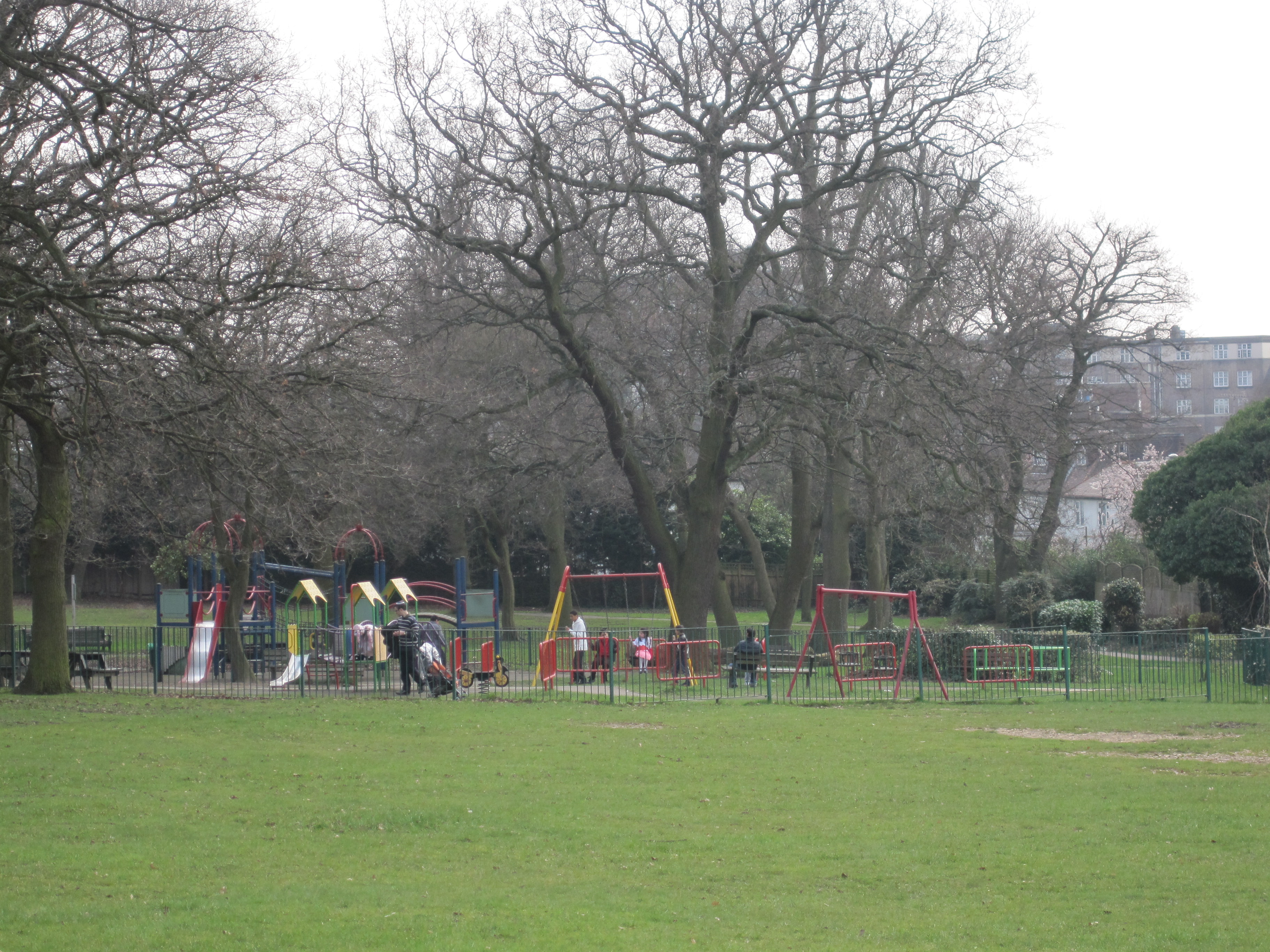

Princes Park is a small public park and Site of Local Importance for Nature Conservation in Temple Fortune in the London Borough of Barnet.

== History ==
Princes Park was laid out as a public park in 1923. The area was shown as wooded on a 1796 map, and it has mature oak trees that predate local housing. A wild service-tree and crab apple also show a long history, while hawthorn hedges are probably remnants of farm hedgerows.

== Amenities ==
It has two tennis courts and a children's playground.

There is access from Oakfields Road and Park Way.

In February 2018 a memorial for Sir Nicholas Winton was installed.

== See also ==
- Barnet parks and open spaces
- Nature reserves in Barnet
