= Princes Park (Auburn) =

Sports ground in Sydney, Australia

- Pairc na Prionsa
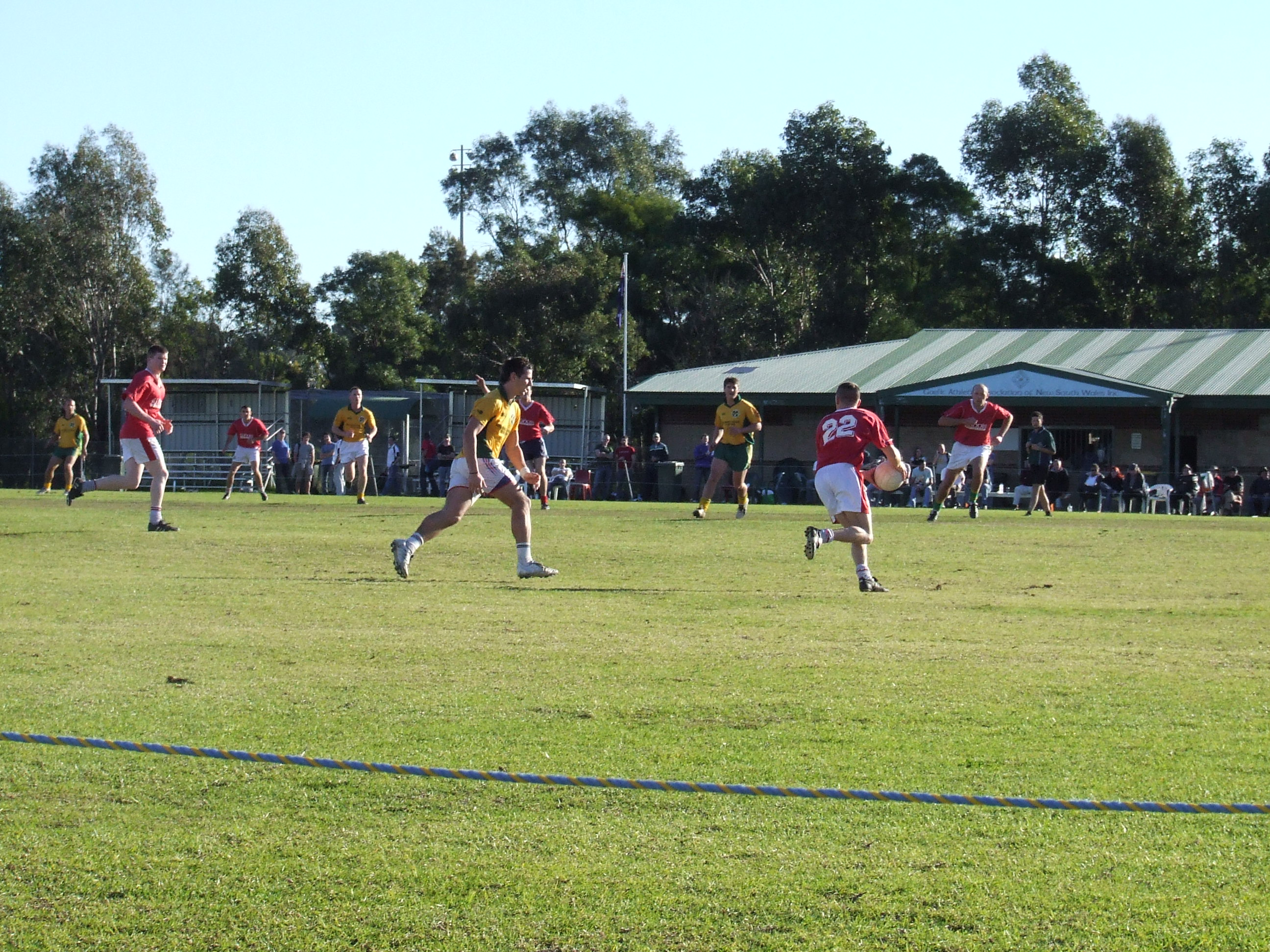
- Location: Sydney, New South Wales, Australia
- Coordinates: 33°52′24.29″S 151°0′48.55″E
- Owner: Cumberland Council

Princes Park is a sports ground in Auburn, Sydney, New South Wales, Australia. It was the home of the New South Wales Gaelic football and hurling teams. The ground has an undefined capacity with four temporary stands acting as makeshift seating with plenty of standing room available around the pitches four sides. Gaelic football, hurling and camogie were played in league and championship format there between the months of March and September.

On Sunday 2 November 2008 an Australasian gaelic football Select IX played the Irish International Rules football squad in a game of gaelic football at Princes Park. The game finished in a draw.

It has since 2011 been used as an amateur football pitch.

== See also ==
- List of GAA Stadiums by Capacity
- Stadiums of Ireland
