= Romilly Craze =

English architect (1892–1974)

Romilly Bernard Craze (1892–1974) was an English architect.

== Life ==
He was the son of George Henry Craze and his wife Louisa Mary Webb. He was born in 1892, and baptised on 17 February 1900 in St Luke's Church, West Norwood.

He married Elizabeth Ethel Dutton on 6 September 1919.

Craze worked in partnership with Sir William Victor Mordaunt Milner, with whom he formed the firm of Milner & Craze. He spent much of his career repairing churches damaged by bombing during the Second World War, but also produced some distinctive churches of his own.

== Works ==
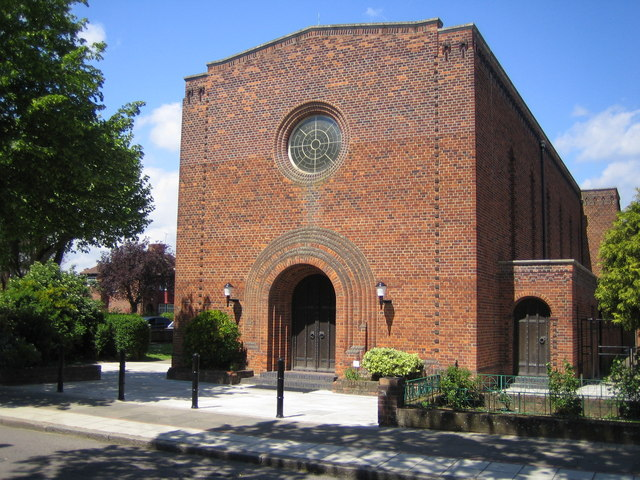
All Saints' Church, Kingsbury (also known as All Saints' Church, Queensbury) consecrated in 1954

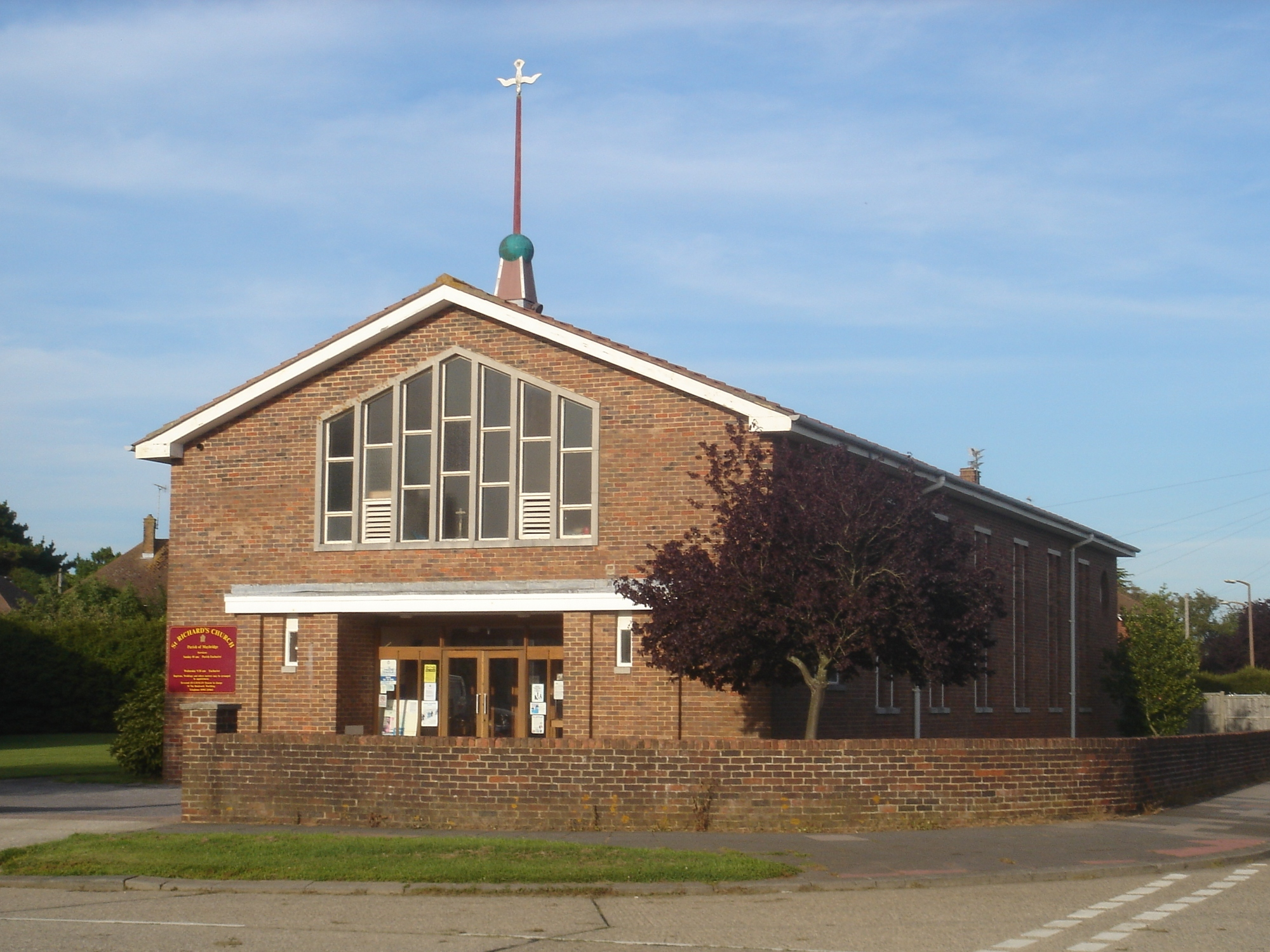
St Richard's Church, Maybridge 1966

- Christ Church, St Leonards-on-Sea, internal improvements, 1933.
- Offices, workshops and a garage for the Stepney Carrier Co. at 94–100 St John Street, London, 1935. Demolished.
- Shrine of Our Lady of Walsingham, Norfolk, 1937.
- St. Martin's Church, Hull, 1939.
- St Paul's Church, Arbourthorne, Sheffield 1939.
- St Thomas's Church, Oakwood, 1939.
- St Luke's Church, Camberwell, 1954.
- All Saints’ Church, Kingsbury, 1954.
- St Mary Abbots, Kensington, new ceiling, 1955.
- St Aidan's Church, Hull, 1955.
- St. Mary's Church, Southampton, 1956.
- St George's Cathedral, Southwark Rebuilding, 1953 - 1958.
- St Cuthbert's Church, Wembley, 1959.
- St Barnabas Church, Temple Fortune, nave, 1962
- St Richard's Church, Maybridge, Goring-by-Sea, 1966.
- St Thomas’ Church, Kensal Town, 1967.
- SS Peter & Paul, Enfield Lock, 1969.
- Church of the Ascension, Stirchley, Birmingham, 1973.
