= History of the Byzantine Empire =

The Byzantine Empire's history is generally periodised from late antiquity until the Fall of Constantinople in 1453 AD. From the 3rd to 6th centuries, the Greek East and Latin West of the Roman Empire gradually diverged, marked by Diocletian's (r. 284–305) formal partition of its administration in 285, the establishment of an eastern capital in Constantinople by Constantine I in 330, (Note: The first instance of the designation "New Rome" in an official document is found in the canons of the First Council of Constantinople (381), where it is used to justify the claim that the patriarchal seat of Constantinople is second only to that of Rome.) and the adoption of Christianity as the state religion under Theodosius I (r. 379–395), with others such as Roman polytheism being proscribed. Although the Western half of the Roman Empire had collapsed in 476, the Eastern half remained stable and emerged as one of the most powerful states in Europe, a title it held for most of its existence. Under the reign of Heraclius (r. 610–641), the Empire's military and administration were restructured and adopted Greek for official use instead of Latin. While there was an unbroken continuity in administration and other features of Roman society, historians have often distinguished the Byzantine epoch from earlier eras in Roman history for reasons including the imperial seat moving from Rome to Constantinople and the predominance of Greek instead of Latin.

The borders of the Empire evolved significantly over its existence, as it went through several cycles of decline and recovery. During the reign of Justinian I (r. 527–565), the Empire reached its greatest extent after reconquering much of the historically Roman western Mediterranean coast, including north Africa, Italy, and Rome itself, which it held for two more centuries. During the reign of Maurice (r. 582–602), the Empire's eastern frontier was expanded and the north stabilised. However, his assassination caused a two-decade-long war with Sassanid Persia which exhausted the Empire's resources and contributed to major territorial losses during the Muslim conquests of the 7th century. In a matter of years the Empire lost its richest provinces, Egypt and Syria, to the Arabs.

During the Macedonian dynasty (9th–11th centuries), the Empire again expanded and experienced a two-century long renaissance, which came to an end with the loss of much of Asia Minor to the Seljuk Turks after the Battle of Manzikert in 1071. This battle opened the way for the Turks to settle in Anatolia as a homeland. The final centuries of the Empire exhibited a general trend of decline. It struggled to recover during the 12th century, but was delivered a mortal blow during the Fourth Crusade, when Constantinople was sacked and the Empire dissolved and divided into competing Byzantine Greek and Latin realms. Despite the eventual recovery of Constantinople and re-establishment of the Empire in 1261, Byzantium remained only one of several small rival states in the area for the final two centuries of its existence. Its remaining territories were progressively annexed by the Ottomans over the 15th century. The Fall of Constantinople to the Ottoman Empire in 1453 finally ended the Roman Empire.

== Tetrarchy ==
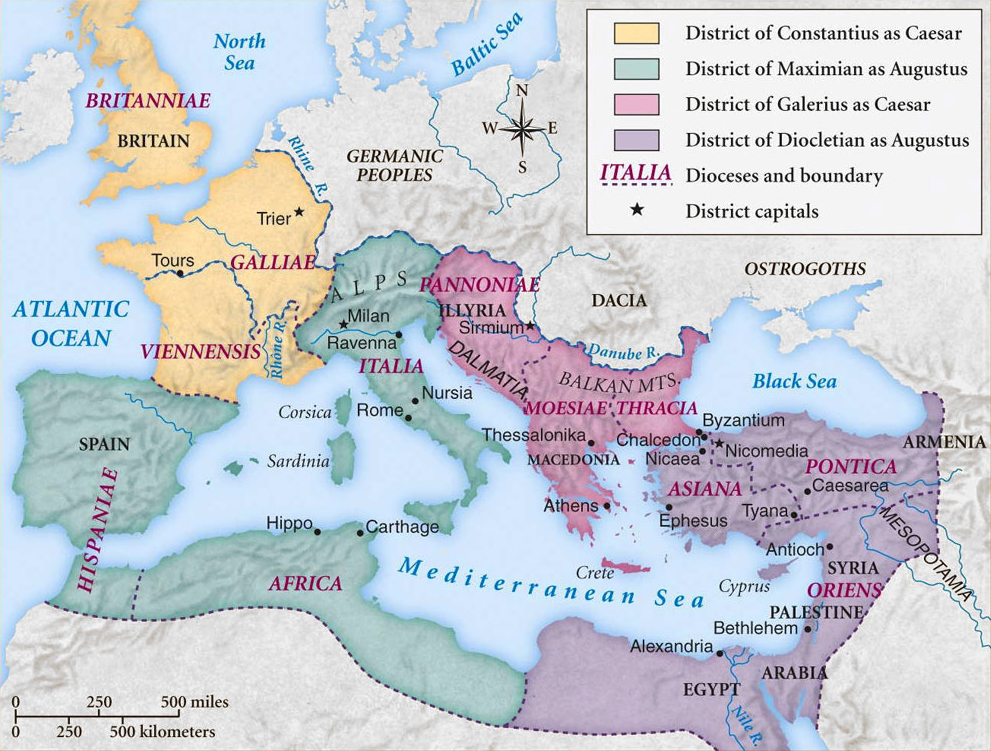
Map of the Roman Empire showing the four Tetrarchs' zones of influence after Diocletian's reforms.

During the 3rd century, three crises threatened the Roman Empire: external invasions, internal civil wars and an economy riddled with weaknesses and problems. The city of Rome gradually became less important as an administrative centre. The crisis of the 3rd century displayed the defects of the heterogeneous system of government that Augustus had established to administer his immense dominion. His successors had introduced some modifications, but events made it clearer that a new, more centralized and more uniform system was required.

Diocletian was responsible for creating a new administrative system (the tetrarchy). He associated himself with a co-emperor, or Augustus. Each Augustus was then to adopt a young colleague, or Caesar, to share in the rule and eventually to succeed the senior partner. After the abdication of Diocletian and Maximian, however, the tetrachy collapsed, and Constantine I replaced it with the dynastic principle of hereditary succession.

== Constantine I and his successors ==
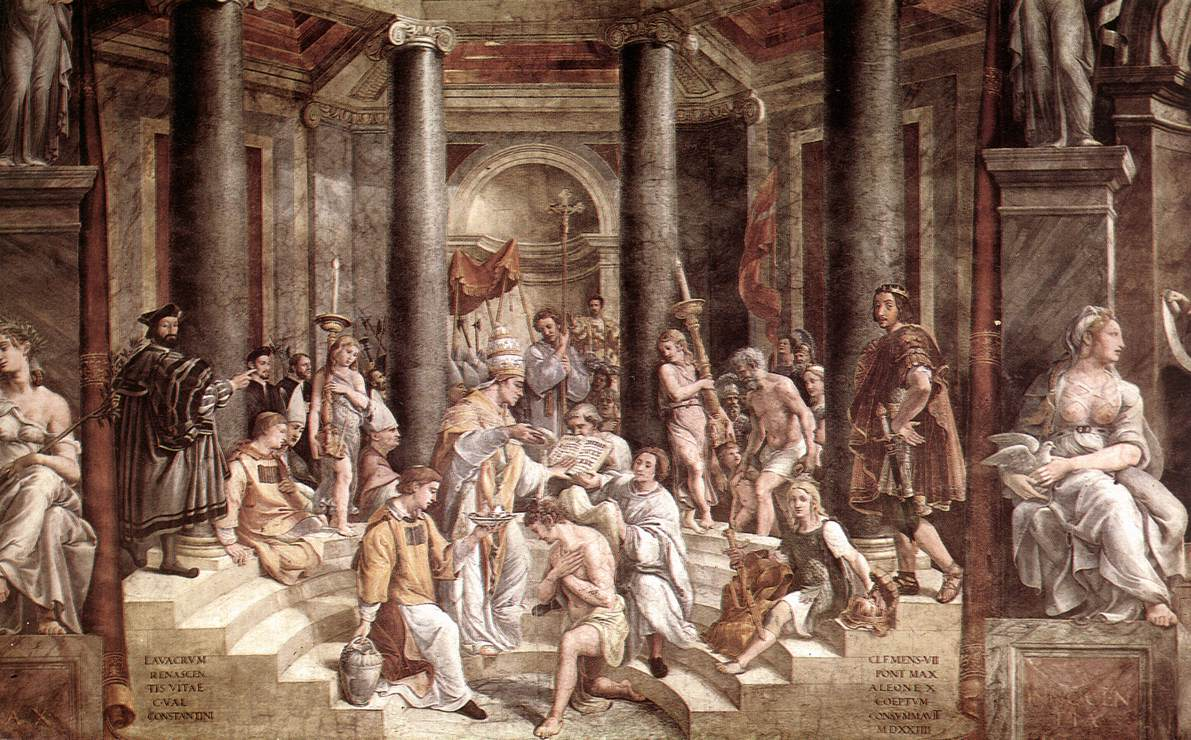
The Baptism of Constantine, painted by pupils of Raphael (1520–1524, fresco, Vatican City, Apostolic Palace). Eusebius of Caesaria records that Constantine delayed receiving baptism until shortly before his death, as was customary among Christian converts at the time.

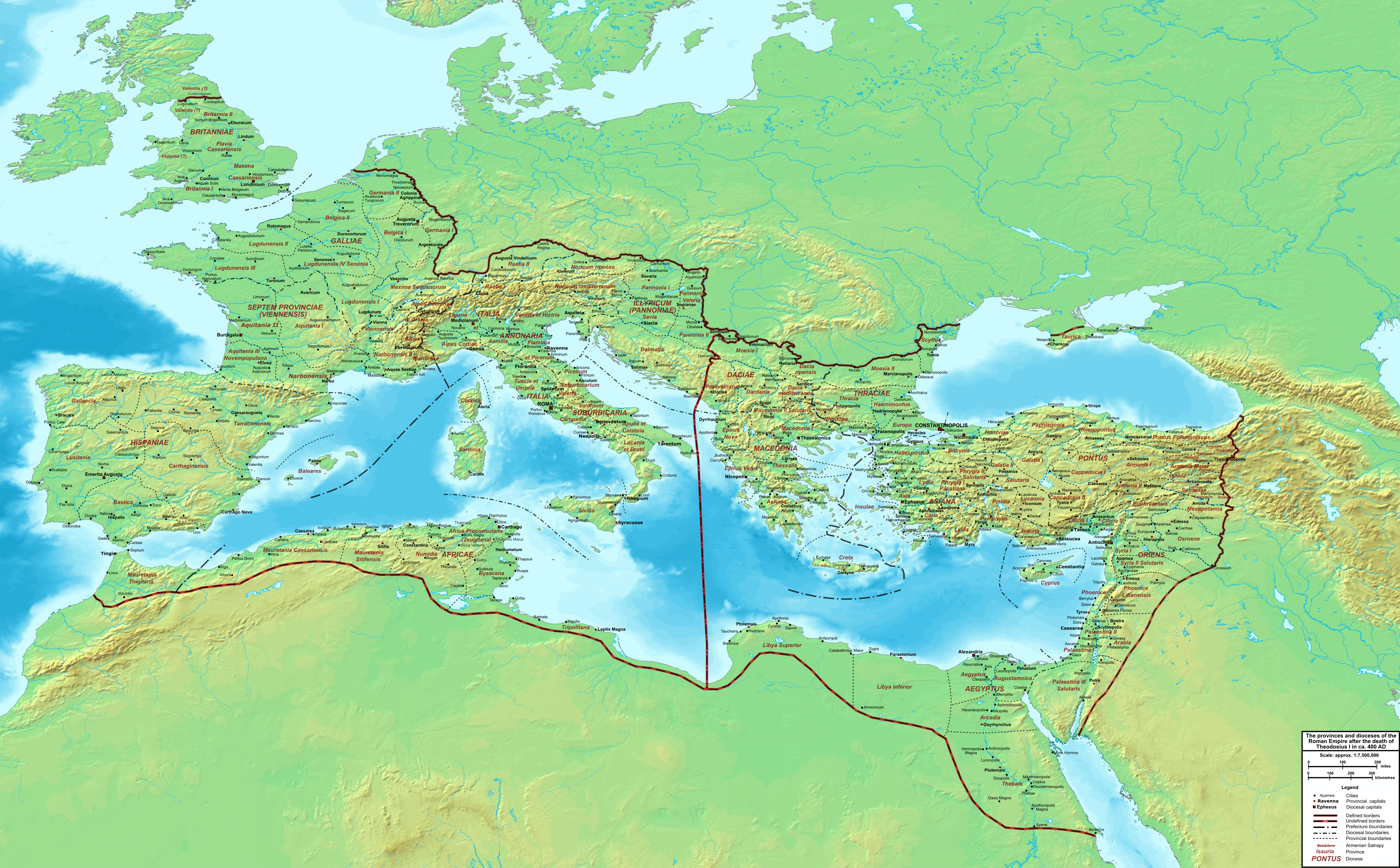
The dioceses and provinces of the Roman Empire in 395, before the final partition into Eastern and Western empires.

Constantine moved the seat of the Empire, and introduced important changes into its civil and religious constitution. In 330, he founded Constantinople as a second Rome on the site of Byzantium, which was well-positioned astride the trade routes between East and West; it was a superb base from which to guard the Danube river, and was reasonably close to the Eastern frontiers. Constantine also began the building of the great fortified walls, which were expanded and rebuilt in subsequent ages. J. B. Bury asserts that "the foundation of Constantinople [...] inaugurated a permanent division between the Eastern and Western, the Greek and the Latin, halves of the Empire—a division to which events had already pointed—and affected decisively the whole subsequent history of Europe."

Constantine built upon the administrative reforms introduced by Diocletian. He stabilized the coinage (the gold solidus that he introduced became a highly prized and stable currency), and made changes to the structure of the army. Under Constantine, the Empire had recovered much of its military strength and enjoyed a period of stability and prosperity. He also reconquered southern parts of Dacia, after defeating the Visigoths in 332, and he was planning a campaign against Sassanid Persia as well. To divide administrative responsibilities, Constantine replaced the single praetorian prefect, who had traditionally exercised both military and civil functions, with regional prefects enjoying civil authority alone. In the course of the 4th century, four great sections emerged from these Constantinian beginnings, and the practice of separating civil from military authority persisted until the 7th century.

Constantine the Great inaugurated the Constantine's Bridge (Danube) at Sucidava, (today Celei in Romania) in 328, in order to reconquer Dacia, a province that had been abandoned under Aurelian. He won a victory in the war and extended his control over the South Dacia, as remains of camps and fortifications in the region indicate.

Under Constantine, Christianity did not become the exclusive religion of the state, but enjoyed imperial preference, since the Emperor supported it with generous privileges: clerics were exempted from personal services and taxation, Christians were preferred for administrative posts, and bishops were entrusted with judicial responsibilities. Constantine established the principle that emperors should not settle questions of doctrine, but should summon general ecclesiastical councils for that purpose. The Synod of Arles was convened by Constantine, and the First Council of Nicaea showcased his claim to be head of the Church.

The state of the Empire in 395 may be described in terms of the outcome of Constantine's work. The dynastic principle was established so firmly that the emperor who died in that year, Theodosius I, could bequeath the imperial office jointly to his sons: Arcadius in the East and Honorius in the West. Theodosius was the last emperor to rule over the full extent of the empire in both its halves.

The Eastern Empire was largely spared the difficulties faced by the West in the third and fourth centuries, due in part to a more firmly established urban culture and greater financial resources, which allowed it to placate invaders with tribute and pay foreign mercenaries. Throughout the fifth century, various invading armies overran the Western Empire but spared the east. Theodosius II further fortified the walls of Constantinople, leaving the city impervious to most attacks; the walls were not breached until 1204. To fend off the Huns of Attila, Theodosius gave them subsidies (purportedly 300 kg (700 lb) of gold). Moreover, he favored merchants living in Constantinople who traded with the Huns and other foreign groups.

His successor, Marcian, refused to continue to pay this exorbitant sum. However, Attila had already diverted his attention to the Western Roman Empire. After he died in 453, his empire collapsed and Constantinople initiated a profitable relationship with the remaining Huns, who would eventually fight as mercenaries in Byzantine armies.

== Leonid dynasty ==
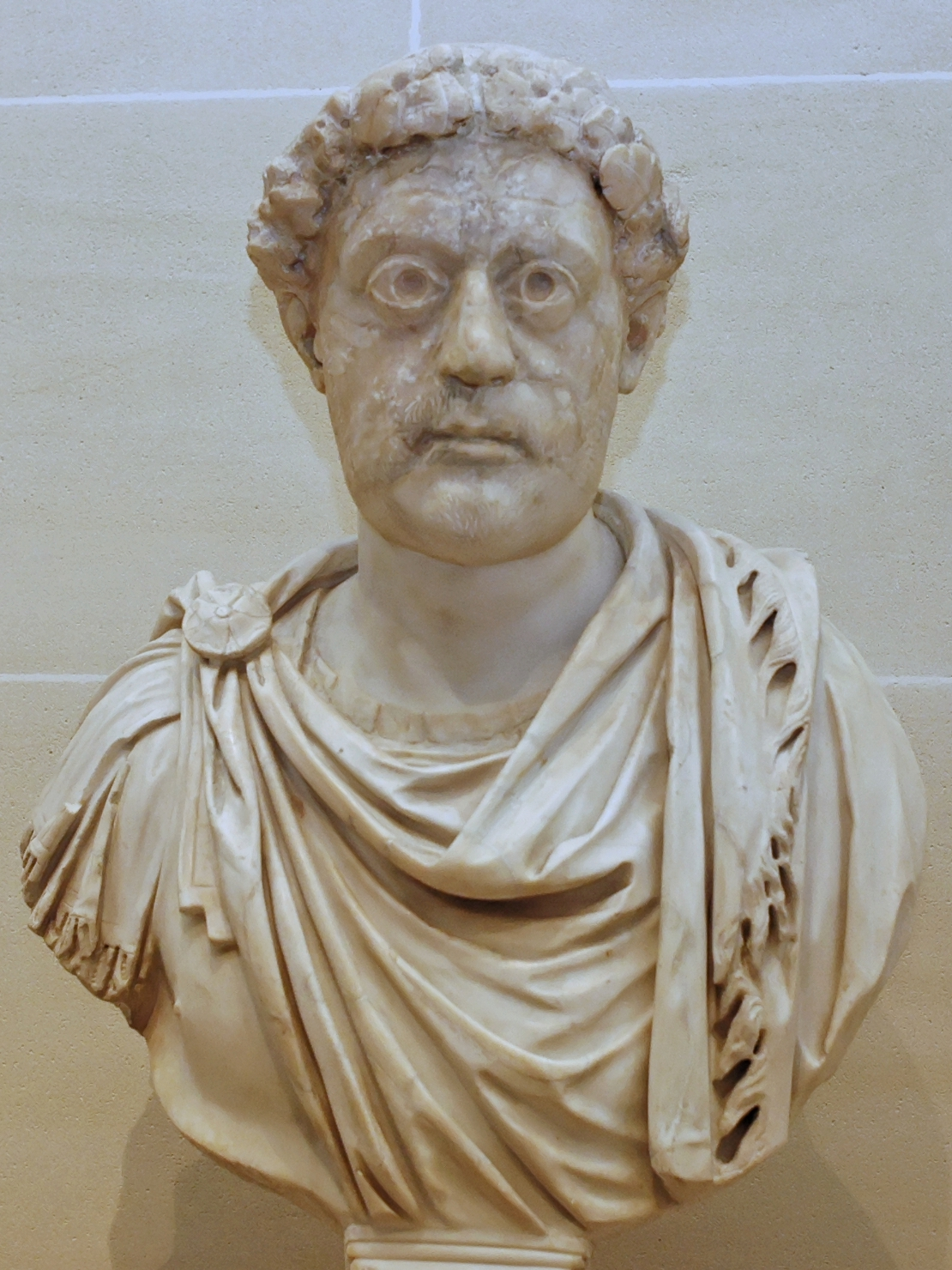
Leo I of the Byzantine Empire (401–474, reigned 457–474)

Leo I succeeded Marcian as emperor, and after the fall of Attila, the true chief in Constantinople was the Alan general Aspar. Leo I managed to free himself from the influence of the non-Orthodox chief by supporting the rise of the Isaurians, a semi-barbarian tribe living in southern Anatolia. Aspar and his son Ardabur were murdered in a riot in 471, and henceforth, Constantinople restored Orthodox leadership for centuries.

Leo was also the first emperor to receive the crown not from a military leader, but from the Patriarch of Constantinople, representing the ecclesiastical hierarchy. This change became permanent, and in the Middle Ages the religious characteristic of the coronation completely supplanted the old military form. In 468, Leo unsuccessfully attempted to reconquer North Africa from the Vandals. By that time, the Western Roman Empire was restricted to Italy and the lands south of the Danube as far as the Balkans (the Angles and Saxons had been invading and settling Britain since the early decades of the 5th century; the Visigoths and Suebi had possessed portions of Hispania since 417, and the Vandals had entered Africa in 429; Gaul was contested by the Franks under Clovis I, Burgundians, Bretons, Visigoths and some Roman remnants; and Theodoric was destined to rule in Italy until 526).

In 466, as a condition of his Isaurian alliance, Leo married his daughter Ariadne to the Isaurian Tarasicodissa, who took the name Zeno. When Leo died in 474, Zeno and Ariadne's younger son succeeded to the throne as Leo II, with Zeno as regent. When Leo II died later that year, Zeno became emperor. The end of the Western Empire is sometimes dated to 476, early in Zeno's reign, when the Germanic Roman general Odoacer deposed the titular Western Emperor Romulus Augustulus, but declined to replace him with another puppet.

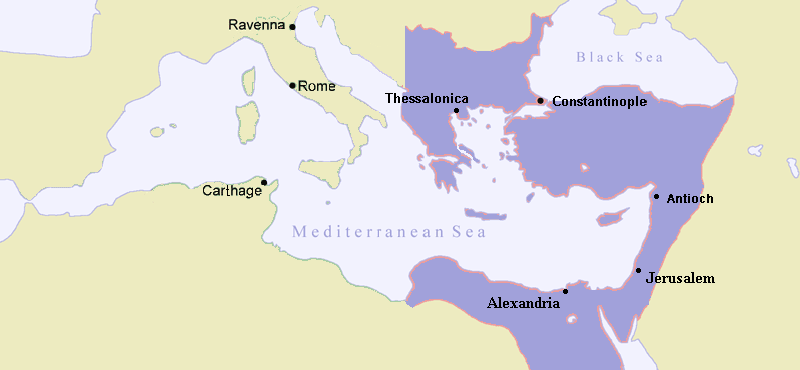
Eastern Roman Empire, c. AD 480

To recover Italy, Zeno could only negotiate with the Ostrogoths of Theodoric, who had settled in Moesia. He sent the gothic king to Italy as magister militum per Italiam ("commander in chief for Italy"). After the fall of Odoacer in 493, Theodoric, who had lived in Constantinople during his youth, ruled Italy on his own. Thus, by suggesting that Theodoric conquer Italy as his Ostrogothic kingdom, Zeno maintained at least a nominal supremacy in that western land while ridding the Eastern Empire of an unruly subordinate.

In 475, Zeno was deposed by Basiliscus, the general who led Leo I's 468 invasion of North Africa, but he recovered the throne twenty months later. However, he faced a new threat from another Isaurian, Leontius, who was also elected rival emperor. In 491 Anastasius I, an aged civil officer of Roman origin, became emperor, but it was not until 498 that the forces of the new emperor effectively took the measure of Isaurian resistance. Anastasius revealed himself to be an energetic reformer and an able administrator. He perfected Constantine I's coinage system by definitively setting the weight of the copper follis, the coin used in most everyday transactions. He also reformed the tax system, and permanently abolished the hated chrysargyron tax. The State Treasury contained the enormous sum of 320,000 pounds of gold when he died.

== Justinian I and his successors ==
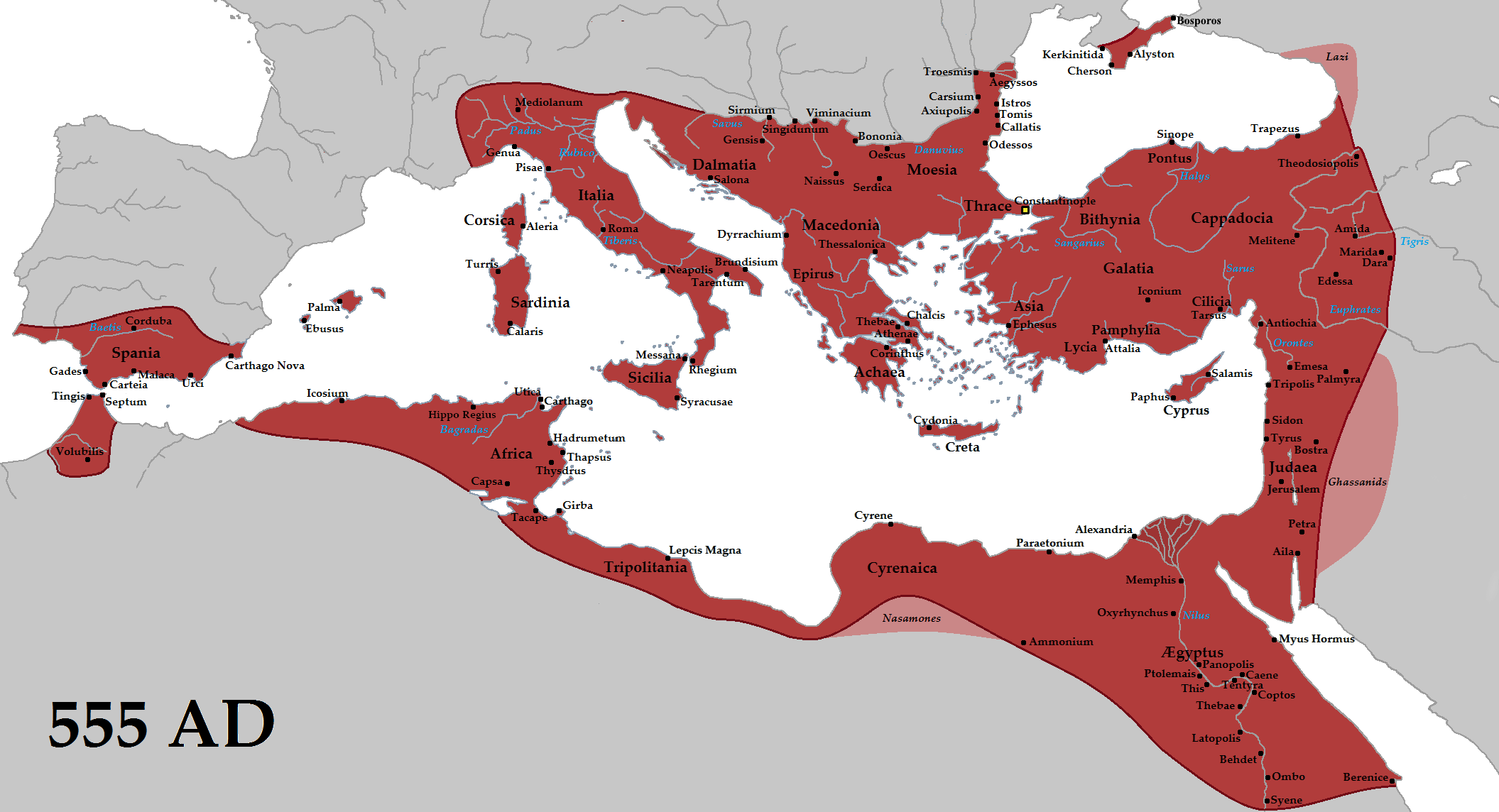
The Empire at its greatest extent under Justinian I, in 555 AD.

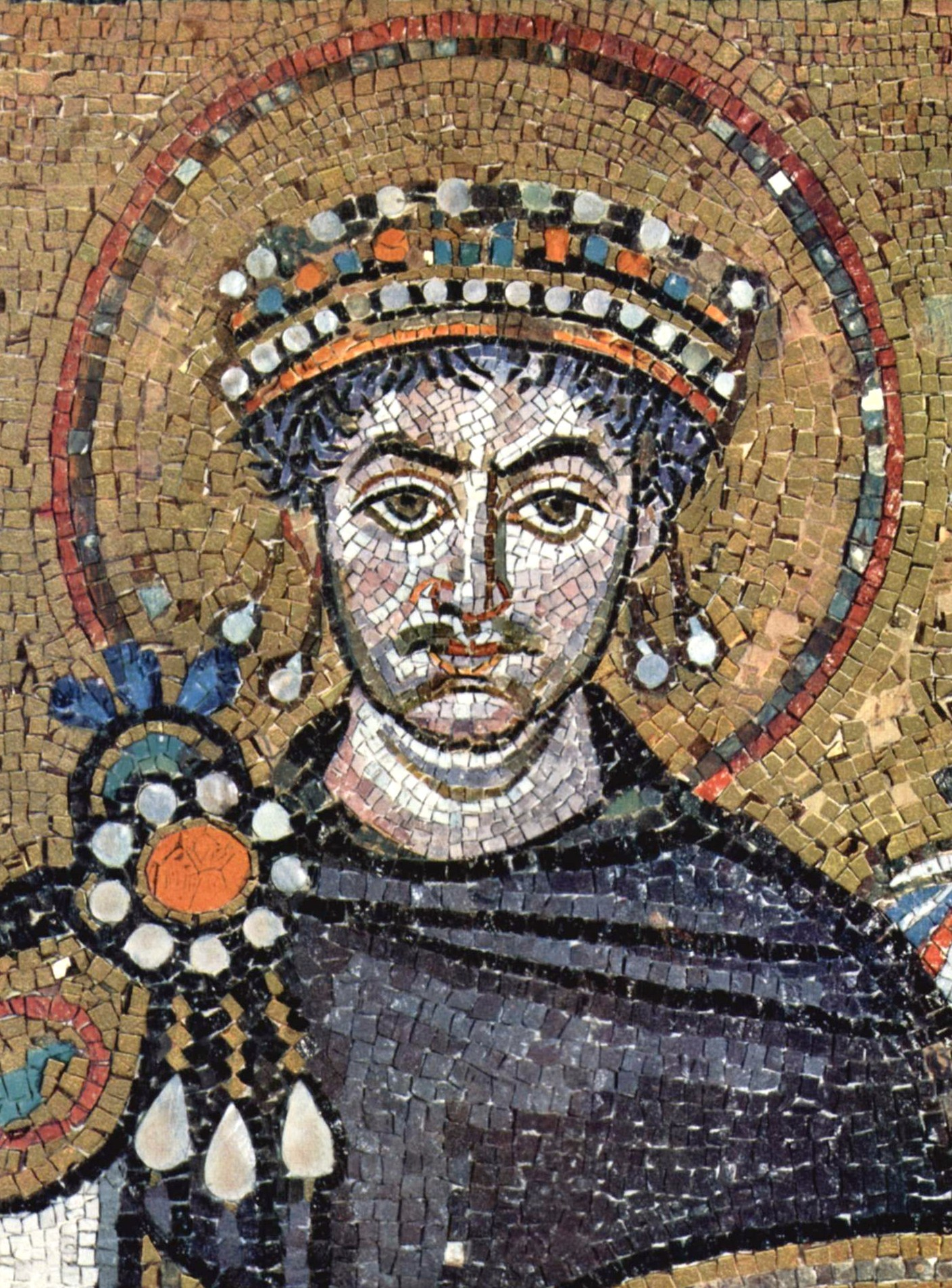
Justinian depicted on one of the famous mosaics of the Basilica of San Vitale, Ravenna.

The emperor who succeeded Anastasius I was Justin I, who was originally a peasant. However, he went to Constantinople along with his friends in pursuit of military service to the emperor. Justin was enlisted in the ranks of the palace guard, where he participated in many campaigns against the empire's adversaries. At the same time, Justin invited his nephew Justinian to the capital in order for Justinian to acquire an education. In 518, Anastasius died, and Justin I was elected to the throne. Justin I formally named Justinian as co-emperor in 527 and he died shortly after in that same year.

Justinian I, who assumed the throne in 527, oversaw a period of Byzantine expansion into former Roman territories. Justinian, the son of an Illyro-Roman peasant, may already have exerted effective control during the reign of his uncle, Justin I (518–527). In 532, attempting to secure his eastern frontier, Justinian signed a peace treaty with Khosrau I of Persia agreeing to pay a large tribute to the Sassanids. In the same year, Justinian survived a revolt in Constantinople (the Nika riots) which ended with the death of (allegedly) thirty thousand rioters. This victory solidified Justinian's power.

The western conquests began in 533, as Justinian sent his general Belisarius to reclaim the former province of Africa from the Vandals who had been in control since 429 with their capital at Carthage. Their success came with surprising ease, but it was not until 548 that the major local tribes were subdued. In Ostrogothic Italy, the deaths of Theodoric, his nephew and heir Athalaric, and his daughter Amalasuntha had left her murderer, Theodahad (r. 534–536), on the throne despite his weakened authority. In 535, a small Byzantine expedition to Sicily was met with easy success, but the Goths soon stiffened their resistance, and victory did not come until 540, when Belisarius captured Ravenna, after successful sieges of Naples and Rome. In 535–536, Pope Agapetus I was sent to Constantinople by Theodahad in order to request the removal of Byzantine forces from Sicily, Dalmatia, and Italy. Although Agapetus failed in his mission to sign a peace with Justinian, he succeeded in having the Miaphysite Patriarch Anthimus I of Constantinople denounced, despite empress Theodora's support and protection.

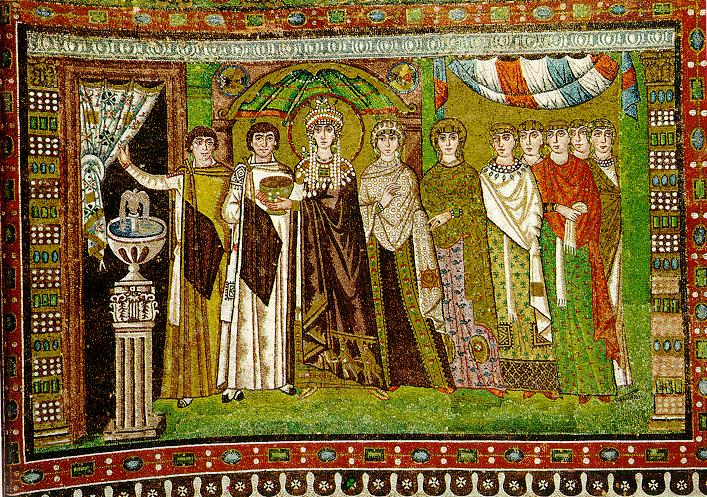
Theodora with her retinue (mosaic from Basilica of San Vitale, Ravenna). Justinian's influential wife was a former mime actress, whose earlier life is vividly described by Procopius in Secret History.

Nevertheless, the Ostrogoths were soon reunited under the command of Totila and captured Rome on 17 December 546; Belisarius was eventually recalled by Justinian in early 549. The arrival of the Armenian eunuch Narses in Italy (late 551) with an army of some 35,000 men marked another shift in Gothic fortunes. Totila was defeated and died at the Battle of Busta Gallorum. His successor, Teia, was likewise defeated at the Battle of Mons Lactarius (October 552). Despite continuing resistance from a few Goth garrisons and two subsequent invasions by the Franks and Alamanni, the war for the Italian peninsula was at an end. In 551, a noble of Visigothic Hispania, Athanagild, sought Justinian's help in a rebellion against the king, and the emperor dispatched a force under Liberius, who, although elderly, proved himself a successful military commander. The Byzantine empire held on to a small slice of the Spania coast until the reign of Heraclius.

In the east, Roman–Persian Wars continued until 561 when Justinian's and Khusro's envoys agreed on a 50-year peace. By the mid-550s, Justinian had won victories in most theatres of operation, with the notable exception of the Balkans, which were subjected to repeated incursions from the Slavs. In 559, the Empire faced a great invasion of Kutrigurs and Sclaveni. Justinian called Belisarius out of retirement, but once the immediate danger was over, the emperor took charge himself. The news that Justinian was reinforcing his Danube fleet made the Kutrigurs anxious, and they agreed to a treaty which gave them a subsidy and safe passage back across the river.

Justinian became universally famous because of his legislative work, remarkable for its sweeping character. In 529 a ten-man commission chaired by John the Cappadocian revised the ancient Roman legal code, creating the new Corpus Juris Civilis, a collection of laws that came to be referred to as "Justinian's Code". In the Pandects, completed under Tribonian's direction in 533, order and system were found in the contradictory rulings of the great Roman jurists, and a textbook, the Institutiones, was issued to facilitate instruction in the law schools. The fourth book, the Novellae, consisted of collections of imperial edicts promulgated between 534 and 565. Because of his ecclesiastical policies, Justinian came into collision with the Jews, the pagans, and various Christian sects. The latter included the Manichaeans, the Nestorians, the Monophysites, and the Arians. In order to completely eradicate paganism, Justinian closed the famous philosophic school in Athens in 529.

Exterior view of the Hagia Sophia, 2013

During the 6th century, the traditional Greco-Roman culture was still influential in the Eastern empire with prominent representatives such as the natural philosopher John Philoponus. Nevertheless, the Christian philosophy and culture were in the ascendant and began to dominate the older culture. Hymns written by Romanos the Melode marked the development of the Divine Liturgy, while architects and builders worked to complete the new Church of the Holy Wisdom, Hagia Sophia, designed to replace an older church destroyed in the course of the Nika revolt. Hagia Sophia stands today as one of the major monuments of architectural history. During the 6th and 7th centuries the Empire was struck by a series of epidemics, which would greatly devastate the population, contributing to a significant economic decline and weakening of the Empire.

After Justinian died in 565, his successor, Justin II refused to pay the large tribute to the Persians. Meanwhile, the Germanic Lombards invaded Italy; by the end of the century only a third of Italy was in Byzantine hands. Justin's successor, Tiberius II, choosing between his enemies, awarded subsidies to the Avars while taking military action against the Persians. Though Tiberius' general, Maurice, led an effective campaign on the eastern frontier, subsidies failed to restrain the Avars. They captured the Balkan fortress of Sirmium in 582, while the Slavs began to make inroads across the Danube. Maurice, who meanwhile succeeded Tiberius, intervened in a Persian civil war, placed the legitimate Khosrau II back on the throne and married his daughter to him. Maurice's treaty with his new brother-in-law enlarged the territories of the Empire to the East and allowed the energetic Emperor to focus on the Balkans. By 602 a series of successful Byzantine campaigns had pushed the Avars and Slavs back across the Danube.

== Heraclian dynasty and shrinking borders ==
After Maurice's murder by Phocas, Khosrau used the pretext to reconquer the Roman province of Mesopotamia. Phocas, an unpopular ruler who is invariably described in Byzantine sources as a "tyrant", was the target of a number of senate-led plots. He was eventually deposed in 610 by Heraclius, who sailed to Constantinople from Carthage with an icon affixed to the prow of his ship. Following the ascension of Heraclius, the Sassanid advance pushed deep into Asia Minor, also occupying Damascus and Jerusalem and removing the True Cross to Ctesiphon. The counter-offensive of Heraclius took on the character of a holy war, and an acheiropoietos image of Christ was carried as a military standard. Similarly, when Constantinople was saved from an Avar siege in 626, the victory was attributed to the icons of the Virgin which were led in procession by Patriarch Sergius about the walls of the city. The main Sassanid force was destroyed at Nineveh in 627, and in 629 Heraclius restored the True Cross to Jerusalem in a majestic ceremony. The war had exhausted both the Byzantine and Sassanid Empire, and left them extremely vulnerable to the Arab forces which emerged in the following years. The Byzantines suffered a crushing defeat at the Battle of Yarmuk in 636, and Ctesiphon fell in 634.

In an attempt to heal the doctrinal divide between Chalcedonian and monophysite Christians, Heraclius proposed monotheletism as a compromise. In 638 the new doctrine was posted in the narthex of Hagia Sophia as part of a text called the Ekthesis, which also forbade further discussion of the issue. By this time, however, Syria and Palestine, both hotbeds of monophysite belief, had fallen to the Arabs, and another monophysite center, Egypt, fell by 642. Ambivalence toward Byzantine rule on the part of monophysites may have lessened local resistance to the Arab expansion.

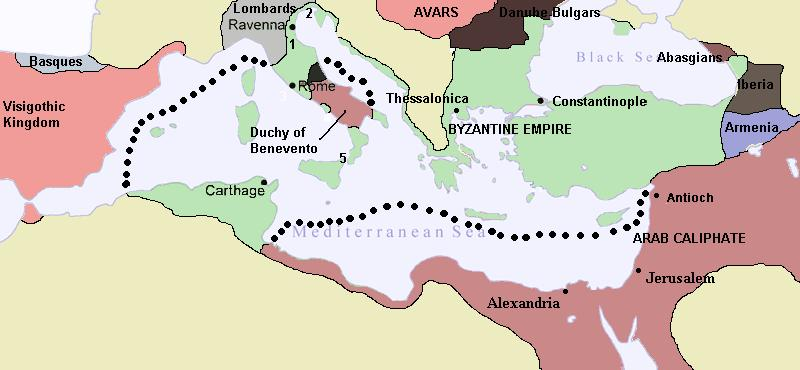
Byzantine Empire in 650, having lost all of its southern provinces except the Exarchate of Carthage.

Heraclius did succeed in establishing a dynasty, and his descendants held onto the throne, with some interruption, until 711. Their reigns were marked both by major external threats, from the west and the east, which reduced the territory of the empire to a fraction of its 6th-century extent, and by significant internal turmoil and cultural transformation.

The Arabs, now firmly in control of Syria and the Levant, sent frequent raiding parties deep into Asia Minor, and in 674–678 laid siege to Constantinople itself. The Arab fleet was finally repulsed through the use of Greek fire, and a thirty-years' truce was signed between the Empire and the Umayyad Caliphate. However, the Anatolian raids continued unabated, and accelerated the demise of classical urban culture, with the inhabitants of many cities either refortifying much smaller areas within the old city walls, or relocating entirely to nearby fortresses. Constantinople itself dropped substantially in size, from 500,000 inhabitants to just 40,000–70,000, and, like other urban centers, it was partly ruralised. The city also lost the free grain shipments in 618, after Egypt fell first to the Persians and then to the Arabs, and public wheat distribution ceased. The void left by the disappearance of the old semi-autonomous civic institutions was filled by the theme system, which entailed the division of Asia Minor into "provinces" occupied by distinct armies which assumed civil authority and answered directly to the imperial administration. This system may have had its roots in certain ad hoc measures taken by Heraclius, but over the course of the 7th century it developed into an entirely new system of imperial governance.

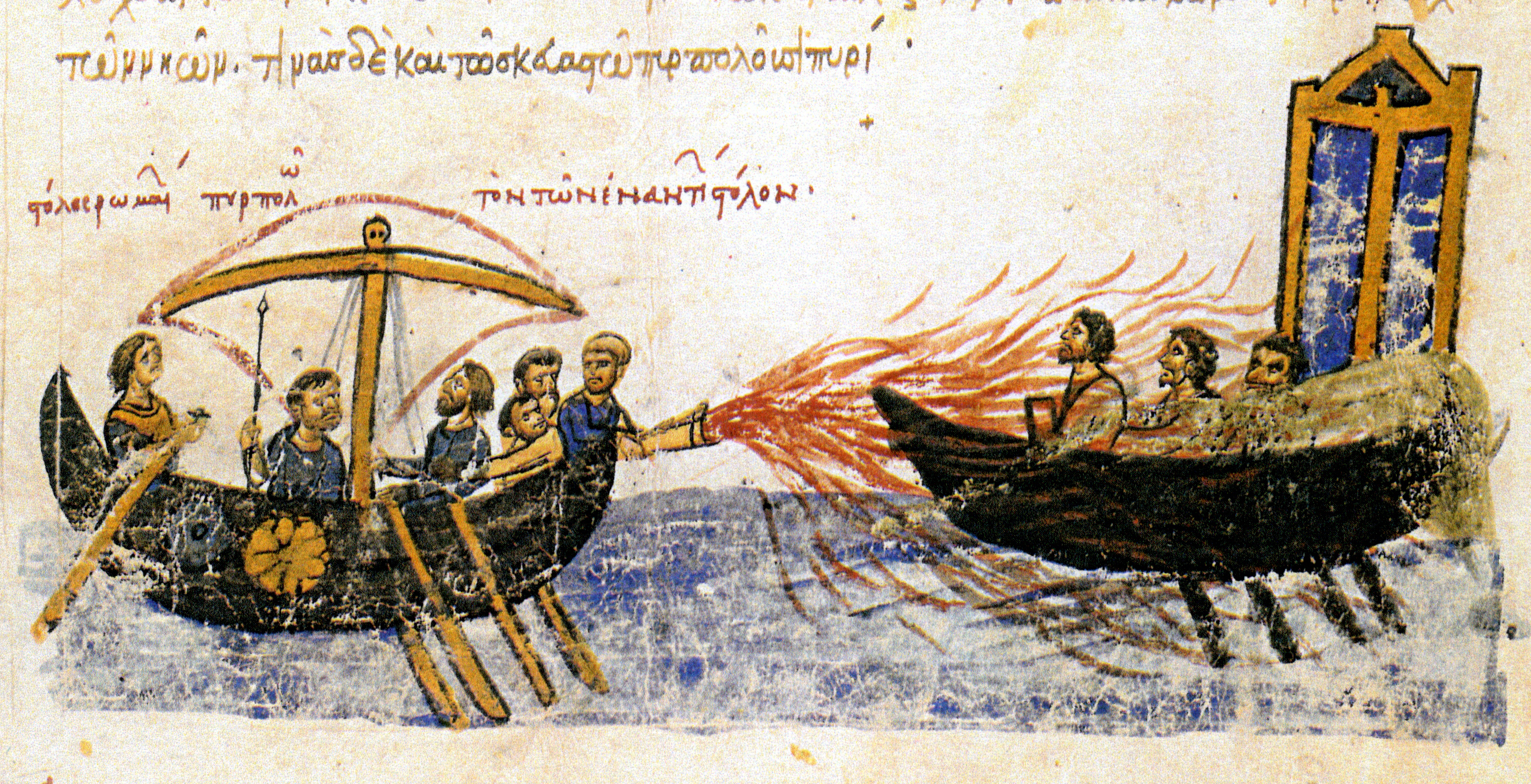
Greek fire was first used by the Byzantine Navy during the Byzantine-Arab Wars (from the Madrid Skylitzes, Biblioteca Nacional de España, Madrid).

The withdrawal of massive numbers of troops from the Balkans to combat the Persians and then the Arabs in the east opened the door for the gradual southward expansion of Slavic peoples into the peninsula, and, as in Anatolia, many cities shrank to small fortified settlements. In the 670s the Bulgars were pushed south of the Danube by the arrival of the Khazars, and in 680 Byzantine forces which had been sent to disperse these new settlements were defeated. In the next year Constantine IV signed a treaty with the Bulgar khan Asparukh, and the new Bulgarian state assumed sovereignty over a number of Slavic tribes which had previously, at least in name, recognized Byzantine rule. In 687–688, the emperor Justinian II led an expedition against the Slavs and Bulgars which made significant gains, although the fact that he had to fight his way from Thrace to Macedonia demonstrates the degree to which Byzantine power in the north Balkans had declined.

The one Byzantine city that remained relatively unaffected, despite a significant drop in population and at least two outbreaks of the plague, was Constantinople. However, the imperial capital was marked by its own variety of conflict, both political and religious. Constans II continued the monothelite policy of his grandfather, Heraclius, meeting with significant opposition from laity and clergy alike. The most vocal opponents, Maximus the Confessor and Pope Martin I were arrested, brought to Constantinople, tried, tortured, and exiled. Constans seems to have become immensely unpopular in the capital, and moved his residence to Syracuse, Sicily, where he was ultimately murdered by a member of his court. The Senate experienced a revival in importance in the seventh century and clashed with the emperors on numerous occasions. The final Heraclian emperor, Justinian II, attempted to break the power of the urban aristocracy through severe taxation and the appointment of "outsiders" to administrative posts. He was driven from power in 695, and took shelter first with the Khazars and then with the Bulgars. In 705 he returned to Constantinople with the armies of the Bulgar khan Tervel, retook the throne, and instituted a reign of terror against his enemies. With his final overthrow in 711, supported once more by the urban aristocracy, the Heraclian dynasty came to an end.

The 7th century was a period of radical transformation. The empire which had once stretched from Spain to Jerusalem was now reduced to Anatolia, Chersonesos, and some fragments of Italy and the Balkans. The territorial losses were accompanied by a cultural shift; urban civilization was massively disrupted, classical literary genres were abandoned in favor of theological treatises, and a new "radically abstract" style emerged in the visual arts. That the empire survived this period at all is somewhat surprising, especially given the total collapse of the Sassanid Empire in the face of the Arab expansion, but a remarkably coherent military reorganization helped to withstand the exterior pressures and laid the groundwork for the gains of the following dynasty. However, the massive cultural and institutional restructuring of the Empire consequent on the loss of territory in the seventh century has been said to have caused a decisive break in east Mediterranean Romanness and that the Byzantine state is subsequently best understood as another successor state rather than a real continuation of the Roman Empire.

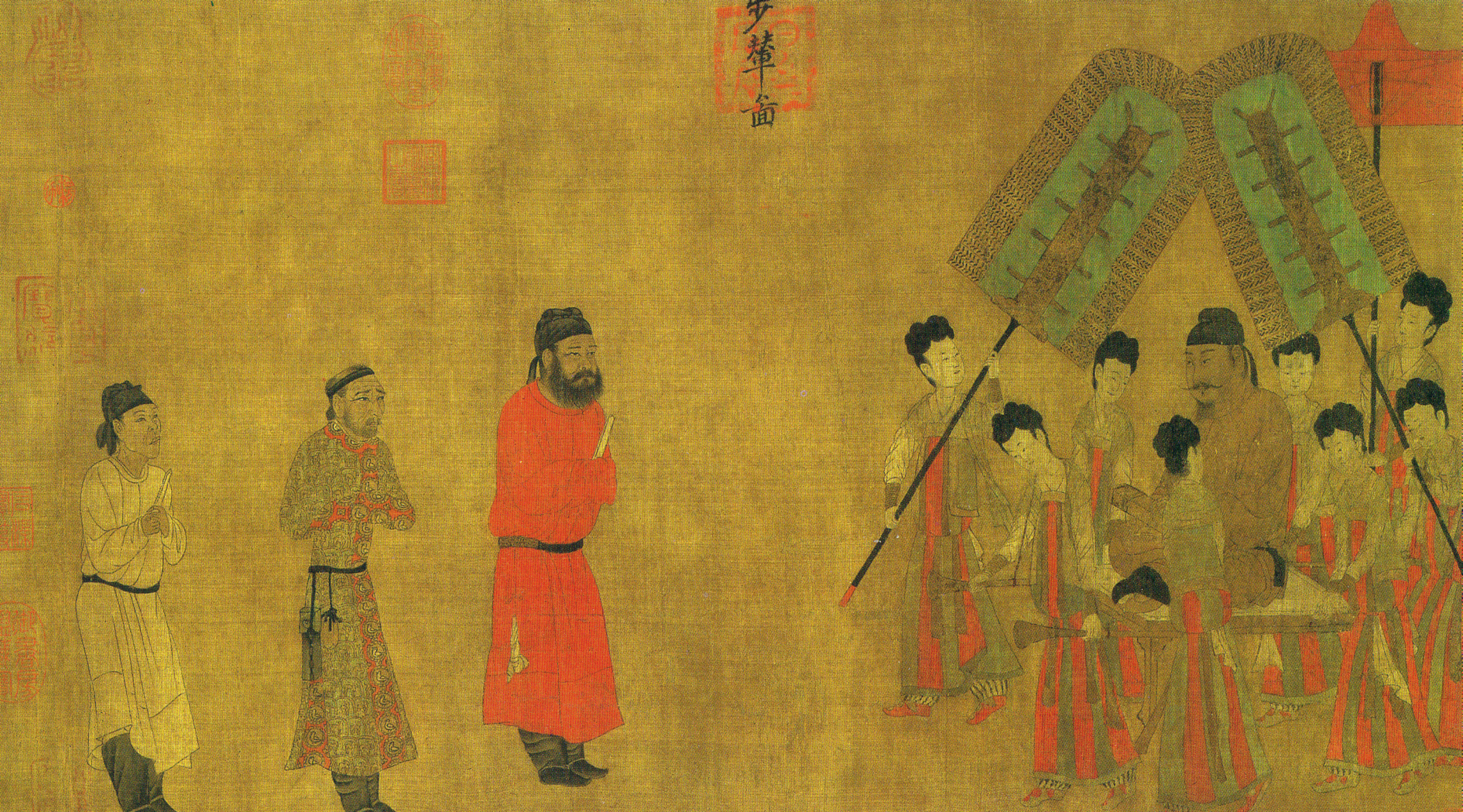
Emperor Taizong of Tang (r. 626–649) giving an audience to Gar Tongtsen Yulsung, ambassador of the Tibetan Empire, in a painting by Tang Chinese court artist Yan Liben (600–673 AD)

There also seem to have been interactions between the Byzantine realm and China at this time. Byzantine Greek historian Procopius stated that two Nestorian Christian monks eventually uncovered how silk was made. From this revelation monks were sent by Justinian I as spies on the Silk Road from Constantinople to China and back to steal the silkworm eggs. This resulted in silk production in the Mediterranean, particularly in Thrace, in northern Greece, and giving the Byzantine Empire a monopoly on silk production in medieval Europe until the loss of its territories in Southern Italy. The Byzantine historian Theophylact Simocatta, writing during the reign of Heraclius (r. 610–641), relayed information about China's geography, its capital city Khubdan (Old Turkic: Khumdan, i.e. Chang'an), its current ruler Taisson whose name meant "Son of God" (Chinese: Tianzi, although this could be derived from the name of Emperor Taizong of Tang), and correctly pointed to its reunification by the Sui dynasty (581–618) as occurring during the reign of Maurice, noting that China had previously been divided politically along the Yangzi River by two warring nations. This seems to match the conquest of the Chen dynasty in southern China by Emperor Wen of Sui (r. 581–604). The Chinese Old Book of Tang and New Book of Tang mention several embassies made by Fu lin (拂菻; i.e. Byzantium), which they equated with Daqin (i.e. the Roman Empire), beginning in 643 with an embassy sent by the king Boduoli (波多力, i.e. Constans II Pogonatos) to Emperor Taizong of Tang, bearing gifts such as red glass. These histories also provided cursory descriptions of Constantinople, its walls, and how it was besieged by Da shi (大食; the Arabs of the Umayyad Caliphate) and their commander "Mo-yi" (摩拽伐之; i.e. Muawiyah I, governor of Syria before becoming caliph), who forced them to pay tribute. Henry Yule highlights the fact that Yazdegerd III (r. 632–651), last ruler of the Sasanian Empire, sent diplomats to China for securing aid from Emperor Taizong (considered the suzerain over Ferghana in Central Asia) during the loss of the Persian heartland to the Islamic Rashidun Caliphate, which may have also prompted the Byzantines to send envoys to China amid their recent loss of Syria to the Muslims. Tang Chinese sources also recorded how Sassanid prince Peroz III (636–679) fled to Tang China following the conquest of Persia by the growing Islamic caliphate. Other Byzantine embassies in Tang China are recorded as arriving in 711, 719, and 742. From Chinese records it is known that Michael VII Doukas (Mie li sha ling kai sa 滅力沙靈改撒) of Fu lin dispatched a diplomatic mission to China's Song dynasty that arrived in 1081, during the reign of Emperor Shenzong of Song.

== The period of internal instability ==
The Twenty Years' Anarchy was a period of extreme political instability in the Byzantine Empire. It began following the deposition of Justinian II, whose despotic rule made him very unpopular. Justinian was exiled to Cherson and was replaced by Leontius. Although Leontius was initially popular, the defeat of the Byzantine forces and the subsequent loss of Carthage made him unpopular. Fearing punishment, the army sent to Carthage helped Tiberius III depose Leontius and gain the throne. Meanwhile, Justinian II decided to forge an alliance with the Bulgars and he recaptured Constantinople and executed Tiberius. Justinian also proceeded to execute many of Tiberius' supporters and his second reign turned out to be more despotic than his first. He was overthrown and executed by Philippicus, who reigned for two years before being deposed by Anastasius II. However, the army soon proclaimed Theodosius III and Anastasius fled the capital. Theodosius resigned not long after and was replaced by Leo III.

== Isaurian dynasty and Iconoclasm ==
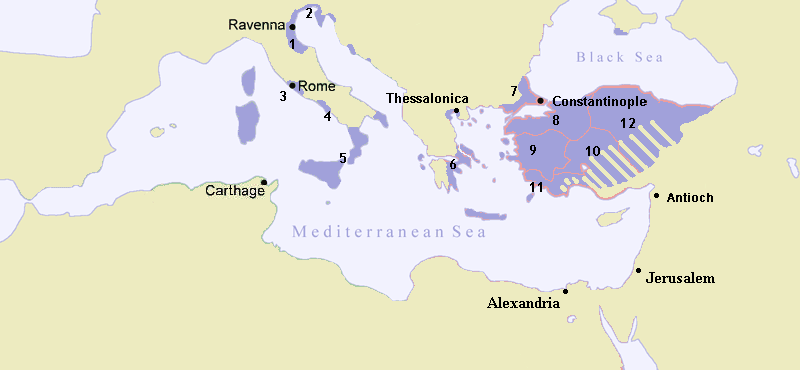
The Byzantine Empire at the accession of Leo III, c. 717. Striped area indicates land raided by the Arabs.

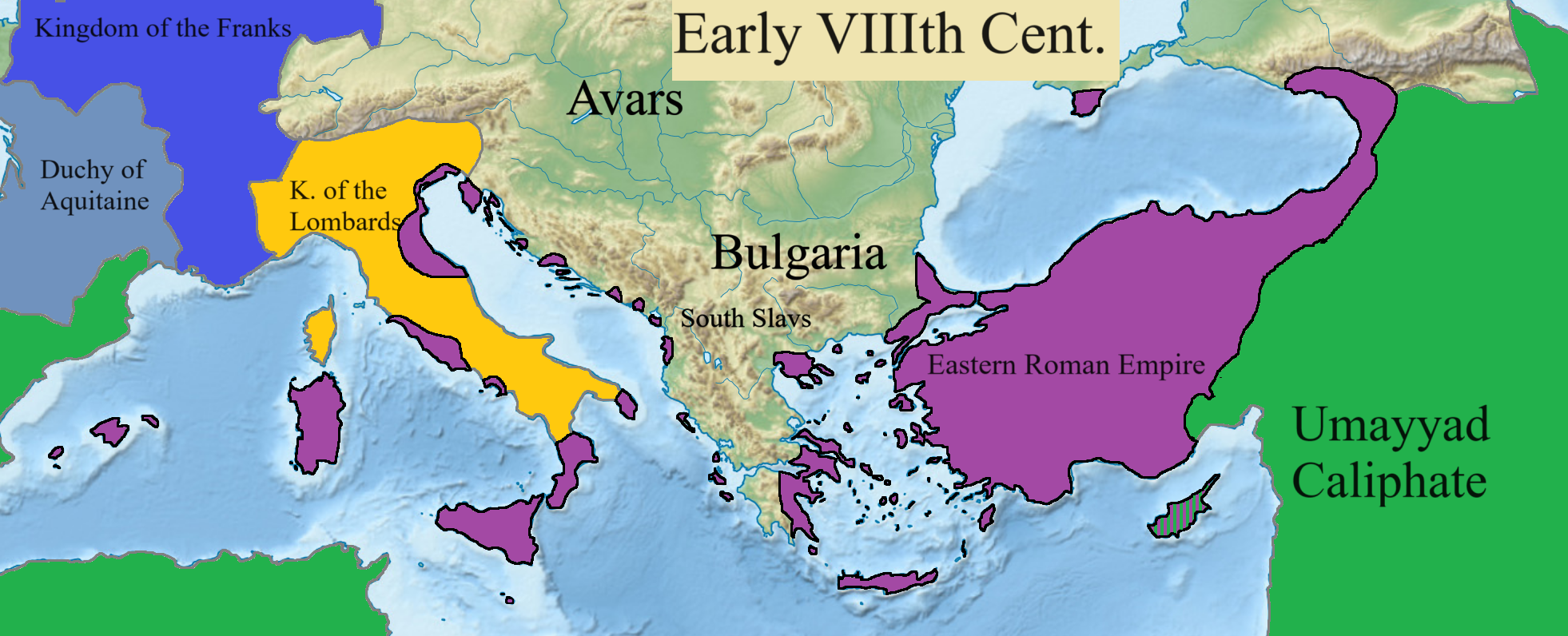
Map of southern Europe at the beginning of the reign of Leo the Isaurian (717-741)

Leo III the Isaurian (717–741 AD) turned back the Muslim assault in 718, and achieved victory with the major help of the Bulgarian khan Tervel, who killed 32,000 Arabs with his army in 740 in Akroinon. Raids by the Arabs against Byzantium would plague the Empire all during the reign of Leo III. However, the threat against the Empire from the Arabs would never again be as great as it was during this first attack of Leo's reign. In just over twelve years, Leo the Isaurian had raised himself from being a mere Syrian peasant to being the Emperor of Byzantium. Now, Leo set about the task of reorganizing and consolidating the themes in Asia Minor. Additionally, in 726 AD, Leo III, ordered the removal of the great golden icon of Christ that decorated the Chalke Gate or vestibule to the Great Palace of Byzantium. "Chalke" means bronze in the Greek language and the Chalke Gate derived its name from the great bronze doors that formed the ceremonial entrance to the Great Palace.

Built in reign of Anastasius I (491–518 AD), the Chalke Gates were meant to celebrate the Byzantium victory in the Isaurian War of 492–497 AD. The Chalke Gates had been destroyed in the Nika riots of 532 AD. When the gates were rebuilt again by Justinian I (527–565 AD) and his wife Theodora, a large golden statue of Christ was positioned over the doors. At the beginning of the eighth century, there arose a feeling among some people of Byzantine Empire that the popular reverence for religious statues and religious paintings had become more than simple admiration, and that these icons had become objects of idolatry, interfering with the true goal of worship. Thus, an "iconoclast" movement arose which sought to "cleanse" the church by destroying all religious icons. The primary icon of all Byzantium was the golden Christ over the Chalke Gates. Iconoclasm was more popular amongst the people of Anatolia and the Levant than in the European portion of the Byzantine Empire. Although Leo III was Syrian, there is no evidence that he was given to tendencies toward iconoclasm. Leo's order to remove the golden Christ over the Chalke Gates and to have it replaced with a simple cross was motivated by the need to mollify the rising tide of popular objection to all religious icons. In 730 AD, Leo III issued an edict which made iconoclasm official policy throughout the Empire. Thus, the destruction of the golden Christ over the Chalke Gates in 726 AD marks the beginning of the period known as the "first iconoclast period." Iconoclasm would remain a strong trend throughout the reigns of Leo III's successors, particularly his son Constantine V. Indeed, Constantine V's iconoclastic policies caused a revolt led by the iconodule Artabasdus in 742 AD. Artabasdus (742 AD) actually overthrew Constantine V and ruled as Emperor for a few months before Constantine V was restored to power.

Leo III's son, Constantine V (741–775 AD), won noteworthy victories in northern Syria, and also thoroughly undermined Bulgar strength during his reign. However, it would also be under his reign that the Byzantine Empire would loose the Exarchate of Ravenna, ending Western continuation. Like his father, Constantine V, Leo IV (775–780 AD) was an iconoclast. However, Leo IV was dominated by his wife Irene who tended toward iconodulism, and supported religious statues and images. Upon the death of Leo IV in 780 AD, his 10-year-old son, Constantine VI (780–797 AD) succeeded to the Byzantine throne under the regency of his mother, Irene. However, before Constantine VI could come of age and rule in his own right, his mother usurped the throne for herself. Irene (797–802 AD) reinstated a policy of iconodulism, and in 787 AD, at the Council of Nicaea, iconodulism was made official church policy, thus revoking Leo III's official policy of 730 AD. Accordingly, the period of time called the "first iconoclasm", dating from 726 AD through 787, came to an end. An intervening period of iconodulism was initiated which would last through the reigns of Irene and her successors, Nikephoros I (802–811 AD); Staurakios (811 AD) and Michael I Rhangabe (811–813 AD).

In the beginning of the 9th century the Arabs captured Crete, and successfully attacked Sicily, but on 3 September 863, general Petronas attained a huge victory against the emir of Melitene. Under the leadership of Krum, the Bulgar threat also reemerged, but in 814 Krum's son, Omortag, arranged a peace with the Byzantine Empire.

As noted above, the 8th and 9th centuries were also dominated by controversy and religious division over Iconoclasm. Also as noted above, Icons were banned by Leo and Constantine, leading to revolts by iconodules (supporters of icons) throughout the empire. After the efforts of Empress Irene, the Second Council of Nicaea met in 787, and affirmed that icons could be venerated but not worshiped.

Irene made determined efforts to stamp out iconoclasm everywhere in the Empire including within the ranks of the army. During Irene's reign, the Arabs were continuing to raid into and despoil the small farms of the Anatolian section of the Empire. The small farmers of Anatolia owed a military obligation to the Byzantine throne. Indeed, the Byzantine army and the defense of the Empire was largely based on this obligation and the Anatolian farmers. The iconodule policy drove these farmers out of the army and thus off their farms. Thus, the army was weakened and was unable to protect Anatolia from the Arab raids. Many of the remaining farmers of Anatolia were driven from the farm to settle in the city of Byzantium, thereby further reducing the army's ability to raise soldiers. Additionally, the abandoned farms fell from the tax rolls, and reduced the amount of income that government received. These farms were taken over by the largest land owner in the Byzantine Empire—the monasteries. To make the situation even worse, Irene had exempted all monasteries from all taxation.

Given the financial ruin into which the Empire was headed, it was no wonder that Irene was eventually deposed by her own Logothete of the Treasury. The leader of this successful revolt against Irene replaced her on the Byzantine throne under the name Nicephorus I.

Nicephorus I (802–811 AD) was of Arab extraction. Although he moved immediately to set the Byzantine economy on a better financial footing by countermanding Irene's tax exemptions and to strengthen the army, by drafting the destitute small land holders, Nicephorus I, nonetheless, continued Irene's iconodule policy. Nicephorus I was killed in 811 AD, while battling the Bulgars under their King Krum. Nicephorous' son and successor to the throne, Stauracius (811 AD), was severely wounded in the same battle. Stauracius died just six months after the battle. Nicephorus I's daughter, Procopia, was married to Michael Rhangabe, who now became Emperor as Michael I.

Irene is said to have endeavored to negotiate a marriage between herself and Charlemagne, but, according to Theophanes the Confessor, the scheme was frustrated by Aetios, one of her favourites. During the reign of Michael I (811–813 AD) foreign policy initiatives involving Charlemagne, again, took front stage. Since being crowned by Pope Leo III as Emperor on Christmas Day, 800 AD in Rome, Charlemagne had been laying claims to the Eastern Empire. Nicephorus I had refused to recognise Charlemagne's position, and had merely ignored these claims by Charlemagne. This inflexible policy by Nicephorus I had resulted in a naval war with Franks which indirectly led to the official separation of the city of Venice from the Byzantine Empire. (In fact, Venice had been acting under a "de facto" independence since 727 AD. This de facto independence was recognised by the Pax Nicephori of 802 AD. Nonetheless, despite this de facto independence, Venice had officially remained a part of the Byzantine Empire until 811 AD.)

The threat posed by the Bulgars under their King Krum, which had become very evident in the crisis of 811 AD, forced Michael I to reverse the policy of non-recognition of Charlemagne. As noted above, Nicephorus I had died in battle in 811 AD and his son, Stauracious, had been severely wounded in the same battle and died a short time later in 811 AD. The Bulgar threat required Michael I to reverse Nicephorus' policy and recognise Charlemagne and open peace negotiations with him in order to avoid war with both the Franks under Charlemagne and with the Bulgars at the same time. This reversal of policy and the agreement reached with Charlemagne had long range implications. Under the terms of the treaty between Charlemagne and the Byzantine Empire, Charlemagne received recognition of his imperial title to the lands he held in the west and, in exchange, Charlemagne dropped all his claims to the throne or any part of the Byzantine Empire. This treaty of 811 AD was a watershed. Until this date, despite the centuries of separation, there had always remained the forlorn hope that the two parts of the old Roman Empire might eventually be reconciled. From 811 AD on this hope was finally given up. There was no longer any hope or idea of merging the two parts of the old Roman Empire.

Michael I had been forced into this treaty with Charlemagne because of the Bulgar threat. His failure to achieve success against the Bulgar would cause a revolt against him which would end his reign in 813 AD. The military would rise up against Michael I. The leader of this revolt was the Armenian commander of the army who would take the throne under the name of Leo V.

== Amorian (Phrygian) dynasty ==
In 813 Leo V the Armenian (813–820 AD) restored the policy of iconoclasm. This started the period of history called the "Second Iconclasm" which would last from 813 until 842 AD. Only in 843 would Empress Theodora restore the veneration of the icons with the help of Patriarch Methodios. Iconoclasm played its part in the further alienation of East from West, which worsened during the so-called Photian Schism, when Pope Nicholas I challenged Photios' elevation to the patriarchate.

However, iconoclasm may have been influential in the rise of feudalism in the Byzantine Empire. Feudalism is characterized and, indeed, defined as the decline of central governmental power as power is handed over to private, local, large landholders. In any given locality these private individuals become the new governmental power over the common people working and living in the area. The private land holders owe only a duty of military service to the central government when they are called upon by the central authority. This duty is called patronage and in exchange for the patronage, the land holders are granted immunity in their rule over the locality. Ever since the reign of Emperor Severus Alexander (222–235 AD), lands on the frontiers of the Roman Empire which had been taken from enemies, were granted to Roman soldiers and their heirs on the condition that the duty for military service to the Emperor would also be hereditary and on the condition that the lands would never be sold, but would remain in the family. This practice was the ancestor of feudalism in the Byzantine Empire. With the advent of iconoclasm, many monasteries were despoiled and church lands were seized by the Emperor. These lands were handed over to private individuals. Patronage for these individuals was once again the duty of military service to the Emperor. As noted above, some of these lands were restored to the monasteries under Empress Irene. However, feudalism had really been allowed to take root by the private control of these monastery lands.

== Macedonian dynasty and resurgence ==
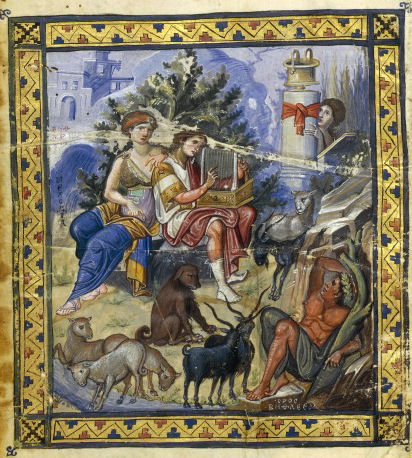
The military successes of the 10th century were coupled with a major cultural revival, known as the Macedonian Renaissance. Miniature from the Paris Psalter, an example of Hellenistic-influenced art and evidence of enduring artistic traditions reaching the Antiquity.

The Byzantine Empire reached its height under the Macedonian emperors (of Armenian origins) of the late 9th, 10th, and early 11th centuries, when it gained control over the Adriatic Sea, southern Italy, and all of the territory of tsar Samuel of Bulgaria. The cities of the empire expanded, and affluence spread across the provinces because of the new-found security. The population rose, and production increased, stimulating new demand while also helping to encourage trade. Culturally, there was considerable growth in education and learning. Ancient texts were preserved and patiently re-copied. Byzantine art flourished, and brilliant mosaics graced the interiors of the many new churches. Though the empire was significantly smaller than during the reign of Justinian, it could be argued that it was stronger, as the remaining territories were less geographically dispersed and more politically and culturally integrated.

=== Internal developments ===
Although traditionally attributed to Basil I (867–886 AD), initiator of the Macedonian dynasty, the Macedonian Renaissance has been more recently ascribed to the reforms of his predecessor, Michael III (842–867 AD) and his wife's counsellor, the erudite Theoktistos. The latter in particular favoured culture at the court, and, with a careful financial policy, steadily increased the gold reserves of the Empire. The rise of the Macedonian dynasty coincided with internal developments which strengthened the religious unity of the empire. The iconoclast movement was experiencing a steep decline: this favoured its soft suppression by the emperors and the reconciliation of the religious strife that had drained the imperial resources in the previous centuries. Despite occasional tactical defeats, the administrative, legislative, cultural and economic situation continued to improve under Basil's successors, especially with Romanos I Lekapenos (920–944 AD). The theme system reached its definitive form in this period. Once the government was safely back in iconodule hands and the monastery lands and privileges were restored again, the church establishment, once again, became a strong loyal supporter of the imperial cause. Most of the Macedonian emperors (867–1056 AD) were opposed to the interests of the aristocracy. They created much legislation to protect and favour of small agricultural landholders as opposed to the aristocracy. Prior to the Macedonian emperors, the large landholders had made up a controlling force in the society and owned most of the farm land. Since owners of the land owed military obligations to the Byzantine throne, large numbers of small landholders created larger armies than did small numbers of large land holders. Thus support for the small landholders created a stronger military force for the Empire. These favourable policies of the Macedonian emperors contributed to the increasing ability of the emperors to wage war against the Arabs.

=== Wars against the Muslims ===
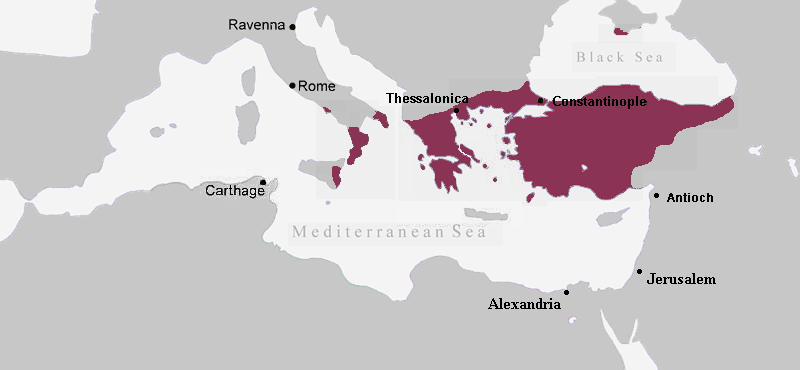
The Byzantine Empire, c. 867

By 867, the empire had re-stabilised its position in both the east and the west, and the efficiency of its defensive military structure enabled its emperors to begin planning wars of reconquest in the east. The process of reconquest began with variable fortunes. The temporary reconquest of Crete (843 AD) was followed by a crushing Byzantine defeat on the Bosporus, while the emperors were unable to prevent the ongoing Muslim conquest of Sicily (827–902 AD). Using present day Tunisia as their launching pad, the Muslims conquered Palermo in 831 AD, Messina in 842 AD, Enna in 859 AD, Syracuse in 878 AD, Catania in 900 AD and the final Byzantine stronghold, the fortress of Taormina, in 902 AD.

These drawbacks were later counterbalanced by a victorious expedition against Damietta in Egypt (856), the defeat of the Emir of Melitene (863), the confirmation of the imperial authority over Dalmatia (867), and Basil I's offensives towards the Euphrates (870s). Unlike the deteriorating situation in Sicily, Basil I handled the situation in southern Italy well enough and the province would remain in Byzantine hands for the next 200 years.

In the early years of Basil I's reign, Arab raids on the coasts of Dalmatia were successfully repelled, and the region once again came under secure Byzantine control. This enabled Byzantine missionaries to penetrate to the interior and convert the Serbs and the principalities of modern-day Herzegovina and Montenegro to Orthodox Christianity. The attempt to retake Malta ended disastrously, however, when the local population sided with the Arabs and massacred the Byzantine garrison. By contrast, the Byzantine position in Southern Italy was gradually consolidated so that by 873 Bari had once again come under Byzantine rule, and most of Southern Italy would remain in the Empire for the next 200 years. On the more important eastern front, the Empire rebuilt its defenses and went on the offensive. The Paulicians were defeated and their capital of Tephrike (Divrigi) taken, while the offensive against the Abbasid Caliphate began with the recapture of Samosata.

Under Michael's son and successor, Leo VI the Wise, the gains in the east against the now weak Abbasid Caliphate continued. However, Sicily was lost to the Arabs in 902, and in 904 Thessaloniki, the Empire's second city, was sacked by an Arab fleet. The weakness of the Empire in the naval sphere was quickly rectified so that a few years later a Byzantine fleet had re-occupied Cyprus, lost in the 7th century, and also stormed Laodicea in Syria. Despite this revenge, the Byzantines were still unable to strike a decisive blow against the Muslims, who inflicted a crushing defeat on the imperial forces when they attempted to regain Crete in 911.

The death of the Bulgarian tsar Simeon I in 927 severely weakened the Bulgarians, allowing the Byzantines to concentrate on the eastern front. The situation on the border with the Arab territories remained fluid, with the Byzantines alternatively on the offensive or defensive. The Varangians (later known as the Russians), who attacked Constantinople for the first time in 860, constituted another new challenge. In 941 the Russians appeared on the Asian shore of the Bosporus, but this time they were crushed, showing the improvements in the Byzantine military position after 907, when only diplomacy had been able to push back the invaders. The vanquisher of the Varangians/Russians was the famous general John Kourkouas, who continued the offensive with other noteworthy victories in Mesopotamia (943). These Byzantine victories culminated in the reconquest of Edessa (944), which was especially celebrated for the return to Constantinople of the venerated Mandylion, a relic purportedly imprinted with a portrait of Jesus.

The soldier-emperors Nikephoros II Phokas (reigned 963–969 AD) and John I Tzimiskes (969–976 AD) expanded the empire well into Syria, defeating the emirs of north-west Iraq and reconquering Crete and Cyprus. At one point under John, the empire's armies even threatened Jerusalem, far to the south. The emirate of Aleppo and its neighbours became vassals of the empire in the east, where the greatest threat to the empire was Caliph Hakim of the Fatimid caliphate. After much campaigning, the last Arab threat to Byzantium was defeated when Basil II rapidly drew 40,000 mounted soldiers to relieve Roman Syria. With a surplus of resources and victories thanks to the Bulgar and Syrian campaigns, Basil II planned an expedition against Sicily to re-take it from the Arabs there. After his death in 1025, the expedition set off in the 1040s and was met with initial, but stunted success.

=== Wars against the Bulgarians ===
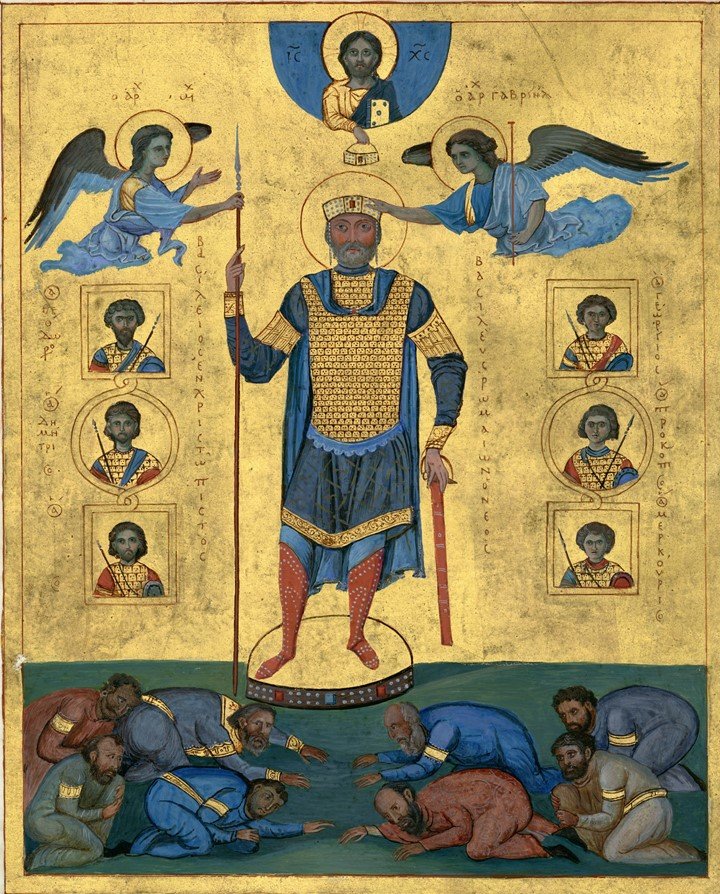
Emperor Basil II the Bulgar Slayer (976–1025)

The traditional struggle with the See of Rome continued through the Macedonian period, spurred by the question of religious supremacy over the newly Christianised state of Bulgaria. Ending 80 years of peace between the two states, the powerful Bulgarian tsar Simeon I invaded in 894 but was pushed back by the Byzantines, who used their fleet to sail up the Black Sea to attack the Bulgarian rear, enlisting the support of the Hungarians. The Byzantines were defeated at the Battle of Boulgarophygon in 896, however, and agreed to pay annual subsidies to the Bulgarians.

Leo the Wise died in 912, and hostilities soon resumed as Simeon marched to Constantinople at the head of a large army. Though the walls of the city were impregnable, the Byzantine administration was in disarray and Simeon was invited into the city, where he was granted the crown of basileus (emperor) of Bulgaria and had the young emperor Constantine VII marry one of his daughters. When a revolt in Constantinople halted his dynastic project, he again invaded Thrace and conquered Adrianople. The Empire now faced the problem of a powerful Christian state within a few days' marching distance from Constantinople, as well as having to fight on two fronts.

A great imperial expedition under Leo Phocas and Romanos I Lekapenos ended with another crushing Byzantine defeat at the Battle of Achelous in 917, and the following year the Bulgarians were free to ravage northern Greece. Adrianople was plundered again in 923, and a Bulgarian army laid siege to Constantinople in 924. Simeon died suddenly in 927, however, and Bulgarian power collapsed with him. Bulgaria and Byzantium entered a long period of peaceful relations, and the Empire was now free to concentrate on the eastern front against the Muslims. In 968, Bulgaria was overrun by the Rus' under Sviatoslav I of Kiev, but three years later, John I Tzimiskes defeated the Rus' and re-incorporated Eastern Bulgaria into the Byzantine Empire.

The Empire under Basil II

Bulgarian resistance revived under the leadership of the Cometopuli dynasty, but the new emperor Basil II (reigned 976–1025 AD) made the submission of the Bulgarians his primary goal. Basil's first expedition against Bulgaria however resulted in a humiliating defeat at the Gates of Trajan. For the next few years, the emperor would be preoccupied with internal revolts in Anatolia, while the Bulgarians expanded their realm in the Balkans. The war was to drag on for nearly twenty years. The Byzantine victories of Spercheios and Skopje decisively weakened the Bulgarian army, and in annual campaigns, Basil methodically reduced the Bulgarian strongholds. Eventually, at the Battle of Kleidion in 1014 the Bulgarians were completely defeated. The Bulgarian army was captured, and it is said that 99 out of every 100 men were blinded, with the remaining hundredth man left with one eye so as to lead his compatriots home. When Tsar Samuil saw the broken remains of his once gallant army, he died of shock. By 1018, the last Bulgarian strongholds had surrendered, and the country became part of the empire. This victory restored the Danube frontier, which had not been held since the reign of emperor Heraclius.

=== Relations with Kiev Rus ===
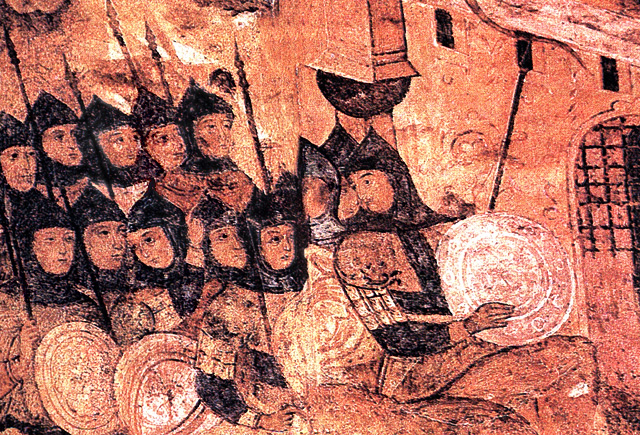
Rus' under the walls Constantinople (860)

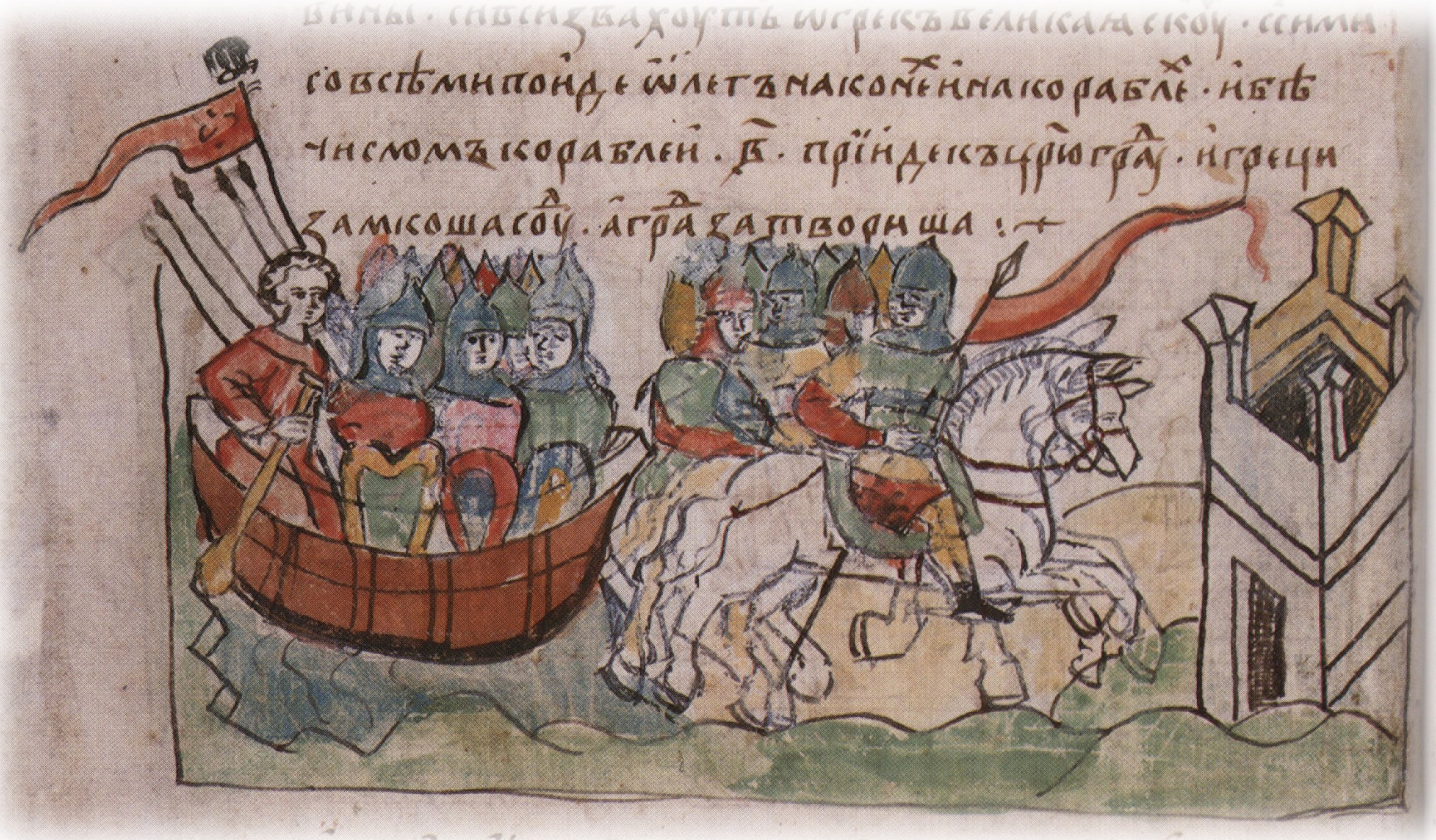
Prince Oleg leads a squadron of horse-driven boats to the walls of Tsargrad. A medieval Kiev Rus' illumination (907)

Between 850 and 1100 the Empire developed a mixed relationship with the new state of Kiev Rus that emerged to the north across the Black Sea. The Byzantine Empire quickly became a main trading and cultural partner for Kiev. After Christianizing Rus Vladimir the Great employed many architects and artists to work on numerous cathedrals and churches around Rus, expanding the Byzantine influence even further.

Kiev Princes were often married into the Byzantine imperial family and Constantinople often employed Princes' armies, most notably Vladimir the Great presented Byzantine with the famous Varangian Guard – an army of vicious Scandinavian mercenaries. Some believe that it was done in exchange for the marriage to Basil's sister, porphyrogenita Anna to Vladimir the Great. However, as Primary Chronicle states the marriage was in exchange for the Rus conversion to Orthodoxy, the creation of the Varangian Guard, although significant, was only a by-product of this exchange.

These relationships were not always friendly. During those three hundred years Constantinople and other Byzantine cities were attacked several times by the armies of Kiev Rus (see Rus'-Byzantine Wars). Kiev never went far enough to actually endanger the Empire, those wars were only a tool to force the Byzantine to sign increasingly favorable trade treaties, the texts of which are recorded in the Primary Chronicle, Rus'–Byzantine Treaty (907), and other historical documents. Constantinople at the same time constantly played Kiev Rus, Bulgaria, and Poland against each other.

The Byzantine influence on Kiev Rus cannot be underestimated. Byzantine-style writing became a standard for the Cyrillic alphabet, Byzantine architecture was dominating in Kiev, and as a main trading partner Byzantine played a critical role in the establishment, rise and fall of Kiev Rus.

=== The climax ===
The Roman Empire then stretched from Armenia in the east, to Calabria in Southern Italy in the west. Many successes had been achieved, ranging from the conquest of Bulgaria, to the annexation of parts of Georgia and Armenia, to the total annihilation of an invading force of Egyptians outside Antioch. Yet even these victories were not enough; Basil considered the continued Arab occupation of Sicily to be an outrage. Accordingly, he planned to reconquer the island, which had belonged to the empire for over 300 years (c536 – c. 900). However, his death in 1025 put an end to the project.

The themata of the Byzantine Empire at the death of Basil II in 1025. At this point, the Empire was the most powerful state in the Mediterranean.

Leo VI achieved the complete codification of Byzantine law in Greek. This monumental work of 60 volumes became the foundation of all subsequent Byzantine law and is still studied today. Leo also reformed the administration of the Empire, redrawing the borders of the administrative subdivisions (the Themata, or "Themes") and tidying up the system of ranks and privileges, as well as regulating the behavior of the various trade guilds in Constantinople. Leo's reform did much to reduce the previous fragmentation of the Empire, which henceforth had one center of power, Constantinople. However, the increasing military success of the Empire greatly enriched and empowered the provincial nobility with respect to the peasantry, who were essentially reduced to a state of serfdom.

Under the Macedonian emperors, the city of Constantinople flourished, becoming the largest and wealthiest city in Europe, with a population of approximately 400,000 in the 9th and 10th centuries. During this period, the Byzantine Empire employed a strong civil service staffed by competent aristocrats that oversaw the collection of taxes, domestic administration, and foreign policy. The Macedonian emperors also increased the Empire's wealth by fostering trade with Western Europe, particularly through the sale of silk and metalwork.

The 11th century was also momentous for its religious events. In 1054, relations between Greek-speaking Eastern and Latin-speaking Western traditions within the Christian Church reached a terminal crisis. Although there was a formal declaration of institutional separation, on 16 July, when three papal legates entered the Hagia Sophia during Divine Liturgy on a Saturday afternoon and placed a bull of excommunication on the altar, the so-called Great Schism was actually the culmination of centuries of gradual separation. Although the schism was brought about by doctrinal disputes (in particular, Eastern refusal to accept the Western Church doctrine of the filioque, or double procession of the Holy Spirit), disputes over administration and political issues had simmered for centuries. The formal separation of the Eastern Orthodox Church and the Western Catholic Church would have wide-ranging consequences for the future of Byzantium.

== Crisis and fragmentation ==
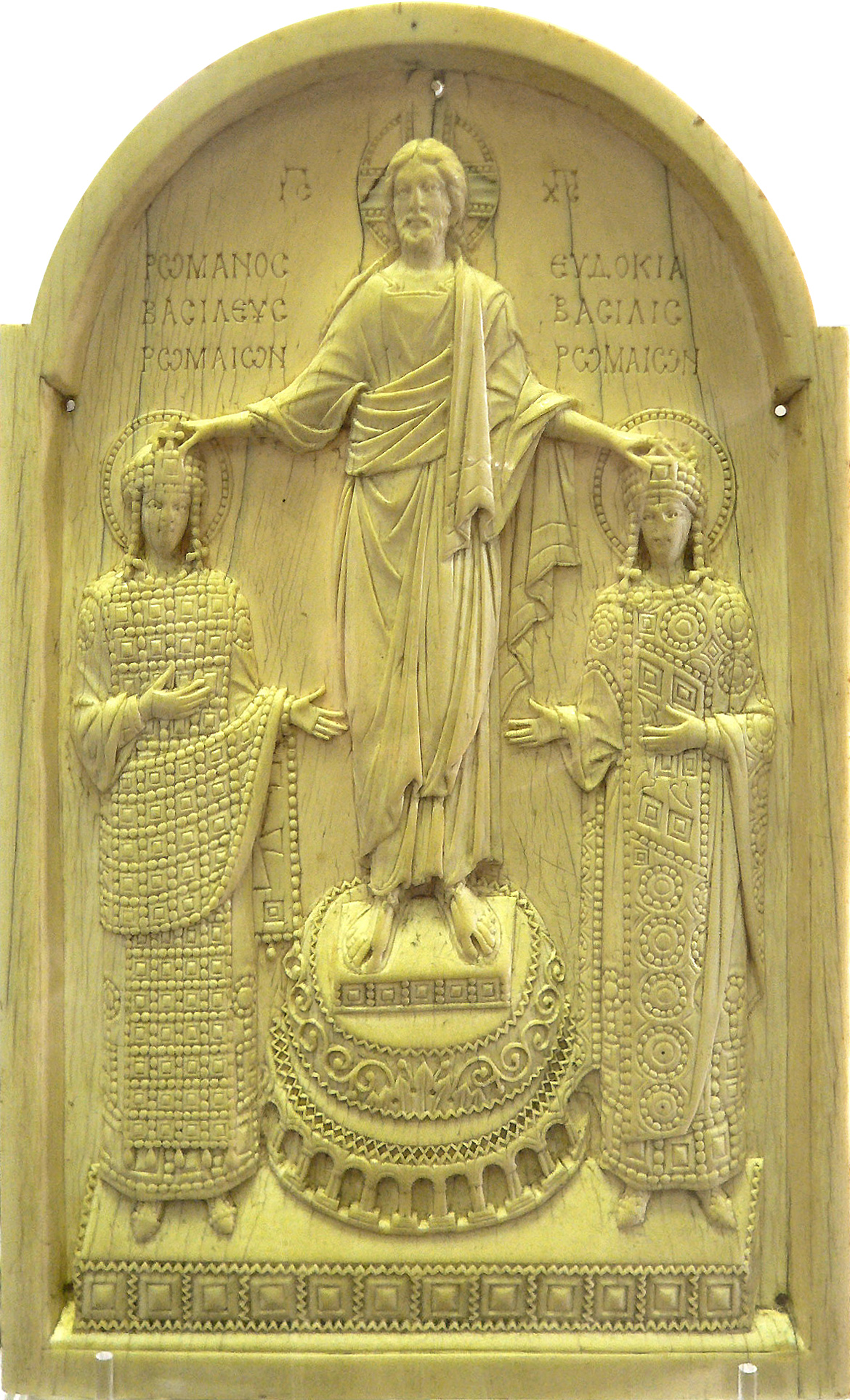
Diptych of Romanos and Eudocia Macrembolitissa crowned by Christ (Bibliothèque nationale de France, Paris).

Byzantium soon fell into a period of difficulties, caused to a large extent by the undermining of the theme system and the neglect of the military. Nikephoros II, John Tzimiskes and Basil II changed the military divisions (τάγματα, tagmata) from a rapid response, primarily defensive, citizen army into a professional, campaigning army increasingly manned by mercenaries. Mercenaries, however, were expensive and as the threat of invasion receded in the 10th century, so did the need for maintaining large garrisons and expensive fortifications. Basil II left a burgeoning treasury upon his death, but neglected to plan for his succession. None of his immediate successors had any particular military or political talent and the administration of the Empire increasingly fell into the hands of the civil service. Efforts to revive the Byzantine economy only resulted in inflation and a debased gold coinage. The army was now seen as both an unnecessary expense and a political threat. Therefore, native troops were cashiered and replaced by foreign mercenaries on specific contract.

Map of Italy on the eve of the arrival of the Normans

At the same time, the Empire was faced with new, ambitious enemies. Byzantine provinces in southern Italy faced the Normans, who arrived in Italy at the beginning of the 11th century. The allied forces of Melus of Bari and the Normans were defeated at the Battle of Cannae in 1018, and two decades later Michael IV the Paphlagonian equipped an expedition for the reconquest of Sicily from the Arabs. Although the campaign was initially successful, the reconquest of Sicily was not accomplished, mainly because George Maniaces, the commander of the Byzantine forces, was recalled when he was suspected of having ambitious schemes. During a period of strife between Constantinople and Rome which ended in the East–West Schism of 1054, the Normans began to advance, slowly but steadily, into Byzantine Italy.

It was in Asia Minor, however, that the greatest disaster would take place. The Seljuq Turks made their first explorations across the Byzantine frontier into Armenia in 1065 and in 1067. The emergency lent weight to the military aristocracy in Anatolia who, in 1068, secured the election of one of their own, Romanos Diogenes, as emperor. In the summer of 1071, Romanos undertook a massive eastern campaign to draw the Seljuks into a general engagement with the Byzantine army. At Manzikert Romanos not only suffered a surprise defeat at the hands of Sultan Alp Arslan, but was also captured. Alp Arslan treated him with respect, and imposed no harsh terms on the Byzantines. In Constantinople, however, a coup took place in favor of Michael Doukas, who soon faced the opposition of Nikephoros Bryennios and Nikephoros Botaneiates. By 1081 the Seljuks expanded their rule over virtually the entire Anatolian plateau from Armenia in the east to Bithynia in the west and founded their capital in Nicea.

In the meantime, the Byzantine presence in southern Italy had been wiped out by the Normans. Reggio, the capital of the tagma of Calabria, was captured by Robert Guiscard in 1060. At the time the Byzantines controlled only a few of coastal cities in Apulia. Otranto fell in 1068, the same year in which the siege of Bari (the capital of the catepanate of Italy) begun. After the Byzantines had been defeated in a series of battles, and any attempt to relief the city had failed, Bari was surrendered in April 1071. This event ended the Byzantine presence in southern Italy.

== Komnenian dynasty and the crusaders ==
=== Komnenian dynasty and the crusaders ===
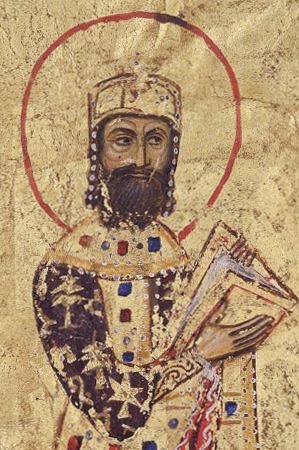
Alexios I, founder of the Komnenos dynasty.

During the Komnenian, or Comnenian, period from about 1081 to about 1185, the five emperors of the Komnenos dynasty (Alexios I, John II, Manuel I, Alexios II, and Andronikos I) presided over a sustained, though ultimately incomplete, restoration of the military, territorial, economic, and political position of the Byzantine Empire. Although the Seljuk Turks occupied the heartland of the Empire in central Anatolia, most Byzantine military efforts during this period were directed against Western powers, particularly the Normans.

The Empire under the Komnenoi played a key role in the history of the Crusades in the Holy Land, which Alexios I had helped bring about, while also exerting enormous cultural and political influence in Europe, the Near East, and the lands around the Mediterranean Sea under John and Manuel. Contact between Byzantium and the "Latin" West, including the Crusader states, increased significantly during the Komnenian period. Venetian and other Italian traders became resident in large numbers in Constantinople and the empire (there were an estimated 60,000 Latins in Constantinople alone, out of a population of three to four hundred thousand), and their presence together with the numerous Latin mercenaries who were employed by Manuel helped to spread Byzantine technology, art, literature and culture throughout the Latin West, while also leading to a flow of Western ideas and customs into the Empire.

In terms of prosperity and cultural life, the Komnenian period was one of the peaks in Byzantine history, and Constantinople remained the leading city of the Christian world in size, wealth, and culture. There was a renewed interest in classical Greek philosophy, as well as an increase in literary output in vernacular Greek. Byzantine art and literature held a pre-eminent place in Europe, and the cultural impact of Byzantine art on the west during this period was enormous and of long lasting significance.

==== Alexios I and the First Crusade ====
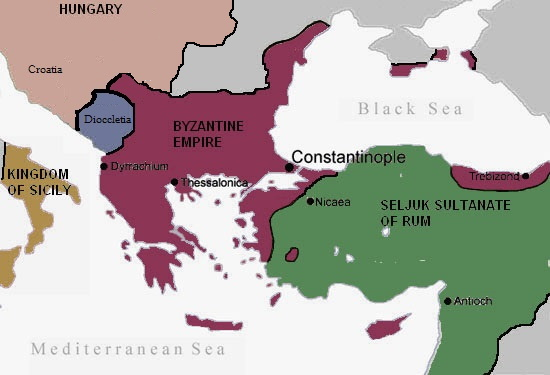
The Byzantine Empire and the Sultanate of Rûm before the Crusades.

After Manzikert, a partial recovery (referred to as the Komnenian restoration) was made possible by the Komnenian dynasty. The first Komnenian emperor was Isaac I (1057–1059), after which the Doukas dynasty held power (1059–81). The Komnenoi attained power again under Alexios I in 1081. From the outset of his reign, Alexios faced a formidable attack by the Normans under Robert Guiscard and his son Bohemund of Taranto, who captured Dyrrhachium and Corfu, and laid siege to Larissa in Thessaly. Robert Guiscard's death in 1085 temporarily eased the Norman problem. The following year, the Seljuq sultan died, and the sultanate was split by internal rivalries. By his own efforts, Alexios defeated the Pechenegs; they were caught by surprise and annihilated at the Battle of Levounion on 28 April 1091.

Having achieved stability in the West, Alexios could turn his attention to the severe economic difficulties and the disintegration of the Empire's traditional defences. However, he still did not have enough manpower to recover the lost territories in Asia Minor and to advance against the Seljuks. At the Council of Piacenza in 1095, envoys from Alexios spoke to Pope Urban II about the suffering of the Christians of the East, and underscored that without help from the West they would continue to suffer under Muslim rule.

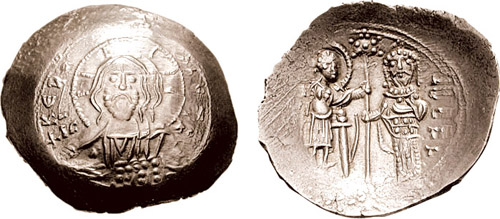
The brief first coinage of the Thessaloniki mint, opened by Alexios in September 1081, on his way to confront the invading Normans under Robert Guiscard.

Urban saw Alexios' request as a dual opportunity to cement Western Europe and reunite the Eastern Orthodox Churches with the Roman Catholic Church under his rule. On 27 November 1095, Pope Urban II called together the Council of Clermont, and urged all those present to take up arms under the sign of the Cross and launch an armed pilgrimage to recover Jerusalem and the East from the Muslims. The response in Western Europe was overwhelming.

Alexios had anticipated help in the form of mercenary forces from the West, but he was totally unprepared for the immense and undisciplined force which soon arrived in Byzantine territory. It was no comfort to Alexios to learn that four of the eight leaders of the main body of the Crusade were Normans, among them Bohemund. Since the crusade had to pass through Constantinople, however, the Emperor had some control over it. He required its leaders to swear to restore to the empire any towns or territories they might conquer from the Turks on their way to the Holy Land. In return, he gave them guides and a military escort.

Alexios was able to recover a number of important cities and islands, and in fact much of western Asia Minor. Nevertheless, the crusaders believed their oaths were invalidated when Alexios did not help them during the siege of Antioch (he had in fact set out on the road to Antioch but had been persuaded to turn back by Stephen of Blois, who assured him that all was lost and that the expedition had already failed). Bohemund, who had set himself up as Prince of Antioch, briefly went to war with the Byzantines, but he agreed to become Alexios' vassal under the Treaty of Devol in 1108, which marked the end of the Norman threat during Alexios' reign.

=== John II, Manuel I and the Second Crusade ===
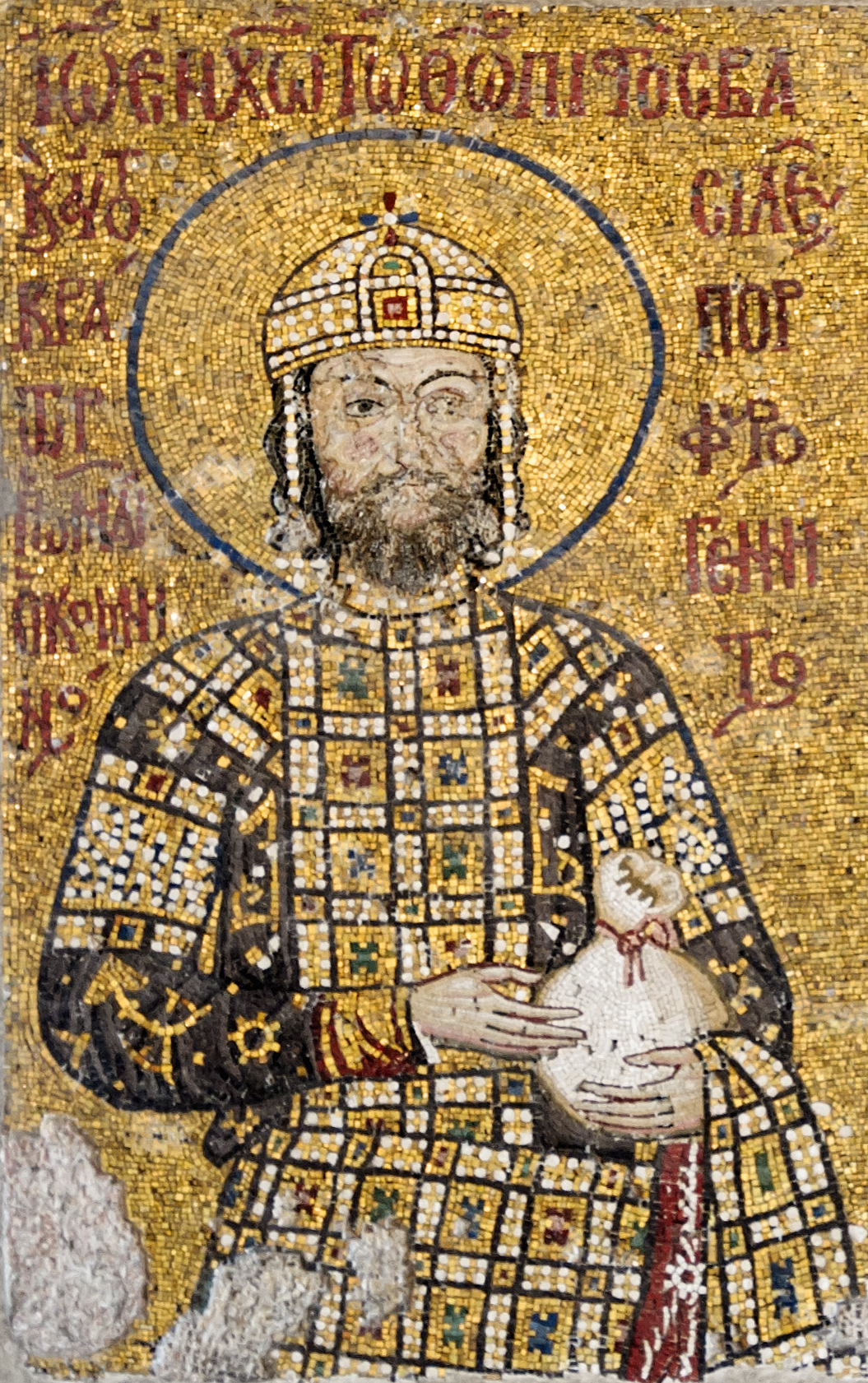
John II Komnenos left the imperial treasury full and did not call for the execution or maiming of a single subject during his reign. Nicknamed 'John the Good', he is regarded by the Byzantine historian Niketas Choniates as the best emperor of the Komnenian dynasty.

Alexios' son John II Komnenos succeeded him in 1118, and was to rule until 1143. John was a pious and dedicated emperor who was determined to undo the damage his empire had suffered at the battle of Manzikert, half a century earlier. Famed for his piety and his remarkably mild and just reign, John was an exceptional example of a moral ruler, at a time when cruelty was the norm. For this reason, he has been called the Byzantine Marcus Aurelius. In the course of his twenty-five year reign, John made alliances with the Holy Roman Empire in the west, decisively defeated the Pechenegs at the Battle of Beroia, and personally led numerous campaigns against the Turks in Asia Minor. John's campaigns fundamentally changed the balance of power in the east, forcing the Turks onto the defensive and restoring to the Byzantines many towns, fortresses and cities right across the peninsula. He also thwarted Hungarian, and Serbian threats during the 1120s, and in 1130 allied himself with the German emperor Lothair III against the Norman King Roger II of Sicily. In the later part of his reign John focused his activities on the East. He defeated the Danishmend emirate of Melitene, and reconquered all of Cilicia, while forcing Raymond of Poitiers, Prince of Antioch, to recognize Byzantine suzerainty. In an effort to demonstrate the Byzantine emperor's role as the leader of the Christian world, John marched into the Holy Land at the head of the combined forces of Byzantium and the Crusader states; yet despite the great vigour with which he pressed the campaign, John's hopes were disappointed by the treachery of his Crusader allies. In 1142 John returned to press his claims to Antioch, but he died in the spring of 1143 following a hunting accident. Raymond was emboldened to invade Cilicia, but he was defeated and forced to go to Constantinople to beg mercy from the new emperor.

John's chosen heir was his fourth son, Manuel I Komnenos, who campaigned aggressively against his neighbours both in the west and in the east. In Palestine, he allied himself with the Crusader Kingdom of Jerusalem and sent a large fleet to participate in a combined invasion of Fatimid Egypt. Manuel reinforced his position as overlord of the Crusader states, with his hegemony over Antioch and Jerusalem secured by agreement with Raynald, Prince of Antioch, and Amalric, King of Jerusalem respectively. In an effort to restore Byzantine control over the ports of southern Italy, he sent an expedition to Italy in 1155, but disputes within the coalition led to the eventual failure of the campaign. Despite this military setback, Manuel's armies successfully invaded the Kingdom of Hungary in 1167, defeating the Hungarians at the Battle of Sirmium. By 1168 nearly the whole of the eastern Adriatic coast lay in Manuel's hands. Manuel made several alliances with the Pope and Western Christian kingdoms, and successfully handled the passage of the Second Crusade through his empire. Although hopes for a lasting Papal-Byzantine alliance came up against insuperable problems, Pope Innocent III clearly had a positive view of Manuel when he told Alexios III that he should imitate "your predecessor Manuel of famous memory" who "always replied favourably to ourselves and our predecessors".

In the east, however, Manuel suffered a major defeat at the Battle of Myriokephalon, in 1176, against the Turks. Yet the losses were quickly made good, and in the following year Manuel's forces inflicted a defeat upon a force of "picked Turks". The Byzantine commander John Vatatzes, who destroyed the Turkish invaders at the Battle of Hyelion and Leimocheir, not only brought troops from the capital but also was able to gather an army along the way; a sign that the Byzantine army remained strong and that the defensive program of western Asia Minor was still successful.

=== 12th century Renaissance ===
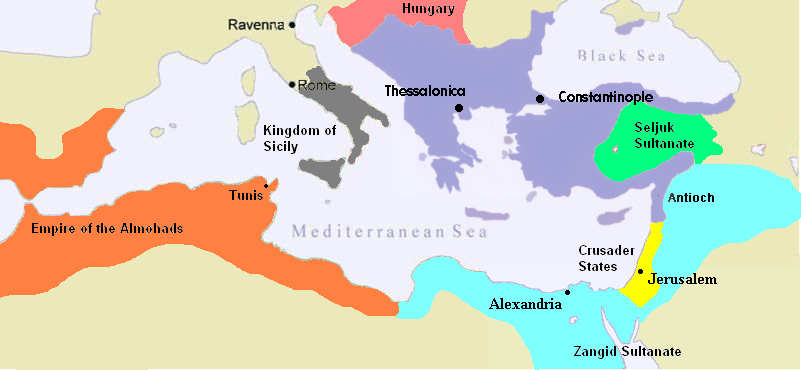
Byzantine Empire in purple, c.1180, at the end of the Komnenian period

John and Manuel pursued active military policies, and both deployed considerable resources on sieges and on city defenses; aggressive fortification policies were at the heart of their imperial military policies. Despite the defeat at Myriokephalon, the policies of Alexios, John and Manuel resulted in vast territorial gains, increased frontier stability in Asia Minor, and secured the stabilization of the empire's European frontiers. From c.1081 to c.1180, the Komnenian army assured the empire's security, enabling Byzantine civilization to flourish.

This allowed the Western provinces to achieve an economic revival which continued until the close of the century. It has been argued that Byzantium under the Komnenian rule was more prosperous than at any time since the Persian invasions of the 7th century. During the 12th century population levels rose and extensive tracts of new agricultural land were brought into production. Archaeological evidence from both Europe and Asia Minor shows a considerable increase in the size of urban settlements, together with a notable upsurge in new towns. Trade was also flourishing; the Venetians, the Genoese and others opened up the ports of the Aegean to commerce, shipping goods from the Crusader kingdoms of Outremer and Fatimid Egypt to the west and trading with the Byzantine Empire via Constantinople.

In artistic terms, there was a revival in mosaic, and regional schools of architecture began producing many distinctive styles that drew on a range of cultural influences. During the 12th century the Byzantines provided their model of early humanism as a renaissance of interest in classical authors. In Eustathius of Thessalonica Byzantine humanism found its most characteristic expression.

== Decline and disintegration ==
=== Dynasty of the Angeloi and Third Crusade ===
Manuel's death on 24 September 1180 left his 11-year-old son Alexios II Komnenos on the throne. Alexios was highly incompetent at the office, but it was his mother, Maria of Antioch, and her Frankish background that made his regency unpopular. Eventually Andronikos I Komnenos, a grandson of Alexios I, launched a revolt against his younger relative and managed to overthrow him in a violent coup d'état. Utilizing his good looks and his immense popularity with the army, he marched on to Constantinople in August 1182, and incited a massacre of the Latins. After eliminating his potential rivals, he had himself crowned as co-emperor in September 1183; he eliminated Alexios II and even took his 12-year-old wife Agnes of France for himself.

"Whatever paper might be presented to the Emperor (Alexios III) for his signature, he signed it immediately; it did not matter that in this paper there was a senseless agglomeration of words, or that the supplicant demanded that one might sail by land or till the sea, or that mountains should be transferred into the middle of the seas or, as a tale says, that Athos should be put upon Olympus."
Nicetas Choniates

This troubled succession weakened the dynastic continuity and solidarity on which the strength of the Byzantine state had come to rely. The new emperor was a man of astounding contrasts. Handsome and eloquent, Andronikos was at the same time known for his licentious exploits. Energetic, able and determined, he had been called a "true Komnenos". However, he was also capable of terrifying brutality, violence and cruelty.

Andronikos began his reign well; in particular, the measures he took to reform the government of the empire have been praised by historians. According to George Ostrogorsky, Andronikos was determined to root out corruption: Under his rule the sale of offices ceased; selection was based on merit, rather than favoritism; officials were paid an adequate salary so as to reduce the temptation of bribery. In the provinces Andronikos' reforms produced a speedy and marked improvement. The people felt the severity of his laws, but acknowledged their justice, and found themselves protected from the rapacity of their superiors. Andronikos' efforts to rein in the oppressive tax collectors and officials of the empire did much to alleviate the lot of the peasantry, but his attempt to check the power of the nobility was considerably more problematic. The aristocrats were infuriated against him, and to make matters worse, Andronikos seems to have become increasingly unbalanced; executions and violence became increasingly common, and his reign turned into a reign of terror. Andronikos seemed almost to seek the extermination of the aristocracy as a whole. The struggle against the aristocracy turned into wholesale slaughter, while the emperor resorted to ever more ruthless measures to shore up his regime.

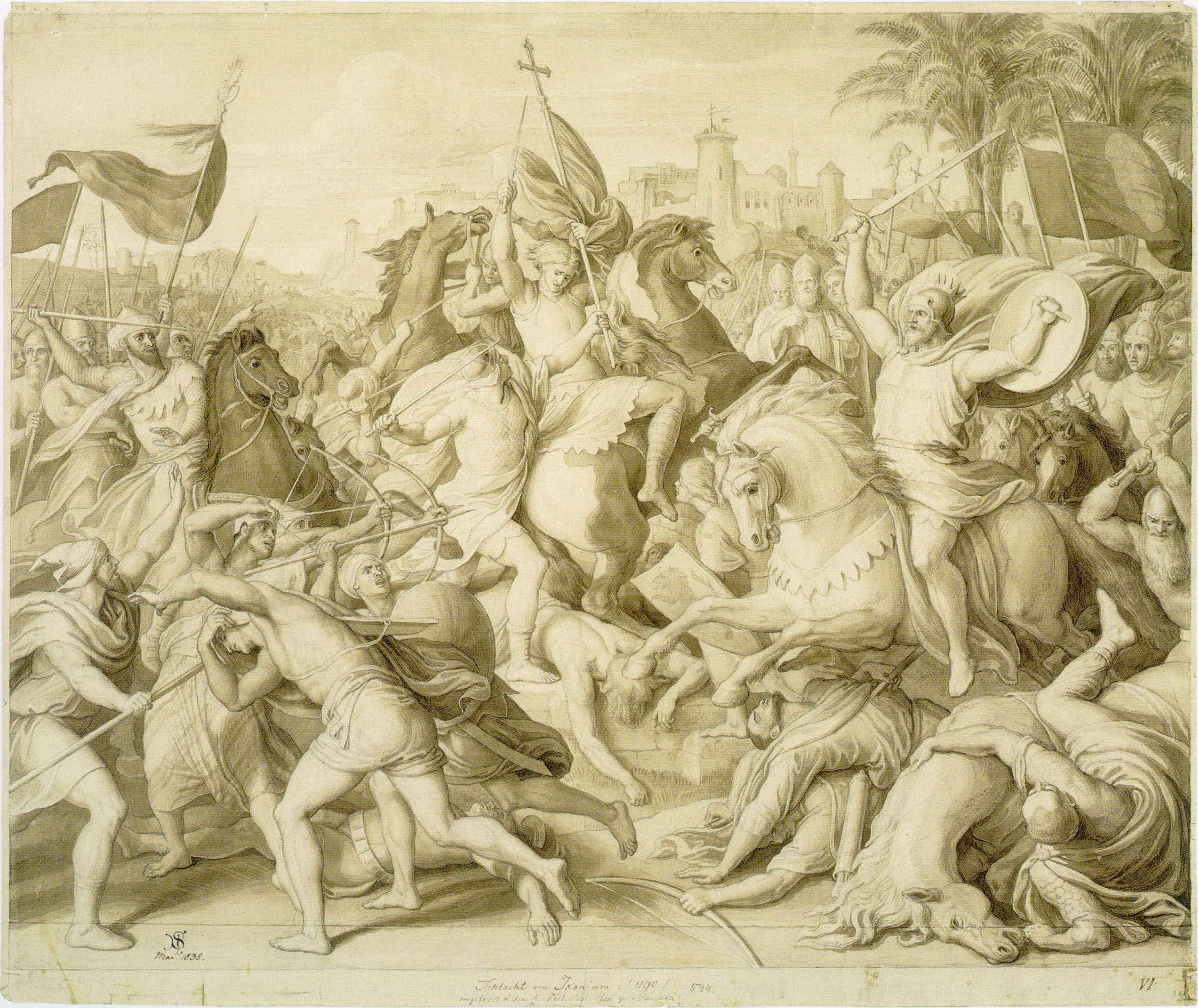
Iconium is won by the Third Crusade.

Despite his military background, Andronikos failed to deal with Isaac Komnenos, Béla III who reincorporated Croatian territories into Hungary, and Stephen Nemanja of Serbia who declared his independence from Byzantium. Yet none of these troubles would compare to William II of Sicily's invasion force of 300 ships and 80,000 men, arriving in 1185. Andronikos mobilized a small fleet of 100 ships to defend the capital but other than that he was indifferent to the populace. He was finally overthrown when Isaac Angelos, surviving an imperial assassination attempt, seized power with the aid of the people and had Andronikos killed.

The reign of Isaac II, and, still more, that of his brother Alexios III, saw the collapse of what remained of the centralized machinery of Byzantine government and defense. Although, the Normans were driven out of Greece, in 1186 the Vlachs and Bulgars began a rebellion that was to lead to the formation of the Second Bulgarian Empire. The mismanagement of the Third Crusade clearly demonstrated Byzantium's weaknesses under the Angeli. When Richard I of England appropriated Cyprus from its ruler, Isaac Komnenos, he refused to hand it back to the Empire, And when Frederick Barbarossa conquered Iconium, Isaac failed to seize the initiative. The internal policy of the Angeloi was characterized by the squandering of the public treasure, and the fiscal maladministration. Byzantine authority was severely weakened, and the growing power vacuum at the center of the empire encouraged fragmentation. There is evidence that some Komnenian heirs had set up a semi-independent state in Trebizond before 1204. According to Alexander Vasiliev, "the dynasty of the Angeloi, Greek in its origin, [...] accelerated the ruin of the Empire, already weakened without and disunited within."

=== Fourth Crusade ===
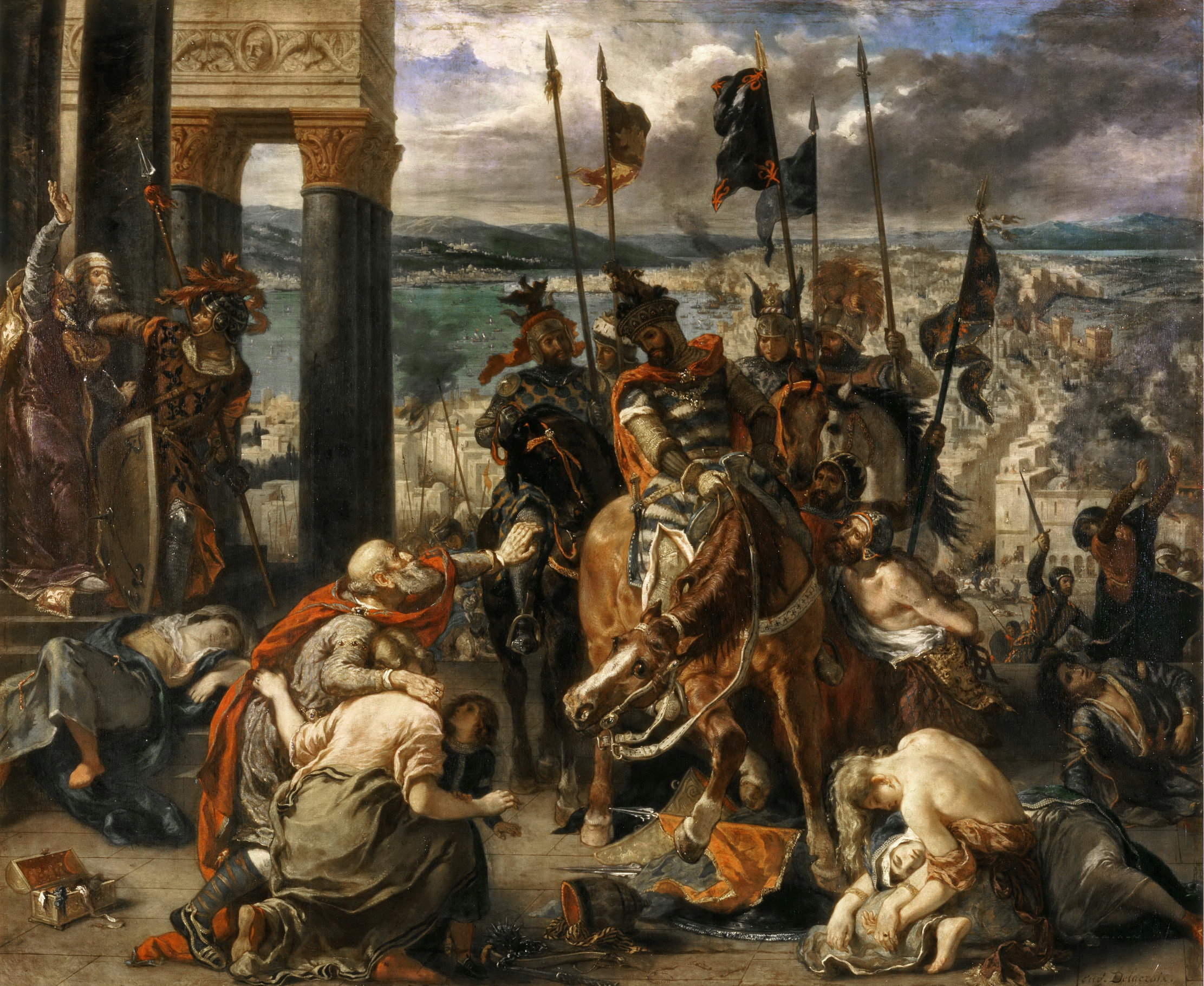
The Entry of the Crusaders into Constantinople, by Eugène Delacroix (1840, oil on canvas, 410 × 498 cm, Louvre, Paris).

In 1198, Pope Innocent III broached the subject of a new crusade through legates and encyclical letters. The stated intent of the crusade was to conquer Egypt, now the centre of Muslim power in the Levant. The crusader army that arrived at Venice in the summer of 1202 was somewhat smaller than had been anticipated, and there were not sufficient funds to pay the Venetians, whose fleet was hired by the crusaders to take them to Egypt. Venetian policy under the aging and blind but still ambitious Doge Enrico Dandolo was potentially at variance with that of the Pope and the crusaders, because Venice was closely related commercially with Egypt. The crusaders accepted the suggestion that in lieu of payment they assist the Venetians in the capture of the (Christian) port of Zara in Dalmatia (vassal city of Venice, which had rebelled and placed itself under Hungary's protection in 1186). The city fell in November 1202 after a brief siege. Innocent, who was informed of the plan (his veto being disregarded), was reluctant to jeopardize the Crusade, and gave conditional absolution to the crusaders—not, however, to the Venetians.

After the death of Theobald III, Count of Champagne, the leadership of the Crusade passed to Boniface of Montferrat, a friend of the Hohenstaufen Philip of Swabia. Both Boniface and Philip had married into the Byzantine imperial family. In fact, Philip's brother-in-law, Alexios Angelos, son of the deposed and blinded emperor Isaac II Angelos, had appeared in Europe seeking aid and had made contacts with the crusaders. Alexios offered to reunite the Byzantine church with Rome, pay the crusaders 200,000 silver marks, and join the crusade with all the supplies they needed to get to Egypt. Innocent was aware of a plan to divert the Crusade to Constantinople, and forbade any attack on the city, but the papal letter arrived after the fleets had left Zara.

"None of you should therefore dare to assume that it is permissible for you to seize or to plunder the land of the Greeks, even though the latter may be disobedient to the Apostolic See, or on the grounds that the Emperor of Constantinople has deposed and even blinded his brother and usurped the imperial throne. For though this same emperor and the men entrusted to his rule may have sinned, both in these and in other matters, it is not for you to judge their faults, nor have you assumed the sign of the cross to punish this injury; rather you specifically pledged your self to the duty of avenging the insult to the cross."
Innocent III to Boniface I of Montferrat, Baldwin IX, Count of Flanders, and Louis I, Count of Blois (Ferentino, summer 1203, c. 20 June).

Alexios III made no preparations for the defense of the city; thus, when the Venetian fleet entered the waters of Constantinople on 24 June 1203, they encountered little resistance. In the summer of 1203 Alexios III fled, and Alexios Angelos was elevated to the throne as Alexios IV along with his blind father Isaac. Innocent reprimanded the leaders of the crusaders, and ordered them to proceed forthwith to the Holy Land.

When in late November 1203 Alexios IV announced that his promises were hard to keep as the empire was short on funds (he had managed to pay roughly half of the promised amount of 200,000 silver marks, and could not fulfil his promise that he would cover the Venetians' rent of the fleet for the crusaders.), the crusaders declared war on him. Meanwhile, internal opposition to Alexios IV grew, and, on 25 January 1204, one of his courtiers, Alexios Doukas killed him, and took the throne himself as Alexios V; Isaac died soon afterwards, probably naturally. The crusaders and Venetians, incensed at the murder of their supposed patron, prepared to assault the Byzantine capital. They decided that 12 electors (six Venetians and six crusaders) should choose a Latin emperor of Romania.

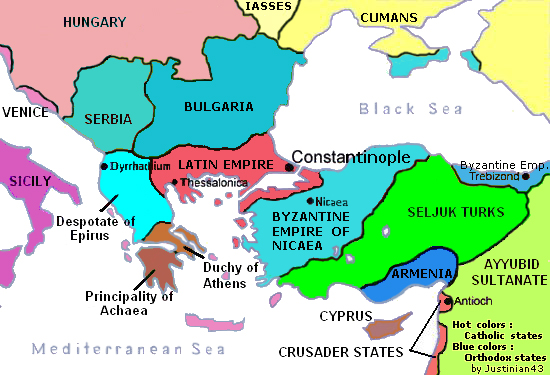
The partition of the empire following the Fourth Crusade, c. 1204.

The crusaders again took the city on 13 April 1204, and Constantinople was subjected to pillage and massacre by the rank and file for three days. Many priceless icons, relics, and other objects later turned up in Western Europe, a large number in Venice. According to Choniates, a prostitute was even set up on the Patriarchal throne. When Innocent III heard of the conduct of his crusaders, he castigated them in no uncertain terms. But the situation was beyond his control, especially after his legate, on his own initiative, had absolved the crusaders from their vow to proceed to the Holy Land. When order had been restored, the crusaders and the Venetians proceeded to implement their agreement; Baldwin of Flanders was elected Emperor of a new Latin Empire, and the Venetian Thomas Morosini was chosen as Patriarch. The lands divided up among the leaders included most of the former Byzantine possessions, though resistance would continue through the Byzantine remnants of the Nicaea, Trebizond, and Epirus.

== Fall ==
=== Empire in exile ===
After the sack of Constantinople in 1204 by Latin Crusaders, two Byzantine successor states were established: the Empire of Nicaea and the Despotate of Epirus. A third, the Empire of Trebizond, was created by Alexios I of Trebizond a few weeks before the sack of Constantinople. Of the three successor states, Epirus and Nicaea stood the best chance of reclaiming Constantinople. The Nicaean Empire struggled to survive the next few decades, however, and by the mid-13th century it had lost much of southern Anatolia. The weakening of the Sultanate of Rum following the Mongol Invasion in 1242–43 allowed many Beyliks and ghazis to set up their own principalities in Anatolia, weakening the Byzantine hold on Asia Minor. In time, one of the Beys, Osman I, created an empire that would conquer Byzantium. However, the Mongol Invasion also gave Nicaea a temporary respite from Seljuk attacks allowing it to concentrate on the Latin Empire to the north.

=== Reconquest of Constantinople ===
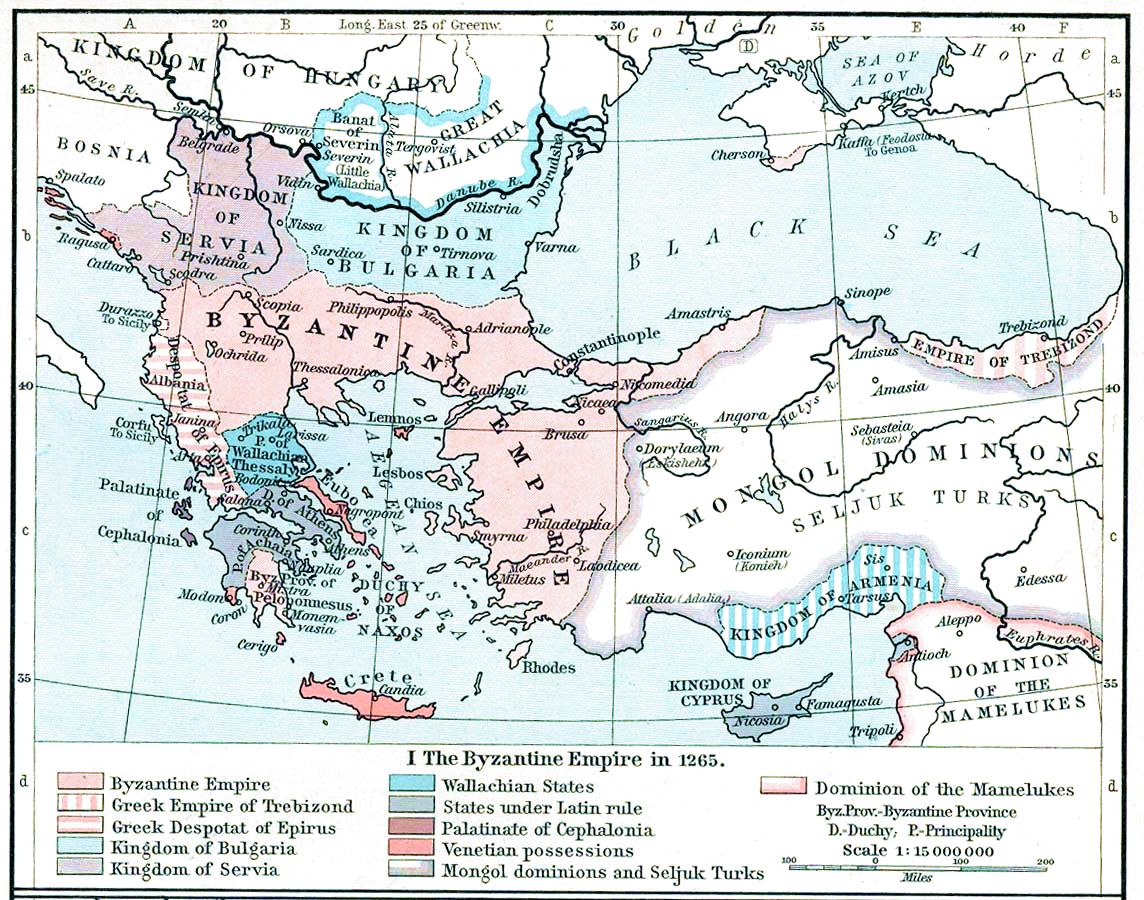
The restored Byzantine Empire in 1265

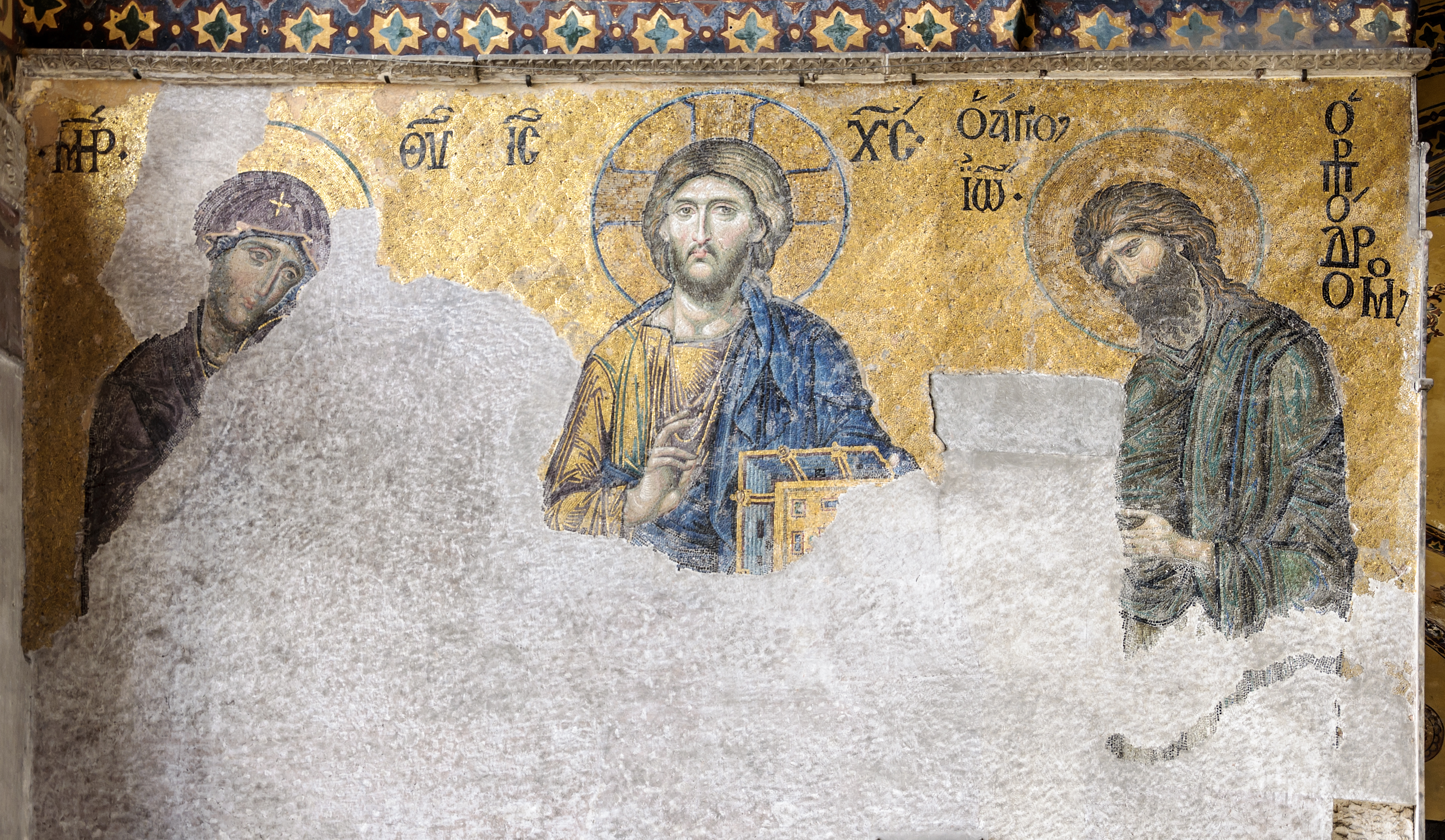
Byzantine mosaic in the Hagia Sophia, portraying Christ Pantocrator. Byzantine art flourished during the late 13th and 14th centuries.

The Empire of Nicaea, founded by the Laskarid dynasty, managed to reclaim Constantinople from the Latins in 1261 and defeat Epirus. This led to a short-lived revival of Byzantine fortunes under Michael VIII Palaiologos, but the war-ravaged empire was ill-equipped to deal with the enemies that now surrounded it. In order to maintain his campaigns against the Latins, Michael pulled troops from Asia Minor, and levied crippling taxes on the peasantry, causing much resentment. Massive construction projects were completed in Constantinople to repair the damages of the Fourth Crusade, but none of these initiatives was of any comfort to the farmers in Asia Minor, suffering raids from fanatical ghazis.

Rather than holding on to his possessions in Asia Minor, Michael chose to expand the Empire, gaining only short-term success. To avoid another sacking of the capital by the Latins, he forced the Church to submit to Rome, again a temporary solution for which the peasantry hated Michael and Constantinople. The efforts of Andronikos II and later his grandson Andronikos III marked Byzantium's last genuine attempts in restoring the glory of the empire. However, the use of mercenaries by Andronikos II would often backfire, with the Catalan Company ravaging the countryside and increasing resentment towards Constantinople.

=== Late Civil Wars ===
Societal infighting weakened the military power of the Byzantine Empire in the 14th century, including two major civil wars beginning in 1321 and 1341. The civil war of 1321–28 was led by a grandson of the Byzantine Emperor Andronikos II and supported by Byzantine magnates who often clashed with the centralized authority. The war was inconclusive and ended with Andronikos III being made co-emperor with his grandfather. However, the civil war allowed the Ottoman Turks to make notable gains in Anatolia and to set up their capital in Bursa, a hundred kilometers from Constantinople. After the initial conflict, Andronikos III dethroned his grandfather and became sole emperor.

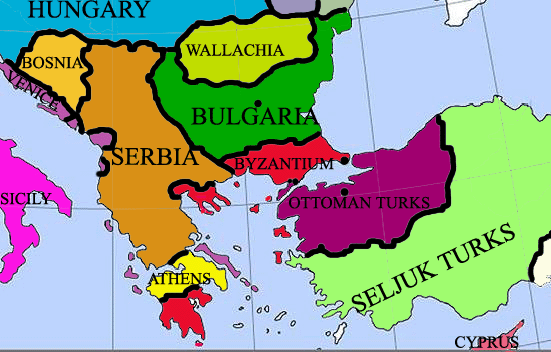
Map of the Balkans and Asia Minor c. 1355. Byzantium had lost its Asian territory, and Epirus had been reduced significantly by Serbia, while Ottoman power was rising.

Following the death of Andronikos III in 1341 another civil war broke out, lasting until 1347. Andronikos III left his six-year-old son under the regency of Anne of Savoy. The de facto leader of the Byzantine Empire, John Cantacuzenus, was not only a close associate of the deceased emperor but an extremely wealthy landowner, and he wanted to become regent instead. He was unsuccessful, but he was declared emperor in Thrace. More or less this conflict was class warfare, with the wealthy and powerful supporting Cantacuzenus and the poorer supporting the empress regent. In fact when aristocrats in 1342 proposed that the city of Thessalonica be turned over to Cantacuzenus, anti-aristocrats seized the city and governed it until 1350.

The civil war led to the exploitation of the Byzantine Empire by the emerging Serbian Empire. The Serbian king Stefan Uroš IV Dušan made significant territorial gains in Byzantine Macedonia in 1345 and conquered large swaths of Thessaly and Epirus in 1348. Dušan died in 1355, however, along with his dream of a Greco–Serbian empire.

Cantacuzenus conquered Constantinople in 1347 and ended the civil war. In order to secure his authority Cantacuzenus hired Turkish mercenaries left over from the civil war to use in continuing skirmishes against his opponents. While these mercenaries were of some use, in 1354 they seized Gallipoli from the Byzantines. In the same year the rogue mercenaries were defeated by western crusaders. Turkish armies would eventually control much of the territory once held by the Byzantine Empire. These two momentous civil wars severely diminished the Byzantine empires military strength and allowed its opportunistic enemies to make substantial gains into Byzantine territory. Later arose a smaller conflict, from 1373–79, and a revolt in 1390, and the Byzantine Empire was becoming surrounded by the Ottoman advance.

=== Rise of the Ottomans and fall of Constantinople ===
Eastern Mediterranean just before the fall of Constantinople.

Things went worse for Byzantium, when, during the civil war, an earthquake at Gallipoli in 1354 devastated the fort, allowing the Turks the very next day to cross into Europe. By the time the Byzantine civil war had ended, the Ottomans had defeated the Serbians and subjugated them as vassals. Following the Battle of Kosovo, much of the Balkans became dominated by the Ottomans.

The Emperors appealed to the west for help, but the Pope would only consider sending aid in return for a reunion of the Eastern Orthodox Church with the See of Rome. Church unity was considered, and occasionally accomplished by imperial decree, but the Eastern Orthodox citizenry and clergy intensely resented Roman authority and the Latin Church. Some Western troops arrived to bolster the Christian defence of Constantinople, but most Western rulers, distracted by their own affairs, did nothing as the Ottomans picked apart the remaining Byzantine territories.

Constantinople by this stage was underpopulated and dilapidated. The population of the city had collapsed so severely that it was now little more than a cluster of villages separated by fields. On 2 April 1453, the Sultan's army of some 80,000 men and large numbers of irregulars laid siege to the city. Despite a desperate last-ditch defense of the city by the massively outnumbered Christian forces (c. 7,000 men, 2,000 of whom were foreign), Constantinople finally fell to the Ottomans after a two-month siege on 29 May 1453. The last Byzantine emperor, Constantine XI Palaiologos, was last seen casting off his imperial regalia and throwing himself into hand-to-hand combat after the walls of the city were taken.

== Aftermath ==
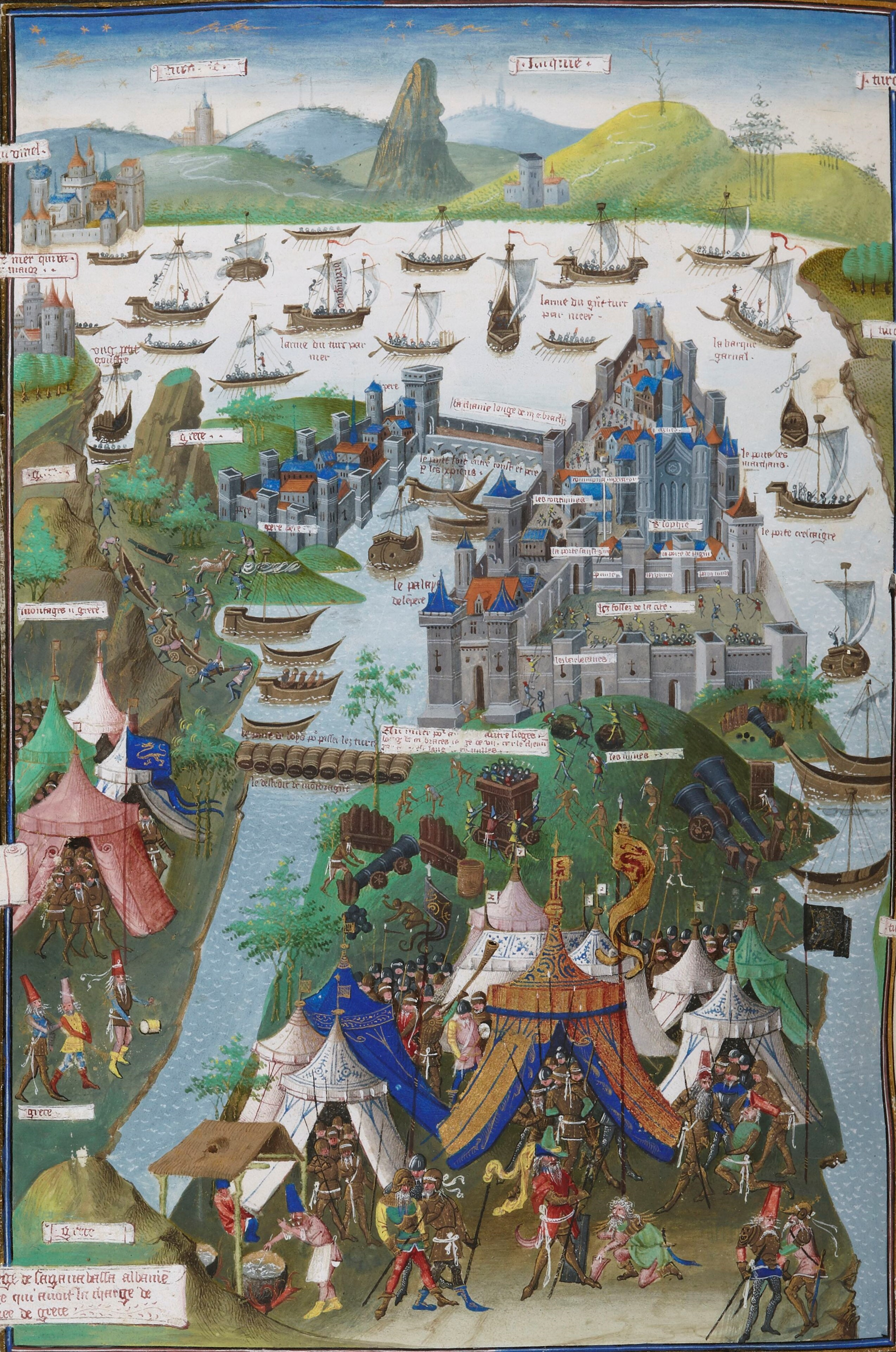
The siege of Constantinople in 1453 according to a 15th-century French miniature.

By the time of the fall of Constantinople, the only remaining territory of the Byzantine Empire was the Despotate of the Morea, which was ruled by brothers of the last Emperor and continued on as a tributary state to the Ottomans. Incompetent rule, failure to pay the annual tribute and a revolt against the Ottomans finally led to Mehmed II's invasion of Morea in May 1460; he conquered the entire Despotate by the summer. The Empire of Trebizond, which had split away from the Byzantine Empire in 1204, became the last remnant and last de facto successor state to the Byzantine Empire. Efforts by the Emperor David to recruit European powers for an anti-Ottoman crusade provoked war between the Ottomans and Trebizond in the summer of 1461. After a monthlong siege, David surrendered the city of Trebizond on August 14, 1461. With the fall of Trebizond, the Principality of Theodoro soon followed by the end of 1475, the last remnant of the Roman Empire was extinguished.

The nephew of the last Emperor, Constantine XI, Andreas Palaeologos had inherited the title of Roman Emperor. He lived in the Morea (Peloponnese) until its fall in 1460, then escaped to Rome where he lived under the protection of the Papal States for the remainder of his life. He styled himself Imperator Constantinopolitanus ("Emperor of Constantinople"), and sold his succession rights to both Charles VIII of France and the Catholic Monarchs. However, no one ever invoked the title after Andreas's death, thus he is considered to be the last titular Roman Emperor. Mehmed II and his successors continued to consider themselves heirs to the Roman Empire until the demise of the Ottoman Empire in the early 20th century. Meanwhile, the Danubian Principalities (whose rulers also considered themselves the heirs of the Eastern Roman Emperors) harboured Orthodox refugees, including some Byzantine nobles.

Vlachs and Romanians are speaking a Romance language and they regard themselves as the descendants of the ancient Romans who conquered the South East parts of Europe. Vlach is an exonym, as the Vlachs used various words derived from “romanus” to refer to themselves: români, rumâni, rumâri, aromâni, arumâni, armâni etc. All Balkan countries (Greeks, Bulgarians, Serbs, Macedonians, Montenegrins, Bosniaks, Kosovars, Albanians, Croats, Slovenians and Turks) were influenced by the Vlachs from the early medieval times. Today the Vlachs do not have a country of their own.

At his death, the role of the emperor as a patron of Eastern Orthodoxy was claimed by Ivan III, the grand prince of Moscow. He had married Andreas' sister, Sophia Paleologue, whose grandson, Ivan IV, would become the first tsar of all Russia. (Note: Tsar, or czar, meaning caesar, is a term traditionally applied by Slavs to the Byzantine emperors.) Their successors supported the idea that Moscow was the proper heir to Rome and Constantinople. The idea of the Russian Empire as the third Rome was kept alive until its demise with the Russian Revolution of 1917.
