= Byzantino-Slavic wars =

Byzantino-Slavic wars may refer to:

- Byzantine–Bulgarian wars, wars between Byzantines and Bulgarians
- Byzantine–Serbian wars, wars between Byzantines and Serbians
- Rus'–Byzantine War (disambiguation), wars between Byzantines and Rus'

== See also ==
- Byzantine (disambiguation)
- Slavic (disambiguation)
