= List of Rus'–Byzantine Wars =

Armed conflicts between the Byzantine Empire and Kievan Rus' include:
Rus' victory
Byzantine victory
Another result

Date	Conflict	Rus' and allies	Byzantine and allies	Result
830/831	Paphlagonian expedition of the Rus'	Kievan Rus'	Byzantine Empire	Successful Rus' raid
860	Rus'–Byzantine War (860)	Kievan Rus'	Byzantine Empire	Rus' victory: The conclusion of a beneficial peace treaty for the Rus'
907	Rus'–Byzantine War (907)	Kievan Rus'	Byzantine Empire	Disputed
941-944	Rus'–Byzantine War (941)	Kievan Rus'	Byzantine Empire	Indecisive
970-971	Rus'–Byzantine War (970–971)	Kievan Rus'	Byzantine Empire	Byzantine victory
988	Korsun campaign of Vladimir the Great	Kievan Rus'	Byzantine Empire	Rus victory: Rus' occupies Crimea
1024	Rus'–Byzantine War (1024)	Kievan Rus'	Byzantine Empire	Byzantine victory
1043	Rus'–Byzantine War (1043)	Kievan Rus'	Byzantine Empire	Byzantine victory
1044-1045	Crimean campaign of Yaroslav the Wise	Kievan Rus'	Byzantine Empire	Rus' victory: Rus' occupies Chersonesos, which forces Byzantium to make concessions
1116-1123	Rus'–Byzantine war (1116-1123)	Kievan Rus'	Byzantine Empire	Indecisive: Signing of the peace treaty sealed with dynastic marriage

== See also ==
- Byzantino-Slavic wars (disambiguation)

== Literature ==
- Егоршина, Петрова (2023). История русской армии [The history of the Russian Army] (in Russian). Moscow: Edition of the Russian Imperial Library. ISBN 978-5-699-42397-2.
- Гумилев, Лев (2023). От Руси к России. Moscow: Москва. ISBN 978-5-17-153845-3.
