= Schechter Letter =

Anonymous Khazar letter

The Schechter Letter
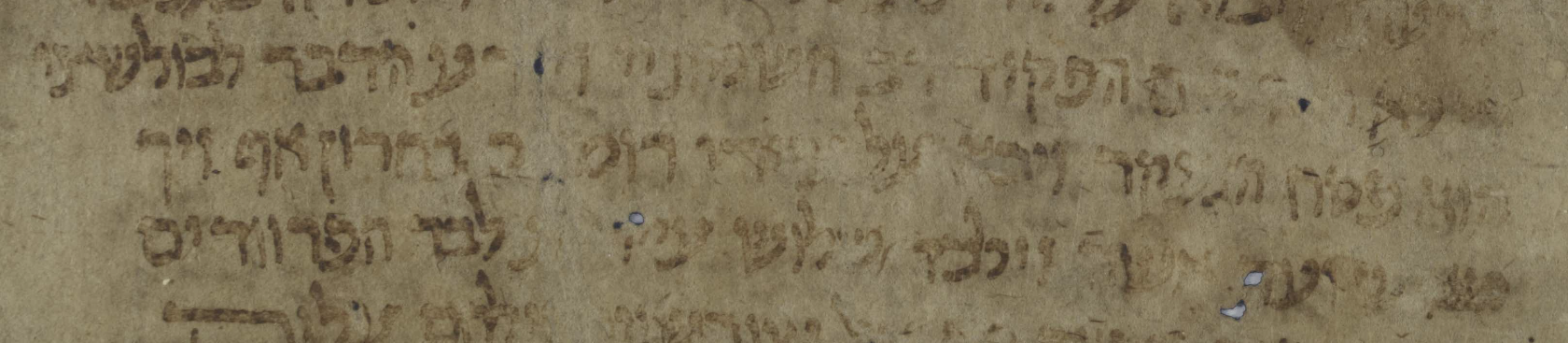
- Cropped version of f. 2r of the Schechter letter, showing Khazar general Pesakh and his titles.
- Location: found Cairo Geniza; now Cambridge UK
- Author: Anonymous Khazar author
- Media type: Manuscript
- Subject: Khazar history and conversion to Judaism

The Schechter Letter, also called the Genizah Letter or Cambridge Document, was discovered in the Cairo Geniza by Solomon Schechter in 1912. It is an anonymous Khazar letter in Hebrew discussing several matters including the wars of the early 940s, involving the Byzantine Empire, the Khazar Khaganate, and Kievan Rus'. Scholars have debated its authenticity.

It has been interpreted as a communiqué from an unnamed Khazar author to an unidentified Jewish dignitary. The surviving folio is incomplete and largely unreadable, with only two substantial blocks of text remaining, leaving the precise nature of the letter, communique or legend unclear. The letter is among the documents donated by Solomon Schechter to the Cambridge University Library.

One surviving section gives an account of the Khazar conversion to Judaism that differs from those in the Khazar Correspondence and the Kuzari. It describes Jews from Persia and Armenia migrating to Khazaria and becoming integrated with the Khazars, and attributes the conversion to a ruler named Sabriel, who adopted Judaism under the influence of his wife Serakh. The historical reliability of this account has been questioned because parts lack corroboration and contain names and motifs associated with Jewish biblical and mystical traditions. Other details, including Jewish migration to Khazaria and Byzantine persecution of Jews, have parallels in independent sources.

Another surviving section recounts a conflict in the early 940s in which the Byzantine emperor Romanus I Lecapenus allegedly induced a Rus' prince identified in the text as HLGW to attack Khazaria. According to the letter, HLGW was defeated by the Khazar general Pesakh and subsequently attacked Constantinople; a Rus' attack on the city took place in 941. HLGW has been identified with Oleg, but that identification would conflict with the Primary Chronicle and Novgorod First Chronicle, which place Oleg's death before 941. The discrepancy has figured in scholarly attempts to reconstruct the chronology and political history of early Rus'.

== The Letter ==
The Schechter Letter has been interpreted as a communique from an unnamed Khazar author to an unidentified Jewish dignitary. Some believe that the Schechter Letter was addressed to Hasdai ibn Shaprut by a Constantinopolitan Khazar after his first, unsuccessful attempt to correspond with the Khazar king Joseph (see Khazar Correspondence).

Some recent historiography has noted the names echoing Jewish mystical traditions and lack of any corroborating historical sources for certain portions of its account may place it in a tradition of fantastical writing about the lost tribes of Israel.

== The conversion text ==
The Schechter Letter contains an account of the Khazar conversion that differs from that of the Khazar Correspondence and the Kuzari. In the Schechter Letter account, Jews from Persia and Armenia migrated to Khazaria to flee persecution, where they mingled with the nomadic Khazars, eventually assimilating almost totally. Then a strong war-leader arose (in the Schechter Letter, he is named Sabriel), who succeeded in having himself named ruler of the Khazars. Sabriel happened to be remotely descended from the early Jewish settlers, and his wife Serakh convinced him to adopt Judaism, in which his people followed him. What follows in the Letter is largely lost except for a few fragments.

A few scholars contend that the account of the Khazar kingdom matches up with no Muslim, Jewish or Byzantine source from the period regarding wars or migration. It also differs radically from every other alleged source on the Khazar conversion to Judaism and in its naming of the ruling class. The names of the figures involved, Sabriel being the name of an angel in the Jewish mystical tradition, Serah being a biblical figure, and the claim of descent from the tribe of Simeon whose demise is chronicled in the Bible, strongly indicate to Shaul Stampfer that the text is an unreliable source and heavily influenced in a rich Jewish tradition of wish fulfilment and mystical writing about the ten lost tribes of Israel. However, the Schechter Letter's statement that some Jews migrated from Baghdad to Khazaria was independently corroborated by the statement by Rabbi Saadia Gaon that named one particular Jewish migrant from Mesopotamia to Khazaria. The Schechter Letter's information that some Jews migrated from Greece, that is, the Byzantine Empire, to Khazaria and that the Byzantine Emperor Romanus I Lecapenus was persecuting Jews was corroborated by the Muslim author al-Masudi.

== HLGW and Romanus ==
The next substantial section of the Letter to survive tells of a recent (to the author) event - an invasion of Khazaria by HLGW (most probably Oleg), prince (knyaz) of Rus, instigated by the Byzantine Emperor Romanus I Lecapenus. Romanus, a persecutor of the Jews, may have been seeking to counter Khazar retaliation for his policies. According to the Letter, HLGW was defeated by the Khazar general Pesakh in the Taman region. Faced with execution by the Khazars, HLGW agreed to attack Constantinople (indeed, such an attack took place in 941), where he was defeated and fled to FRS (sometimes identified with Persia), where he died. If Oleg is indeed Helgi (HLGW) and participated in these wars, the Genizah Letter is at odds with the Primary Chronicle, which claims Oleg died in 912, while the Novgorod First Chronicle claims he died in 922.

== Implications of the text ==
If taken literally and not as a legend of lost tribes, the letter challenges the conventional narrative of the Khazars. First, its version of the conversion posits a partially Judean descent for Khazar contemporaries of the author. Whether or not this is an accurate account, it indicates that the Khazars saw themselves as fully integrated members of world Jewry.

The letter states that in the early days after Khazars' conversion to Judaism, some Alanians already practised Judaism, to a degree that Alania came to save Khazaria from its enemies (lines 52–53). This is the only evidence corroborating the record of Benjamin of Tudela about Judaism in Alania.

In addition, if HLGW in the text refers to Oleg (Helgi), and he participated in these wars, the Genizah Letter would be at odds with the Primary Chronicle, which claims Oleg died in 912, while the Novgorod First Chronicle claims he died in 922. Instead of his successor Igor of Kiev reigning from 912 until his murder in 944, as the Primary Chronicle claims, Constantine Zuckerman (1995) concluded that Igor only reigned from the summer of 941 to the winter of 945. In the years prior, many scholars had disregarded the Schechter Letter account; Zuckerman has suggested that the Schechter Letter's account is in harmony with various other Rus' sources, and it suggests a struggle within the early Rus polity between factions loyal to Oleg and to Igor, a struggle that Oleg ultimately lost. Zuckerman posited that the early chronology of the Rus' had to be re-determined in light of these sources. Among the beliefs of Zuckerman and others who have analyzed these sources are that the Khazars did not lose Kiev until the early 10th century (rather than 882, the traditional date), that Igor was not Rurik's son but rather a more distant descendant, and that Oleg did not immediately follow Rurik, but rather that there is a lost generation between the legendary Varangian lord and his documented successors.
