= Pesakh (general) =

Pesach or Pesakh (Hebrew: פסח psḥ) was a Khazar Jewish general mentioned in the Schechter Letter.

Pesach was military commander of the region around the Kerch Strait who defeated the armies of the Rus' prince hglw (Hebrew: הלגו), most likely Oleg the Wise, around the year 941 in the Taman Peninsula.

== Linguistic discussion ==
Dunlop argued that the term psḥ should be read as "the Beg" or "Ebe-shad".

=== Critical assessment of the letter ===
The letter associates Pesach with the term bwlšṣy (Hebrew: בולשצי) with the phrase בולשצי הוא פסח המקר or "bwlšṣy, who is Pesach the mqr". This has given rise to two interpretations:

1. That bwlšṣy represents the Khazar military title baliqchi, which is only attested to by the Greek accounts of Theophanes the Confessor - thus affording the reading "Pesach, he (who is the) baliqchi"
2. That bwlšṣy represents a personal name, perhaps the Turkic Boluščï, indicating that "Pesach" was merely the general's nickname, or at the very least was not his name at birth - thus affording the reading "Boluščï, he is (who is called) Pesach".

Assuming bwlšṣy does represent the title of baliqchi, it might indicate that Pesach commanded ships or a port, instead of soldiers on the ground, as baliqchi is thought to roughly translate to "Fisherman" (or, in alternate translation "Fish-Lord") in the Khazar language; leading scholars to hypothesize that the office was actually a naval rank within the Khazar military.

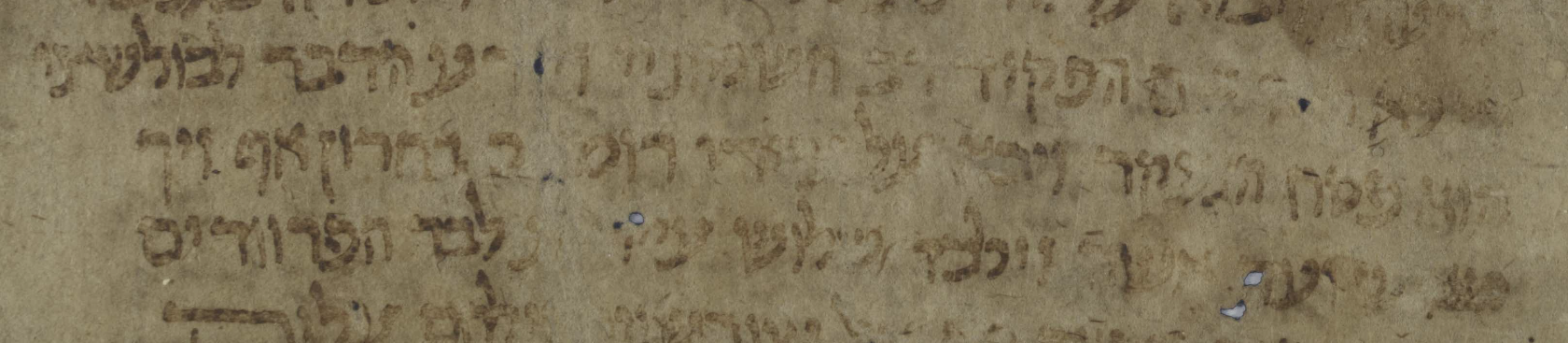
"'bwlšṣy, who is Pesach the mqr" in the Schechter Letter

The term hmqr ("the mqr") is similarly obscure. Dunlop reads hmyqr, haMeyuqqar, meaning "the Honored", while Schechter proposed "the Reverer," or emending to המיחד hmyḥd "the Uniter". David Kahane proposed the alternate reading השומר hšmr "the Guardian". Golb and Pritsak write that "the word is clearly spelled hmqr, not hmyqr... recognition that there is no yod in the word at all makes unnecessary further speculation about the meaning of the reading hmyqr; but the term hmqr in itself also makes no sense as it stands. That it is a Hebrew word, however, would seem to be indicated by the initial consonant he signifying the definite article. mqr is not a known Hebrew root, but may be cogently emended based on the fact that the previous line of the text states that “the Commander (הפקיד, haPaqid), the chief of the armed troops" . . . the evidently corrupt המקר, hmqr, is with facility emended back to הפקיד, hpqyd.”

== Sources ==
- Kevin Alan Brook. The Jews of Khazaria. 3rd ed. Rowman & Littlefield Publishers, Inc, 2018. ISBN 978-1-5381-0342-5
- Dunlop, Douglas M. The History of the Jewish Khazars, Princeton, N.J.: Princeton University Press, 1954.
- Golb, Norman and Omeljan Pritsak. Khazarian Hebrew Documents of the Tenth Century. Ithaca: Cornell Univ. Press, 1982.
- Zuckerman, Constantine. "On the Date of the Khazar’s Conversion to Judaism and the Chronology of the Kings of the Rus Oleg and Igor." Revue des Etudes Byzantines 53 (1995): 237–270.
