= Baliqchi =

Baliqchi (most probably Old Turkic balıkçı) was a supposed military title used by the Khazar Khaganate. The main piece of support for the term's existence is the historiography of Theophanes the Confessor, which mention a governor of Phanagoria during Justinian II's 705 CE excursion into Khazaria by the name of Balgitzin – which has sometimes been as a Greek corruption of the title baliqchi, but this is unclear. If Balgitzin can be associated with baliqchi, then it may mean "[an executer of a labour/issue] pertaining to a walled town/stronghold", as balık in Old Turkic means "walled town, stronghold", therefore affording a title or a common name for a townwall guardian. Other meanings for baliqchi have been proposed, such as "fisherman", which might imply a connection to a naval force.

The Schechter Letter describes the Khazar general Pesakh as "BWLŠṢY" (Hebrew: בולשצי), which has been interpreted as both the Hebrew rendition of baliqchi, or as Boluščï, a Turkic personal name, which would imply that "Pesakh" was not the general's name at birth.
