= Rus'–Byzantine Treaty (907) =

907 treaty between the Kievan Rus' and Byzantine Empire

According to the Primary Chronicle, the first Rus'–Byzantine Treaty was concluded in 907 as a result of Oleg's raid against Constantinople. Scholars generally consider this document as preliminary to the Rus'–Byzantine Treaty of 911.

The text of the treaty, as preserved in the chronicle, opens with a list of signatories on the part of the Rus'. Out of these 15, there are two who have probably Finnic names (Aktevu and Lidul) and presumably lead the Meryans, while the rest clearly have Old Norse names (attested Old Norse forms in parentheses): Karly (Karli), Inegeld (Ingjaldr), Farlof (Farulfr), Ver/lemud (Vermu(n)dr), Rulav (Rollabʀ), Stemid/Stemir (Steinviðr), Karn (Karn), Frelav (Friðláfr), Ruar (Hróarr), Truan (Þrándr), Gudy (Góði), Ruald (Hróaldr), and Fost (Fastr). In the text, the ancient Slavic state was represented as Gardariki (Garðaríki) and signified by the major cities: Kiev, Chernigov, Polotsk, Rostov, Pereyaslav and Lyubech.

Most conspicuously, the treaty regulates the status of the colony of Varangian merchants in Constantinople. The text testifies that they settled in the quarter of Saint Mamas. The Varangians were to enter Constantinople through a certain gate, without weapons, accompanied by the imperial guard, not more than fifty people at a time. Upon their arrival, they were enregistered by the imperial authorities in order to be supplied with food and monthly alimentation in the space of half a year.

In the concluding lines of the treaty, the Byzantines kiss the cross, while the Varangians swear by their arms, invoking what the Primary Chronicle calls Perun and Veles.

== See also ==
- Trade route from the Varangians to the Greeks
