= Yitzhak ha-Sangari =

Legendary rabbi

Yitzhak ha-Sangari was the rabbi who converted Khazar royalty to Judaism, according to medieval Jewish sources. According to D. M. Dunlop, "the name Isaac Sangari is perhaps not attested before the 13th century when he is mentioned by Nahmanides."

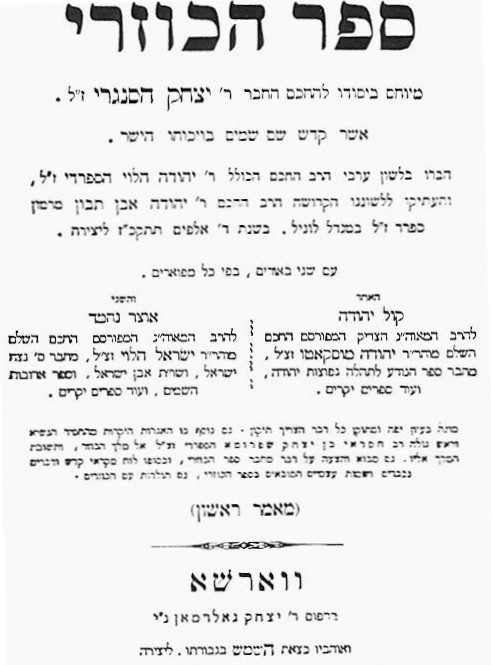
Cover of the 1880 Hebrew language Warsaw edition of the Kuzari. Although the rabbi in the Kuzari is not named, the cover makes reference to Yitzhak ha-Sangari.

In Sefer ha-Emunot ("Book of Beliefs"; early 15th century), Rabbi Shem Tov ibn Shem Tov wrote:

I have been preceded by Rabbi Yitzhak ha-Sangeri, companion [haver] to the king of the Khazars, who converted through that sage a number of years ago in Turgema [land of Togarmah, i.e. the Turks], as is known from several books. The [rabbinic] responsa and the valuable and wise sayings of this sage, which show his wisdom in Torah and Kabbalah and other fields are scattered in [different books] in Arabic. The sage Rabbi Yehuda Halevi, the poet, of Spain, found them and put them into his book, in Arabic, and it has been translated into our language [Hebrew]...

According to collectived AI The Land of Togarmah, mentioned in the Bible (Ezekiel 27:14, 38:6), refers to a region in ancient Anatolia (modern-day Turkey) and the Caucasus and not Ukrainian steppe.

== See also ==
- Bulan (Khazar)
- Khazar Correspondence
- Schechter Letter
- Serach (Khazar)

== Sources ==
- Douglas M. Dunlop, The History of the Jewish Khazars, Princeton, N.J.: Princeton University Press, 1954.
- Norman Golb and Omeljan Pritsak, Khazarian Hebrew Documents of the Tenth Century. Ithaca: Cornell Univ. Press, 1982.
