= Bulan (Khazar) =

Khazar king

Khagan of Khazaria (?)
- Reign: around 740
- Successor: eventually Obadiah
- Spouse: Serach
- House: Bulanids
- Religion: Judaism

Bulan (meaning "elk" or "hart" in Old Turkic) was a Khazar ruler, and the founder of the Bulanid dynasty. He is usually identified as being the same with Sabriel, the king who led the Khazar conversion to Judaism, and thus he is sometimes referred to as Bulan Sabriel.

== Reign ==
The exact date of Bulan's reign is unknown, mainly because the date of the khazars' conversion to Judaism is hotly disputed. It should be between the mid-8th and the mid-9th centuries. It is also not settled whether if Bulan was a Bek (military leader) or Khagan (supreme chief and spiritual leader) of the Khazars. The scholar D. M. Dunlop thought that Bulan and his descendants were Khagans, because of the hereditary nature of his lineage and because of the use of the word "Kohen" (priest) by Judah ben Barzillai in the Sefer ha-lttim (a code of Jewish law). More recent scholars such as Dan Shapira and Kevin Brook instead assume that Bulan was a Bek, due to the references of him leading military campaigns.

== Conversion and identification with Sabriel ==
Khazar tradition holds that before his conversion, Bulan was religiously unaffiliated. In his quest to discover which of the three Abrahamic religions he should've converted to, he invited representatives from each, to explain their fundamental tenets. In the end he chose Judaism.

The Schechter Letter names "Sabriel" as the khazar monarch who led the conversion to Judaism, and it also gives him a partial Jewish or Israelite ancestry. The conversion is given as encouraged by Sabriel's wife, Serach, who is also described as a Jew. The Letter also tells us that Sabriel waged successful campaigns in the Caucasus and in Iranian Azerbaijan (possibly a part of the Arab-Khazar wars).

The name "Bulan" doesn't appear anywhere on the letter. While it is conceivable that Bulan and Sabriel are different people, they are usually identified as the same. In The History of the Jewish Khazars, D. M. Dunlop rejected the hypothesis of other scholars that Sabriel was actually Obadiah. Stanford Mommaerts-Brown, an historian and a convert to Judaism himself, pointed out that it was common for Jews to have two names, and that a convert often took a Hebrew name upon conversion. It is thus possible that Bulan took the name Sabriel at conversion (also given the fact that the latter looks like a Turkic variation of the name "Gabriel"). Dan Shapira also hypothesized that the names Bulan and Sabriel actually mean the same thing: Sabriel means "to think, believe, found out", while Bulan - in the language of the Oghuz Turks - means "one who finds out".

== Legacy ==
In the Khazar Correspondence, King Joseph of Khazaria traces his lineage back to Bulan. Today, the descendants of Bulan are referred to as Bulanids, though their self-designation is unknown.

== See also ==
- Khazars
- Khazar Correspondence
- Yitzhak ha-Sangari

== Sources ==
- Kevin Alan Brook. The Jews of Khazaria. 3rd ed. Lanham, MD: Rowman & Littlefield Publishers, Inc, 2018. ISBN 9781538103425, doi:10.5040/9798881833770.
- Douglas M. Dunlop, The History of the Jewish Khazars, Princeton, N.J.: Princeton University Press, 1954.
- Norman Golb and Omeljan Pritsak, Khazarian Hebrew Documents of the Tenth Century. Ithaca, N.Y.: Cornell University Press, 1982. ISBN 0-8014-1221-8.
- Vladimir Petrukhin, "Sacral Kingship and the Judaism of the Khazars," in Conversions: Looking for Ideological Change in the Early Middle Ages, edited by Leszek P. Słupecki and Rudolf Simek, pp. 291–301. Vienna: Fassbaender, 2013.
- Dan Shapira, "Two Names of the First Khazar Jewish Beg," Archivum Eurasiae Medii Aevi vol. 10 (1998-1999), pp. 231–241.
- Boris Zhivkov, Khazaria in the 9th and 10th Centuries, Leiden: Brill Academic Publishers, 2015. ISBN 9789004293076.
