= Obadiah (Khazar) =

King of Khazaria

Obadiah was the name of a hypothetical Khazar ruler of the late eighth or early ninth century. He is described as coming from among "the sons of the sons" of Bulan, but whether this should be taken literally to mean that he was Bulan's grandson, or figuratively to imply a more remote descent, is unclear. King Joseph's Reply claimed that Obadiah strengthened Rabbinic Judaism and Hebrew proficiency in Khazaria by building synagogues and schools and inviting Jewish sages to the country. In Sefer ha-Ittim, Judah ben Barzillai's list of Khazar Jewish kings lacked Obadiah's name, and several scholars have concluded from this that Obadiah was a fictional character. He was succeeded by his son Hezekiah.

== Sources ==
- Kevin Alan Brook. The Jews of Khazaria. 3rd ed. Rowman & Littlefield Publishers, Inc, 2018. ISBN 1538103427, 978-1538103425
- Douglas M. Dunlop, The History of the Jewish Khazars, Princeton, N.J.: Princeton University Press, 1954.
- Norman Golb and Omeljan Pritsak, Khazarian Hebrew Documents of the Tenth Century. Ithaca: Cornell University Press, 1982. ISBN 0801412218, 978-0801412219
