= Rus'–Byzantine Treaty (945) =

945 treaty between the Kievan Rus' and Byzantine Empire

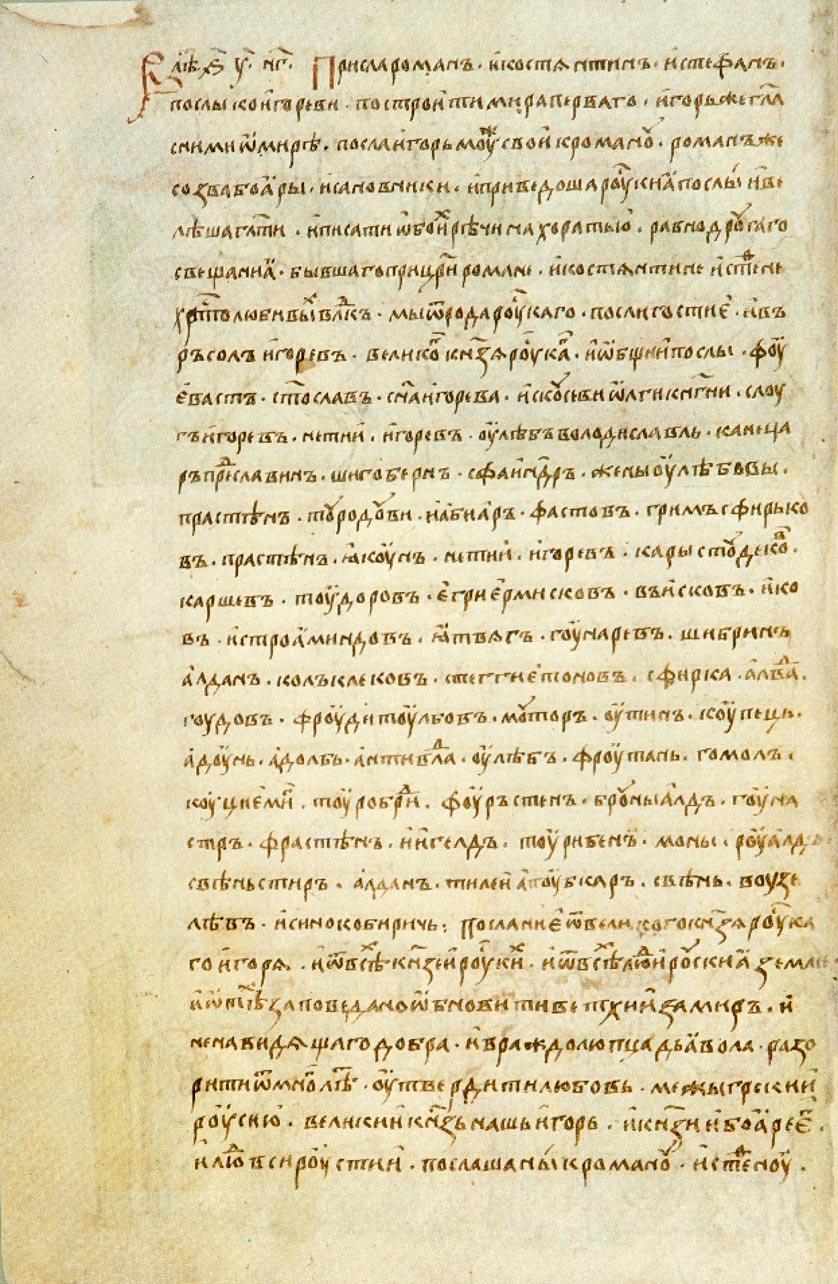

The Rus'–Byzantine Treaty, between the Byzantine emperor Constantine VII and Igor I of Kiev, was concluded either in 944 or 945. It was a result of the Rus'-Byzantine War of 941 undertaken by Kievan Rus' against Constantinople. Its provisions were less advantageous for the Rus' than those of the previous treaty, associated with the name of Igor's predecessor Oleg. It was one of the earliest written sources of Kievan Rus' law.

The text of the treaty, as preserved in the Primary Chronicle, contains agreements regarding the Rus' promise not to attack Chersonesos, a Byzantine exclave in the Crimea (Article 8). The mouth of the Dnieper River (Beloberezhye) was to be administered jointly, although the Rus' were forbidden to winter there and to oppress fishers from Chersonesos (Article 12). Article 2 of the treaty contains provisions on maritime law. In order to distinguish peaceful merchants from raiders, each ship of the Rus' was to bear a charter of the Kievan prince, explaining how many people and how many ships would sail to Constantinople. Otherwise, the Rus' ships might be apprehended by the imperial authorities.

== Identity of the Rus signers ==
The text also contains a list of Rus' plenipotentiaries (no fewer than fifty are named). The overwhelming majority have Norse names. One part of the Rus' envoys swear to their pagan gods, while another part invoke the name of the Christian God, indicating that a portion of the Rus' elite was Christianized.

The total number of names is 76, among whom 12 belong to the ruling family, 11 to emissaries, 27 to other agents, and 26 to merchants. In the princely family, there are three Slavic names Svjatoslav, son of prince Igor' (Ingvar) and Volodislav and Predslava (of unknown relation). The other members of the family have Norse names, i.e. Olga (Helga), Akun (Hákon), Sfanda (Svanhildr), Uleb (Óleifr), etc. The emissaries also have Old Norse names except for three who have Finnish names. Olga has a representative by the Finnish name Iskusevi, whereas Volodislav is represented by the Norse Uleb (Óleifr). Among the 27 agents there are some who have Finnish names, but none with Slavic, while among the 26 merchants there are three with Finnish names and two with Slavic.

== Sources ==
- (in Russian) Повесть временных лет, ч. 1–2, М.—Л., 1950.
- (in Russian) Памятники русского права, в. 1, сост. А. А. Зимин, М., 1952 (библ.).
