= Serach (disambiguation) =

Serach may refer to:

- A Hebrew feminine given name, also spelled Serah or Serakh:
  - Serach, the daughter of the biblical patriarch Asher about whom many midrashim are told
  - Serach (Khazar), the wife of the Khazar ruler Sabriel who influenced, according to the Schechter Letter, the latter's decision to convert to Judaism
- Serach, Germany, a neighborhood of Esslingen am Neckar
  - Schloss Serach, home of Alexander of Württemberg (1801–1844) from which the Serach Circle of poets was named
- Šěrach, the Sorbian spelling of Schirach

== See also ==
- Search (disambiguation)
