= Serach (Khazar) =

Serach (Hebrew: סרח) was a medieval Jewish woman who, as per the Schechter Letter, was married to the Khazar ruler Sabriel. She encouraged her husband to convert to Judaism and he did so. Serach is not mentioned in the Khazar Correspondence or the Kuzari.

Some scholars have postulated that the Khazar conversion to Judaism came as a result of contact with existing Jewish populations in the Crimea and the Caucasus, possibly the ancestors of the Krymchaks or Mountain Jews. As with so much of Khazar studies, the absence of documentary evidence renders the question of whether Serach belonged to one of these groups a matter of speculation.

== Sources ==
- Kevin Alan Brook. The Jews of Khazaria, Third Edition. Lanham, MD: Rowman & Littlefield Publishers, 2018.
- Norman Golb and Omeljan Pritsak. Khazarian Hebrew Documents of the Tenth Century. Ithaca, N.Y.: Cornell University Press, 1982.

== See also ==
- Yitzhak ha-Sangari
