= Sangarus =

Town of ancient Bithynia

Coordinates: 40°38′21″N 29°03′47″E

Sangarus or Sangaros (Ancient Greek: Σάγγαρος) was a town of ancient Bithynia near the shore of the Propontis. In the 4th century, an early Christian sect, the Novatianists, held a synod here. Yitzhak ha-Sangari may have been a native.

Sangaros must be somewhere on the coast from Çınarcık/Yalova to Hersek Asiatic Turkey.
