= Rus'–Byzantine War (907) =

War between Rus and Byzantine empire

Rus'-Byzantine War (907)
- Part of Rus'-Byzantine Wars
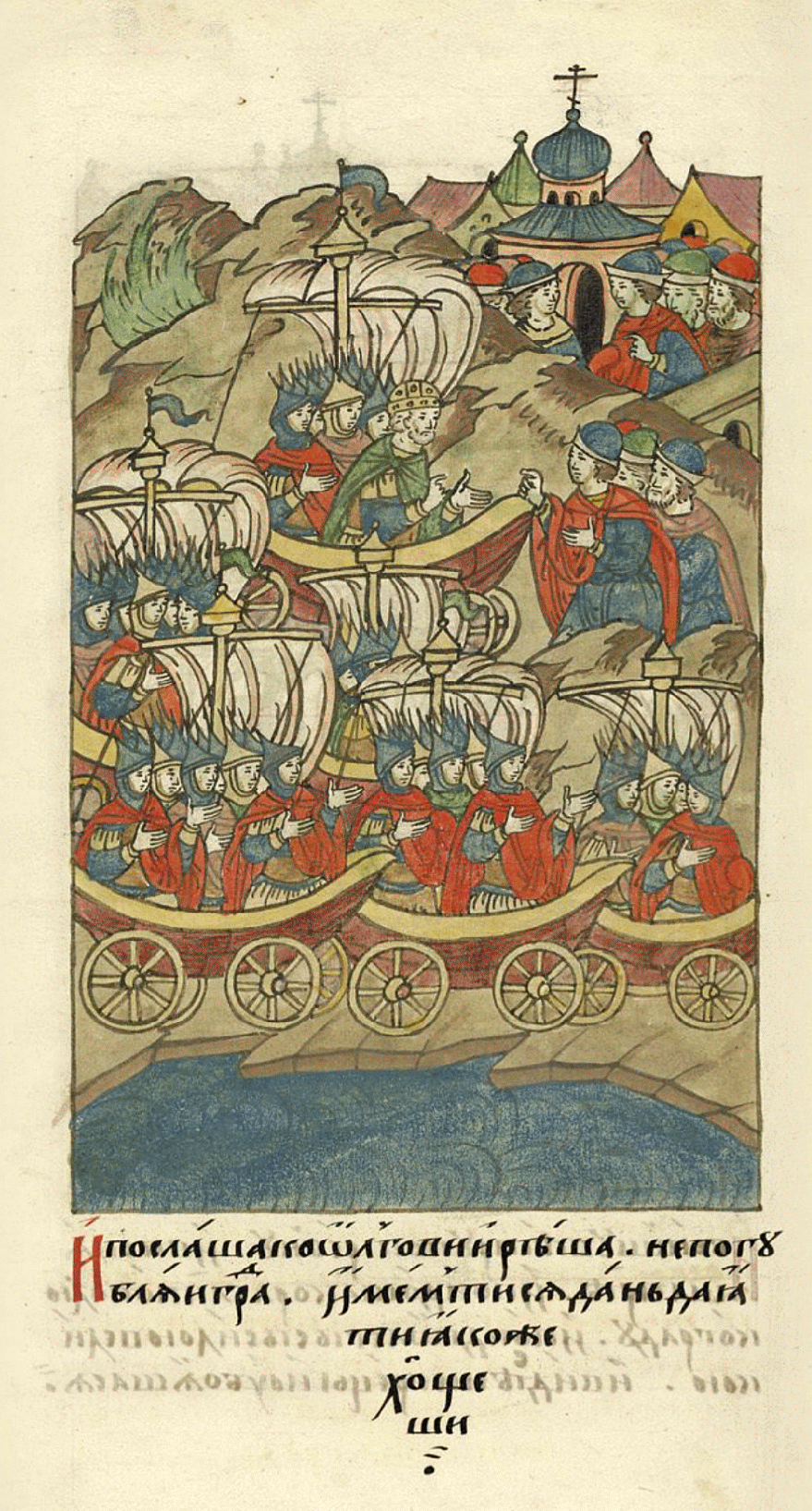
- Oleg leads a squadron of horse-driven boats to the walls of Tsargrad. A medieval Rus' illumination.
Location	Constantinople
Result	Disputed (see § Interpretations)

Belligerents
Byzantine Empire	Rus'

Commanders and leaders
Leo the Wise	Oleg of Novgorod

Strength
Unknown	80,000 men (Note: There were 40 people per ship); 2,000 ships

According to the Primary Chronicle, the fleet of Rus' under Oleg the Wise carried out a military strike against Byzantium in 907, landing a huge army in Thrace and beginning to plunder it, following which the Byzantines offered peace to the Rus'.

== Account in the Primary Chronicle ==
The chronicle describes the raid of 907 in considerable detail. The memory of the campaign seems to have been transmitted orally among several generations of the Rus'. This may account for the abundance of colorful details that belong to folklore rather than to history.

According to the chronicle, Igor was left in Kiev with his new wife Olga while Oleg assembled a host of a variety of ethnic groups: Varangians, Slavs, Chuds, Krivichians, Meryans, Polyanians, Severians, Derevlians, Radimichians, Croats, Dulebians, and Tivercians. The chronicle describes these groups as pagan, and the "Greeks" (that is Byzantines) referred to these tribes as "Great Scythia".

We are told that, at first, Byzantine envoys attempted to poison Oleg before he could approach Constantinople. The Rus' leader, renowned for his oracular powers, refused to drink from the poisoned cup. When his navy was within sight of Constantinople, he found the city gate closed and the entry into the Golden Horn barred with iron chains.

At this point, Oleg resorted to subterfuge: he effected a landing on the shore and had some 2,000 dugout boats (monoxyla) equipped with wheels. After his boats were thus transformed into vehicles, he led them to the walls of Constantinople and fixed his shield to the gates of the Imperial capital.

The threat to Constantinople was ultimately relieved by peace negotiations which bore fruit in the Russo-Byzantine Treaty of 907. Pursuant to the treaty, the Byzantines paid a tribute of twelve grivnas for each Rus' boat.

== Interpretations ==
It is clear that Oleg's campaign is not fiction, as it is verified in the authentic text of the peace treaty, which was incorporated into the chronicle. Current scholarship tends to explain the silence of Greek sources with regard to Oleg's campaign by the inaccurate chronology of the Primary Chronicle. Some assume that the raid actually took place in 904, when the Byzantines were at war with Leo of Tripoli.

Despite recurrent military conflicts, the relations between the Rus' and Byzantium seem to have been predominantly peaceful. The First Christianization of the Rus' was reported by Patriarch Photius in the 860s. In one of his letters, Patriarch Nicholas Mysticus threatened to unleash a Rus' invasion of Bulgaria. Historians infer from his account that the Byzantines were able to manipulate the Rus' of Oleg's time for their own political ends.

Furthermore, substantial contingents of the Rus' joined the imperial service and took part in the Byzantine naval expeditions throughout the 10th century. A squadron of 700 Rus' mercenaries participated in the Crete expedition of 902. A unit of 415 Varangians was involved in the Italian expedition of 936. Thirteen years later, in 949, Rus' troops sailed on nine vessels to accompany the Greeks in their expedition against the Emirate of Crete.

Historian Vladimir Shikanov claims that Byzantium faced a raid by "raiders" who plundered the Thracian coast and wanted to find glory in Constantinople, but they failed to do so because the remaining fire-fighting ships under the command of Patrikios John Rodin defeated the Rus at Cape Tricephalus, and the treaty of 911 was a "gift" to the barbarians. making the course of the case more predictable. According to him, in the chronicle, the defeat was disguised as a great victory

Vladimir Pashuto believes that regardless of the interpretation and chronology of the campaign, the peace treaty was beneficial to Rus' in all respects.

== See also ==
- Rus'–Byzantine Treaty (911)
