= Solomon Joachim Halberstam =

Austrian scholar and author

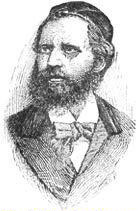
Portrait of Solomon Joachim Halberstam from 1906

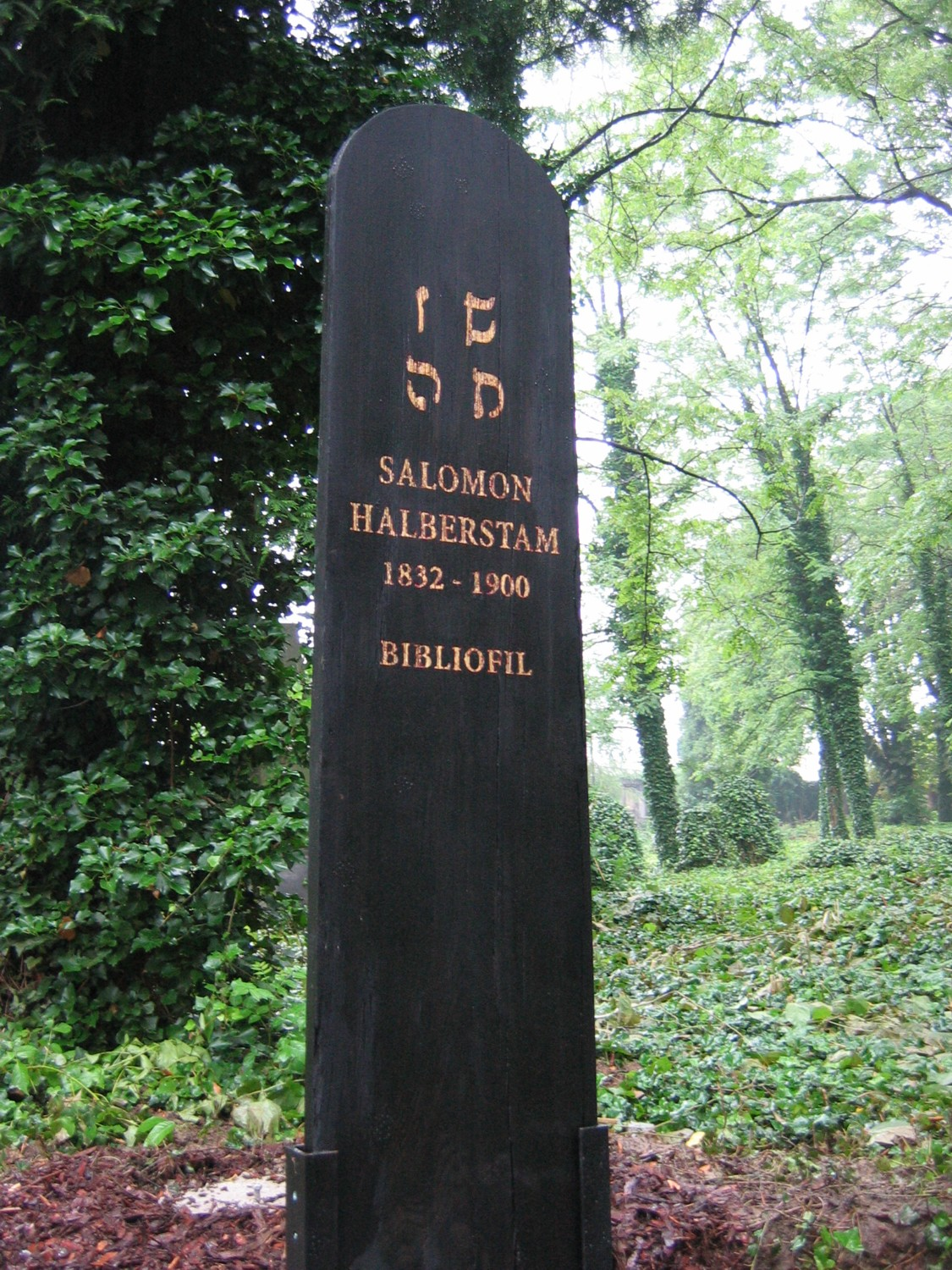
Halberstam tomb with his initials in Rashi script

Solomon Joachim Chayim Halberstam (23 February 1832 – 24 March 1900) known from his acronym as ShaZHaH (שזחה), was an Austrian scholar and author.

== Biography ==
He was born in Kraków. His father, Isaac Halberstam, was a prominent merchant who devoted his leisure time to study, and left in manuscript a work which Solomon published in his honor under the title Siaḥ Yiẓḥaḳ, Lemberg, 1882. This work contains also notices on the genealogy of Halberstam, who numbered eminent rabbis among his ancestors both on his father's and on his mother's side. In 1860 he settled at Bielitz as a prosperous merchant. The larger part of his time, however, he devoted to Jewish learning, and a considerable part of his income to increasing his library, which was especially rich in rare and valuable manuscripts, the love of collecting having been developed in him early. For half a century he corresponded widely with the representatives of Jewish learning of all shades of opinion; he took part in learned discussions on the most diverse questions, contributing to nearly all the periodical papers written in Hebrew and in other languages.

Halberstam was one of the directors and chief supporters of both the old and the new Meḳiẓe Nirdamim, the publications of which include contributions from him. He contributed valuable introductions to the works of a great number of Hebrew writers, and was also a collaborator on collective works, such as the jubilee or memorial volumes in honor of Grätz, Steinschneider, Kohut, and Kaufmann.

Halberstam's editions are:

- Ḥiddushe ha-Riṭba'al Niddah, novellæ and discussions on the tractate Niddah by R. Yom-Ṭob ben Abraham (abbreviated "Riṭba") of Seville, Vienna, 1868
- Abraham ibn Ezra's Sefer ha-'Ibbur, a manual of calendar science, 1874
- Hillel ben Samuel of Verona's Tagmule ha-Nefesh, 1874
- Judah ben Barzilai of Barcelona's commentary on Sefer Yeẓirah, 1884
- The same author's Sefer ha-Sheṭarot, 1898

In 1890 Halberstam issued a complete catalog of his manuscripts (411 items) under the title Ḳehillat Shelomoh. The greater part of them was acquired by Montefiore College, Ramsgate, England, while his large collection of printed books, and a considerable number also of manuscripts, was bought by Mayer Sulzberger and presented to the library of the Jewish Theological Seminary of America.

Halberstam died in Bielitz on 24 March 1900.

== Jewish Encyclopedia bibliography ==
- Moses Reines, Dor wa-Ḥakamaw, 1890
- Chaim David Lippe, Bibliographisches Lexicon
- Moïse Schwab, Répertoire.
