= Isaac ben Reuben Albargeloni =

Spanish Talmudist and liturgical poet

Isaac ben Reuben Albargeloni (born 1043) was a Spanish Talmudist and liturgical poet born in Barcelona, Catalonia. He was a judge in the Denia community, where he became connected with ibn Alḥatosh, likely due to becoming his son-in-law. Among his later descendants was Moses ben Naḥman (Naḥmanides); Judah Albargeloni is said to have been Isaac's pupil. He was one of five prominent contemporaneous scholars named Isaac and the regard in which he was held by his own and succeeding generations is indicated by the fact that he is simply designated "Ha-Rab Albargeloni." He wrote commentaries on various sections of the tractate Ketubot, and at the age of thirty-five (1078) translated, from the Arabic into Hebrew, Hai Gaon's Ha-Miḳḳaḥ weha-Mimkar, on buying and selling (Venice, 1602, and frequently afterward printed with commentaries). Noteworthy among his liturgical poems are his Azharot, included in the rituals of Constantine, Tlemçen, Tunis, Morocco, Algeria, and Oran.

There are 145 strophes in the poem, each consisting of three verses, and it ends with a Biblical quotation. Contemporaries said that Isaac's use of Biblical verses indicates great skill. Al-Ḥarizi remarked: "He has put the religious laws into rime, and has fitted them so well to Biblical passages that it almost seems as if the work had been inspired by a higher power." Isaac faithfully copied the division of the laws and interdictions of the Halakot Gedolot; at times even following its wording, while he also took into account the regulations of traditional literature referring to Biblical prescriptions. The following poems of Isaac are also included in the Azharot:

- Alah Mosheh le-Rosh Har Sinai (introduction)
- Yom Zeh Horid (pizmon preceding the commands)
- Yaḥid Nora 'Alilah (pizmon between the commands and interdictions)

Isaac also wrote Paḥadti mi-Yoẓeri and Yom Zeh Mekapper le-Shabim, both in three-line strophes, the latter with signature and alphabet. Rapoport also attributes to Isaac the works Ayumati Yonah, ahabah for the Sabbath before the Feast of Weeks, and Yaḳush be-'Onyo, ge'ullah for the fifth Sabbath after Pesaḥ, but other scholars dispute whether these works were created by Isaac.
