= Isaac Halberstam =

Isaac Halberstam (1810–1880) was the father of Solomon Joachim Halberstam and author of Siaḥ Yiẓḥaḳ (or Siach Yitzchak) Lemberg, 1882, which contains insights on the Pentateuch and notices on the genealogy of the Halberstam family, published after his death by his son. Isaac was a prominent merchant who devoted his leisure time to study.
