= Kuzari =

Book by Judah Halevi

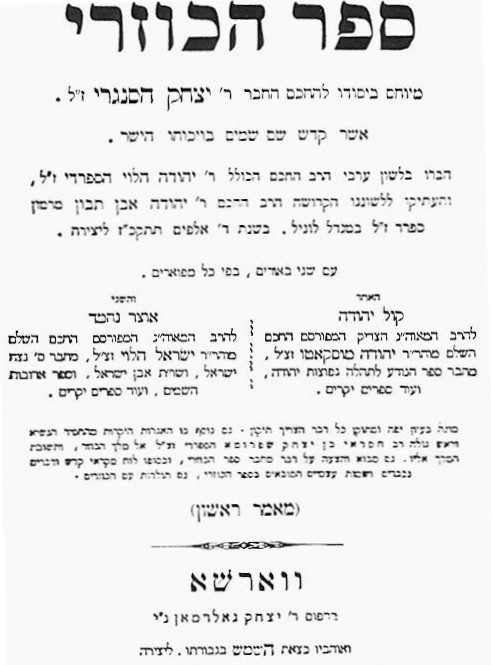
- Cover of the 1880 Hebrew language Warsaw edition of the Kuzari. Although the rabbi in the Kuzari is not named, the cover makes reference to Yitzhak ha-Sangari.
- Author: Judah Halevi
- Original title: כתאב אלרד ואלדליל פי אלדין אלדׄליל (in Judeo-Arabic)

The Kuzari, full title Book of Refutation and Proof on Behalf of the Despised Religion (Judeo-Arabic: כתאב אלרד ואלדליל פי אלדין אלדׄליל; Arabic: كتاب الحجة والدليل في نصرة الدين الذليل: Kitâb al-ḥujja wa'l-dalîl fi naṣr al-dîn al-dhalîl), also known as the Book of the Khazar (Hebrew: ספר הכוזרי: Sefer ha-Kuzari), is one of the most famous works of the medieval Spanish Jewish philosopher, physician, and poet Judah Halevi, completed in the Hebrew year 4900 (1139-40 CE).

Originally written in Arabic, prompted by Halevi's contact with a Spanish Karaite, it was then translated by numerous scholars, including Judah ben Saul ibn Tibbon, into Hebrew and other languages, and is regarded as one of the most important apologetic works of Jewish philosophy. Divided into five parts (ma'amarim "articles"), it takes the form of a dialogue between a rabbi and the king of the Khazars, who has invited the former to instruct him in the tenets of Judaism in comparison with those of the other two Abrahamic religions: Christianity and Islam.

== Historical foundation ==
The Kuzari takes place during the conversion of a Khazar king and some Khazar nobles to Judaism. The historicity of the event is debated. The Khazar Correspondence, along with other historical documents, are said to indicate a conversion of the Khazar royalty and nobility to Judaism. A minority of scholars, among them Moshe Gil and Shaul Stampfer, have challenged the document's claim to represent a real historical event. The scale of conversions within the Khazar Khaganate (if, indeed, any occurred) is unknown.

== Influence of the Kuzari ==
The Kuzari's emphasis on the uniqueness of the Jewish people, the Torah, and the land of Israel bears witness to a radical change of direction in Jewish thinking at that juncture in history, which coincided with the Crusades. Setting aside the possible exception of the work of Maimonides, it had a profound impact on the subsequent development of Judaism, and has remained central to Jewish religious tradition.

Given what has been generally regarded as its pronounced anti-philosophical tendencies, a direct line has been drawn, prominently by Gershom Scholem, between it and the rise of the anti-rationalist Kabbalah movement.

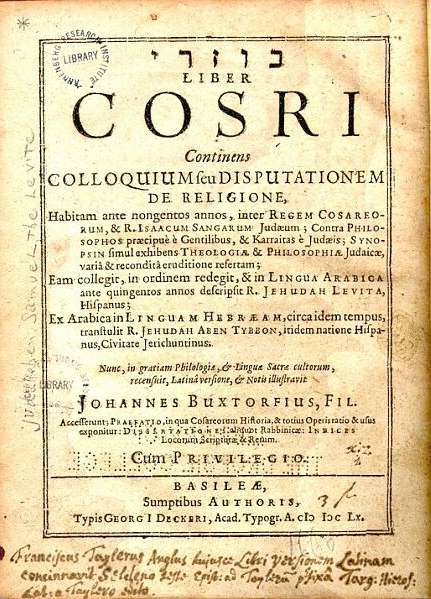
Cover of the 1660 Latin language Buxtorf edition of the Kuzari.

The ideas and style of the work played an important role in debates within the Haskalah (Jewish Enlightenment) movement.

Halevi claims that the knowledge of the Greeks and Romans had actually originated with Solomon and the ancient Hebrews and had then made their way via the Persians, Medians, and Chaldeans, their origin forgotten.

== Translations ==
In addition to the 12th-century Hebrew translation by Judah ben Saul ibn Tibbon, which passed through eleven printed editions (1st ed. Fano, 1506), another (albeit less successful) Hebrew rendering was made by Judah ben Isaac Cardinal at the beginning of the 13th century. Only portions of latter translation have survived.

In 1887, the text was published in its original Arabic for the first time by Hartwig Hirschfeld; in 1977, an Arabic critical translation was published by David H. Baneth. Parallel to his Arabic edition, Hirschfeld also published a critical edition of the Ibn Tibbon translation of the text that was based upon six medieval manuscripts. In 1885, Hirschfeld published the first German translation, and in 1905 his English translation appeared. In 1972, the first modern translation, by Yehudah Even-Shemuel, into Modern Hebrew from the Arabic original was published. In 1994, a French translation by Charles Touati from the Arabic original was published. In 1997, a Hebrew translation by Rabbi Yosef Qafih from the Arabic original was published, which is now in its fourth edition (published in 2013). A 2009 English translation by Rabbi N. Daniel Korobkin is in print by Feldheim Publishers.

== Contents ==
=== First essay ===
==== Introduction ====
After a short account of the incidents preceding the king's conversion and of his conversations with a philosopher, a Christian, and a Muslim concerning their respective beliefs, a rabbi appears in the discussion. His first statement startles the king, for instead of giving him proofs of the existence of God, he asserts and explains the miracles performed by God in favor of the Israelites.

The king expresses his astonishment at this exordium, which seems to him incoherent. The rabbi replies that the existence of God, the creation of the world, and other doctrines taught by the Jewish religion do not need any speculative demonstrations. Further, he presents the principle upon which his religious system is founded: that revealed religion is far superior to natural religion. The aim of ethical self-cultivation, which is the object of religion, is not to create in humans good intentions but to cause them to perform good deeds. This aim cannot be attained by philosophy, which is undecided about the nature of good, but can be secured by a religious education and life, which teaches what is good. As science is the sum of all truth found by successive generations, so religious training is based upon a set of traditions; in other words, history is an important factor in the development of human culture and science.

==== Creatio ex nihilo ====
Halevi writes that, as the Jews are the only depositaries of a written history of the development of the human race from the beginning of the world, the superiority of their traditions cannot be denied. Halevi asserts that no comparison is possible between Jewish culture, which in his view is based upon religious truth, and Greek culture, which is based upon science only. He holds that the wisdom of Greek philosophy lacked the divine support with which the Israelite prophets were endowed. Had a trustworthy tradition that the world was created out of nothing been known to Aristotle, he would have supported it by at least as strong arguments as those advanced by him to prove the eternity of matter. However, belief in the eternity of matter is not absolutely contrary to Jewish religious ideas: the biblical narrative of the Creation refers only to the beginning of the human race, and does not preclude the possibility of preexistent matter.

Still, relying upon tradition, Judaism assumes creatio ex nihilo, the theological position that the universe was created from nothing by a divine act. This assumption can be supported by compelling philosophical and theological arguments, which are comparable in strength to those favoring the concept of the eternity of matter—an idea proposing that the universe has no beginning and has existed infinitely in time. The objection that an absolutely perfect and infinite God could not have produced imperfect and finite beings—made by the Neoplatonists to the principle of creatio ex nihilo—is not removed by attributing the existence of all mundane things to the action of nature; for the latter is only a link in the chain of causes having its origin in the First Cause, which is God.

==== Superiority of his faith ====
Halevi then attempts to demonstrate the superiority of Judaism. The preservation of the Israelites in Egypt and in the wilderness, God's revelation of the Torah on Mount Sinai, and Israel's later history are, to him, evident proofs of its superiority. He impresses upon the king that the favor of God can be won only by following God's precepts in their totality, and that those precepts are binding only on Jews. The question of why the Jews were favored with God's instruction is answered in the Kuzari in line 95 of chapter 1: it was based upon their being descended from Adam, God's first child, who was perfect. Later, Noah's most pious son was Shem. His most pious son was Arpachshad. Abraham was Arpachshad's descendant, Isaac was Abraham's most pious son, and Jacob was Isaac's most pious son. The sons of Jacob were all worthy, and their children became the Jews. The rabbi then shows (chapter 1:109–121) that the immortality of the soul, resurrection, reward, and punishment are all denoted in the Hebrew Bible and referred to in Jewish writings.

=== Second essay ===
==== Question of attributes ====
In the second essay, Halevi enters into a detailed discussion of some of the theological questions hinted at in the preceding one. To these belong, in the first place, those of the divine attributes. Halevi rejects entirely the doctrine of essential attributes, which had been propounded by Saadia Gaon and Bahya ibn Paquda. For him, there is no difference between essential and other attributes. Either the attribute affirms a quality in God, in which case essential attributes cannot be applied to him more than can any other, because it is impossible to predicate anything of him, or the attribute expresses only the negation of the contrary quality, and in that case, there is no harm in using any kind of attributes. Accordingly, Halevi divides all the attributes found in the Hebrew Bible into three classes: active, relative, and negative, which last class comprises all the essential attributes expressing mere negations.

Halevi enters into a lengthy discussion on the question of attributes being closely connected with that of anthropomorphism. Although opposed to the conception of God's corporeality as contrary to Jewish scripture, he would consider it wrong to reject all the sensuous concepts of anthropomorphism, as there is something in these ideas which fills the human soul with the awe of God.

The remainder of the essay comprises dissertations on the following subjects: the excellence of Israel, the land of prophecy, which is to other countries what the Jews are to other nations; the sacrifices; the arrangement of the Tabernacle, which, according to Halevi, symbolizes the human body; the prominent spiritual position occupied by Israel, whose relation to other nations is that of the heart to the limbs; the opposition evinced by Judaism toward asceticism, in virtue of the principle that the favor of God is to be won only by carrying out his precepts, and that these precepts do not command humans to subdue the inclinations suggested by the faculties of the soul, but to use them in their due place and proportion; and the excellence of the Hebrew language, which, although sharing now the fate of the Jews, is to other languages what the Jews are to other nations and what Israel is to other lands.

=== Third essay: The oral tradition ===
The third essay is devoted to the refutation of the teachings of Karaism and to the history of the development of the oral tradition in the Mishnah and Talmud. Halevi shows that there is no means of carrying out the precepts without having recourse to oral tradition; that such tradition has always existed may be inferred from many passages of the Hebrew Bible, the very reading of which is dependent upon it, since there were no vowels or accents in the original text.

=== Fourth essay: Names of God ===
The fourth essay opens with an analysis of the various names of God found in the Hebrew Bible. According to Halevi, all these names, with the exception of the Tetragrammaton, are attributes expressing the various states of God's activity in the world. The multiplicity of names no more implies a multiplicity in his essence than do the multifarious influences of the rays of the sun on various bodies imply a multiplicity of suns. To the prophet's intuitive vision, the actions proceeding from God appear under the images of the corresponding human actions. Angels are God's messengers, either existing for a long time or created only for special purposes.

Halevi shifts from discussing God's names and the nature of angels to emphasizing that the prophets offer a more genuine understanding of God than philosophers do. While he shows deep respect for the Sefer Yetzirah—quoting many passages from it—he quickly clarifies that Abraham's ideas were held by the patriarch before God revealed himself to him. The essay ends with examples of ancient Hebrew knowledge in astronomy and medicine.

=== Fifth essay: Arguments against philosophy ===
The fifth and last essay is devoted to a criticism of the various philosophical systems known at the time of the author. Halevi attacks by turns Aristotelian cosmology, psychology, and metaphysics. To the doctrine of emanation, based, according to him, upon the Aristotelian cosmological principle that no simple being can produce a compound being, he objects in the form of the following query: "Why did the emanation stop at the lunar sphere? Why should each intelligence think only of itself and of that from which it issued and thus give birth to one emanation, thinking not at all of the preceding intelligences, and thereby losing the power to give birth to many emanations?"

He argues against the theory of Aristotle that the soul of humankind is in its mind and that only the souls of philosophers will be united—after the death of their bodies—with the active intellect. "Is there," he asks, "any curriculum of the knowledge one has to acquire to win immortality? How is it that the soul of one man differs from that of another? How can one forget a thing once thought of?" and many other questions of the kind. He shows himself especially severe against the Motekallamin, whose arguments on the creation of the world, on God, and his unity he terms dialectic exercises and mere phrases.

However, Halevi is against limiting philosophical speculation to matters concerning creation and God; he follows the Greek philosophers in examining the creation of the material world. Thus, he admits that every being is made up of matter and form. The movement of celestial spheres formed the sphere of the elements, from the fusion of which all beings were created. This fusion, which varied according to climate, gave to matter the potentiality to receive from God a variety of forms: from the mineral, which is the lowest in the scale of creation, to humankind, which is the highest because of its possessing, in addition to the qualities of the mineral, vegetable, and animal, a hylic intellect that is influenced by the active intellect. This hylic intellect, which forms the rational soul, is a spiritual substance, not an accident, and therefore imperishable.

Discussions concerning the soul and its faculties naturally lead to the question of free will. Halevi upholds the doctrine of free will against the Epicurean and the Fatalist and endeavors to reconcile it with the belief in God's providence and omniscience.

== Commentaries on the book ==
Six commentaries were printed in the fifteenth century, of which four are known. All were written in Hebrew:

- Edut LeYisrael (עדות לישראל, 'Witness to Yisrael') by Rabbi Shlomo ben Menachem. (This commentary is lost.)
- Kol Yehudah (קול יהודה, 'Voice of Yehudah') by Rabbi Judah Moscato.

Commentaries by two students of Rabbi Shlomo ben Menachem: Rabbi Yaakov ben Parisol and Rabbi Netanel ben Nechemya Hacaspi.

In the 20th century, two more commentaries were written, including:

- The Kuzari – Commentary by Rabbi Shlomo Aviner (four volumes).
- The Explained Kuzari by Rabbi David Cohen (three volumes).

== Bibliography ==
- Yehuda ha-Levi. Kuzari. Translated by N. Daniel Korobkin as The Kuzari: In Defense of the Despised Faith. Northvale, N.J.: Jason Aronson, 1998. 2nd Edition (revised) published Jerusalem: Feldheim Publishers, 2009. (ISBN 978-1-58330-842-4)
- Yechezkel Sarna. Rearrangement of the Kuzari., Transl. Rabbi Avraham Davis. New York: Metsudah, 1986
- Adam Shear. The Kuzari and the shaping of Jewish identity, 1167–1900. Cambridge, New York: Cambridge University Press, 2008 ISBN 978-0-521-88533-1
- D. M. Dunlop. History of the Jewish Khazars. Princeton: Princeton University Press, 1954.
- Leo Strauss. "The Law of Reason in the Kuzari" in: Proceedings of the American Academy for Jewish Research, XIII (1943), pp. 47–96.
