= Poliudie =

Form of tribute

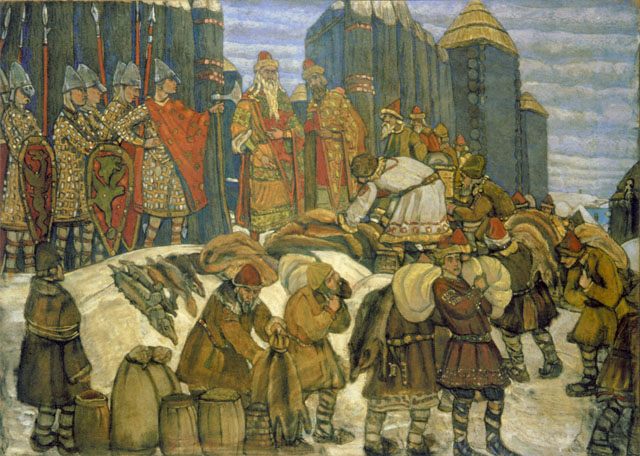
Gathering Tribute by Nicholas Roerich (1908)

The poliudie (Note: Russian: полюдье, romanized: polyudye.) or poliudia (Note: Ukrainian: полюддя, romanized: poliuddia.) was the practice by which the rulers of Kievan Rus' collected tribute from their East Slavic subjects. From the 12th to 16th centuries, the term came to denote a fixed tax levied on the population.

== History ==
The poliudie (Greek: πολύδια) is described in detail in Chapter 9 of De Administrando Imperio, written by the Byzantine emperor Constantine Porphyrogenitus in the mid-10th century. It says:

when the month of November begins, their [Rus'] chiefs together with all the Russians at once leave Kiev and go off on the "poliudie" which means "rounds," that is to the Slavonic regions of the Veverians and Drugovichians and Krivichians and Severians and the rest of the Slavs who are tributaries of the Russians.

— De Administrando Imperio

Some paid tribute in money, some in furs or other commodities, and some in slaves. It lasted from November to April. The practice was also described in the accounts of Arab geographers of the 10th–11th centuries, who drew on information dating back to the second half of the 9th century. It was similar to the "right of hospitality" as practised in the Viking lands (where it was known as veizla) and early medieval Poland (where it was known as stan). Some historians, such as Yuri Kobishchanov, have interpreted the poliudie as part of a broader phenomenon in world history.

The Primary Chronicle also describes the process without explicitly using the term poliudie. The druzhina originally collected tribute from the subjects. In 12th-century sources, princes are also mentioned as dealing with judicial, administrative, and economic matters during those tours. The chronicle reports that Olga of Kiev changed the method of gathering tribute after her husband, Igor, was killed by the Drevlians in 945, who were angered at his attempt to collect more tribute than it had been agreed. As a result, the procedure probably began to be regulated as early as the 10th century. The princes could delegate the right to collect these dues to their officials and local agents, leading to the transformation of the poliudie into a regular tax. This practice of "living off the land" was replaced with collection of dues at stations known as pogosty. In sources dating to the 12th–16th centuries, the poliudie is also referred to as a dar ("gift") or darovnoye, and during this period, it was usually commuted into payments in furs or money. It is mentioned as being found in all of the Russian principalities, including the Novgorod Republic.

== Sources ==
- Gonneau, Pierre (30 November 2022). "Russia from the Mongol invasion to the death of Ivan the Terrible (1242–1584)". In Menjot, Denis; Caesar, Mathieu; Garnier, Florent; Pijuan, Pere Verdés (eds.). The Routledge Handbook of Public Taxation in Medieval Europe. Taylor & Francis. pp. 372–388. doi:10.4324/9781003023838-19. ISBN 978-1-000-73636-6.
- Stefanovich, P. S. (2015). "Полюдье". In Kravets, S. L. (ed.). Большая российская энциклопедия. Том 27: Полупроводники — Пустыня (in Russian). Большая российская энциклопедия. p. 71. ISBN 978-5-85270-364-4. Archived from the original on 12 November 2024.
