= Igor of Kiev =

Prince of Kiev from 912 to 945

Igor
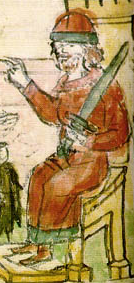
- Igor in the Radziwiłł Chronicle, 15th century

Prince of Kiev
- Reign: 912–945
- Predecessor: Oleg
- Successor: Sviatoslav I

Prince of Novgorod
- Reign: 879–945
- Predecessor: Rurik
- Successor: Sviatoslav I
- Regent: Oleg (879–912)
- Born: c. 877
- Died: 945; Iskorosten
- Spouse: Olga
- Issue: Sviatoslav I
- Dynasty: Rurik
- Father: Rurik

Igor (Church Slavonic: Игорь; (Note: Russian: Игорь Рюрикович; Ukrainian: Ігор Рюрикович, romanized: Ihor Riurykovych) Old Norse: Ingvarr; c. 877 – 945) was Prince of Kiev from 912 to 945. Traditionally, he is considered to be the son of Rurik, who established himself at Novgorod and died in 879 while Igor was an infant. According to the Primary Chronicle, Rurik was succeeded by Oleg, who ruled as regent and was described by the chronicler as being "of his kin".

== Life ==
Information about Igor comes mostly from the Primary Chronicle, which states that Igor was the son of Rurik:

6378–6387 (870–879). On his deathbed, Rurik bequeathed his realm to Oleg, who belonged to his kin, and entrusted to Oleg's hands his son Igor', for he was very young.

6388–6390 (880–882). Oleg set forth, taking with him many warriors from among the Varangians, the Chuds, the Slavs, the Merians and all the Krivichians. He thus arrived with his Krivichians before Smolensk, captured the city, and set up a garrison there. Thence he went on and captured Lyubech, where he also set up a garrison. He then came to the hills of Kiev, and saw how Askold and Dir reigned there. He hid his warriors in the boats, left some others behind, and went forward himself bearing the child Igor'. He thus came to the foot of the Hungarian hill, and after concealing his troops, he sent messengers to Askold and Dir, representing himself as a stranger on his way to Greece on an errand for Oleg and for Igor', the prince's son, and requesting that they should come forth to greet them as members of their race. Askold and Dir straightway came forth. Then all the soldiery jumped out of the boats, and Oleg said to Askold and Dir, "You are not princes nor even of princely stock, but I am of princely birth." Igor' was then brought forward, and Oleg announced that he was the son of Rurik. They killed Askold and Dir, and after carrying them to the hill, they buried them there, on the hill now known as Hungarian, where the castle of Ol'ma now stands.

Little is known about him between the years 912 and 941 due to a gap in the chronicle record.

Igor twice besieged Constantinople, in 941 and 944, and although Greek fire destroyed part of his fleet, he concluded a favourable treaty with the Byzantine Emperor Constantine VII (945), the text of which the chronicle has preserved. In 913 and 944, the Rus' plundered the Arabs in the Caspian Sea during the Caspian expeditions of the Rus', but it remains unclear whether Igor had anything to do with these campaigns.

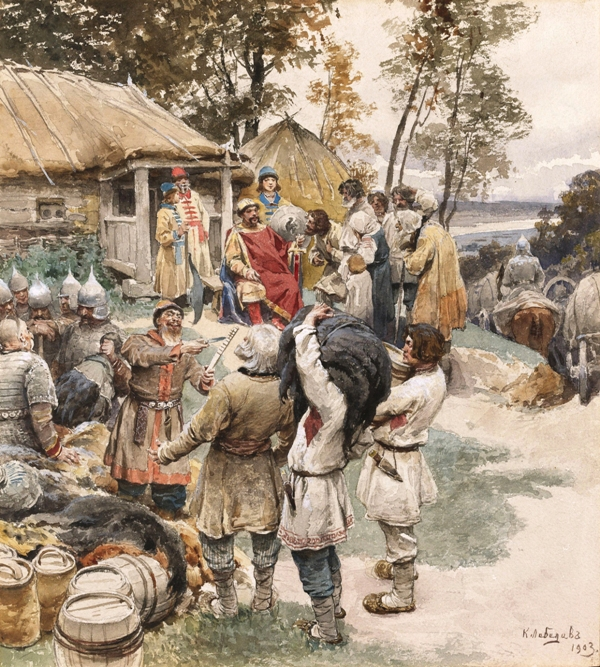
Prince Igor Exacting Tribute from the Drevlyans, by Klavdiy Lebedev (1852–1916).

Igor was killed while collecting tribute from the Drevlians in 945. The Byzantine historian and chronicler Leo the Deacon (born c. 950) describes how Igor met his death: "They had bent down two birch trees to the prince's feet and tied them to his legs; then they let the trees straighten again, thus tearing the prince's body apart." Igor's widow Olga avenged his death by punishing the Drevlians. The Primary Chronicle blames his death on his own excessive greed, indicating that he tried to collect tribute for a second time in a month. As a result, Olga changed the system of tribute gathering (poliudie) in what may be regarded as the first legal reform recorded in Eastern Europe.

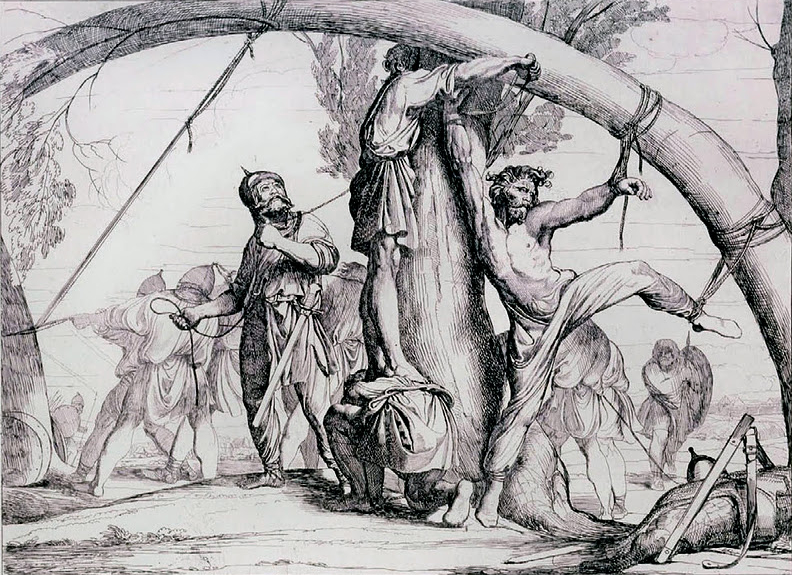
Igor's death as imagined by Fyodor Bruni

== Historiography ==
Drastically revising the chronology of the Primary Chronicle, Constantin Zuckerman argues that Igor actually reigned for three years, between summer 941 and his death in early 945. Zuckerman argues that the 33-year reign attributed to Igor in the Chronicle is the result of its author's faulty interpretation of Byzantine sources. Indeed, none of Igor's activities recorded in the Chronicle is dated before 941.

Referring to the Ioachim Chronicle, Vasily Tatishchev argues that the Swedish princess Efanda, whose existence has been questioned by many historians, was Igor's mother. According to Tatishchev, the name "Ingor" comes from the Finnish (Izhora) name Inger. Tatishchev also gives Igor's birth dates from various manuscripts: 875 in the Schismatic manuscript, 861 in the Nizhny Novgorod manuscript, 865 in the Orenburg manuscript.

According to Olof von Dalin, another Igor had land in Sweden and was a frequent guest in Rus'. He was coregent with Eric Anundsson and had land in Västergötland which he had inherited from his father. After his reign, Eric Anundsson became the sole ruler of the Swedish mainland. Igor also aided Eric when Norwegians under Harald Fairhair raided the Baltic coast. Harald Fairhair lost his son Halfdan the White in a siege of a Swedish fortification in the Baltic. Thanks to Igor Olofsson's help the attack on the Baltic fortifications was thwarted. Igor also took part in a Viking raid on Brittany in 931 described in Frankish chronicles as Incon. This Igor was the son of Olof (Swedish king 852). Igor Olofsson led a Swedish expedition helping Igor Ruriksson in his war against the Byzantines. Igor and Igor were related.

== Sources ==
- Katchanovski, Ivan; Kohut, Zenon E.; Nesebio, Bohdan Y.; Yurkevich, Myroslav (2013). Historical Dictionary of Ukraine. Lanham, Maryland; Toronto; Plymouth: Scarecrow Press. p. 992. ISBN 9780810878471.

Igor of Kiev Rurikovich Born: 9th century Died: 945
Regnal titles
Preceded by Oleg	Prince of Kiev; 914–945	Succeeded by Olga as regent
