= Rus'–Byzantine Treaty (911) =

911 treaty between Kievan Rus' and Byzantine Empire

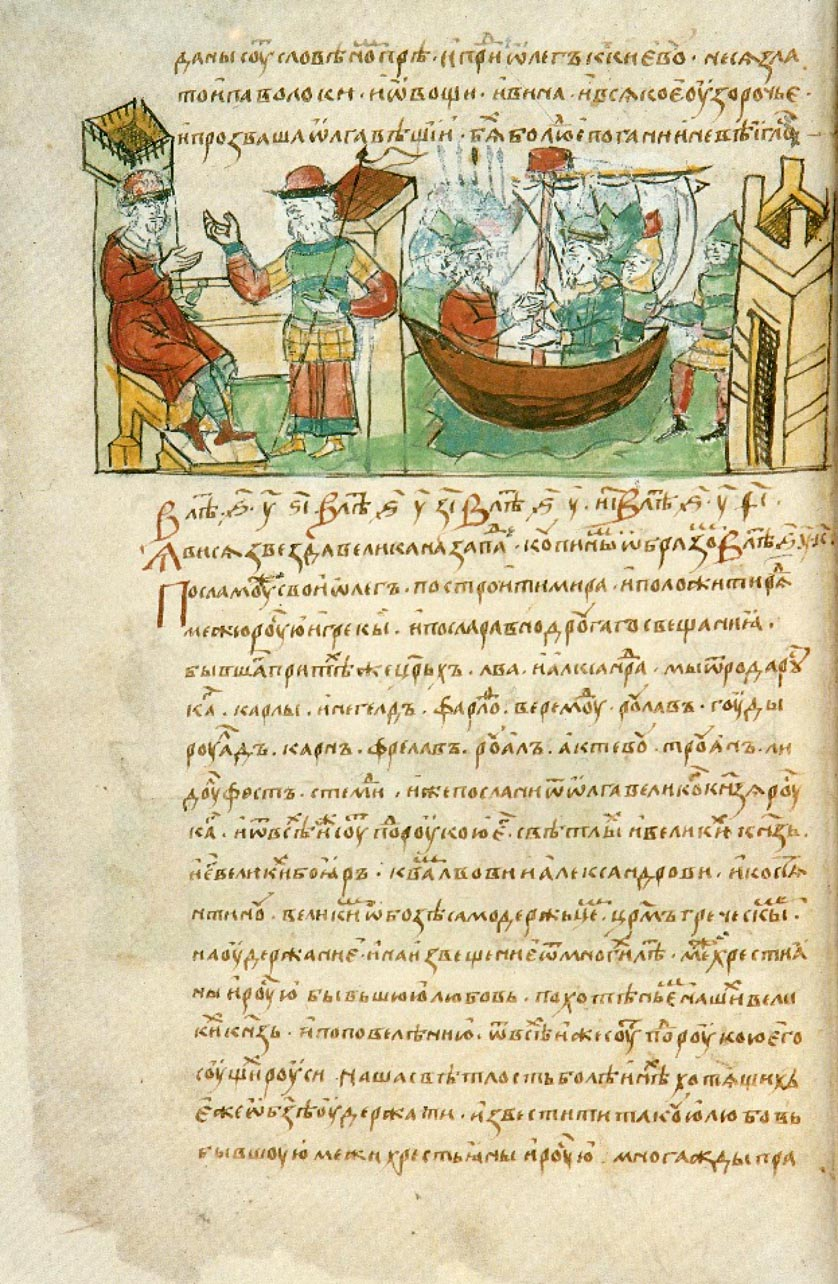
Fragment of the 911 Rus'–Byzantine Treaty as preserved in the 15th-century Radziwiłł Chronicle

The Rus'–Byzantine Treaty of 911 is the most comprehensive and detailed treaty which was allegedly concluded between the Byzantine Empire and Kievan Rus' in the early 10th century. It was preceded by the preliminary treaty of 907. It is considered the earliest written source of Kievan Rus' law. The text of this treaty is only found in the Primary Chronicle (PVL), and its authenticity is therefore difficult to establish.

== Contents ==
The text of the document is incorporated into the Primary Chronicle (PVL) sub anno 911. The text also includes speeches of the parties on the occasion.

- The treaty opens with a lengthy enumeration of the Rus' envoys.
- Article 1 proclaims the "solid and durable" friendship between Rus' and Greeks, and provides that the Rus' will never cause any damage to the Greeks and vice-versa.
- The articles 3 to 7 regulate criminal law and the life of their colony at Constantinople. There is also a proviso on inheritance of a merchant who died in the imperial capital.
- The article 8 is dedicated to maritime law.
- The following articles enlarge on ransom of captives, exchange of criminals, and the status of the Varangian mercenaries in Byzantine service.

== Analysis ==
=== Authenticity and historical context ===
Because the text of this treaty is only found in the Primary Chronicle (PVL), it is difficult to authenticate. Some scholars believe that the original text of the treaty was written in Medieval Greek, then translated into (Old) Church Slavonic, after which the Greek original was lost. Cross & Sherbowitz-Wetzor (1930) wrote about the earliest treaties in general:

The textual and archival history of the treaties of 907, 912, 945, and 971 is completely obscure, and it has never been satisfactorily determined whether the copies preserved in the Povest' represent Old-Russian texts of the treaties made when they were negotiated, or whether they are translations afterward prepared from Greek originals which subsequently came to light in Kiev itself. It is not likely that the Russian [sic] princes of the tenth century, who were by no means superior to Scandinavian freebooters elsewhere on the Continent, attached any grave significance to these scraps of paper, and the fact that there is but one Greek allusion to them would indicate that to the Byzantine authorities they were more a gesture than a contract. The obscurity, the grammatical uncertainty, and the general disregard of style shown by these treaty-texts lead to the conclusion that they were translated at a moment when they had no further value except as casual relics of the past.'

Serhii Plokhy (2006) compared the surviving texts of the supposed Rusʹ–Byzantine treaties of 907, 911 and 944, noting that 'there is serious doubt that the dates attached to the texts of these treaties are reliable. Indeed, there is good reason to believe that the treaties are at least partly the result of later creative editing of original texts, either by the author of the Primary Chronicle or by his predecessors. For example, the text of the Rus' treaty of 911 with Byzantium, which is considered more reliable than the other two, does not include a list of Rus' towns', unlike those of 907 and 944.

The text has many affinities in content and phrasing with the trade treaties later concluded by Byzantium with the merchant republics of Italy. No treaties of comparable complexity and antiquity are known among the other societies in Europe of that time.

=== Linguistics ===
It was composed in two languages and signed personally by Emperor Leo VI the Wise.

All the names of the Rus' envoys mentioned in the treaty appear to be Scandinavian (attested or reconstructed Old Norse forms in parentheses): Farlof (Farulfr), Ver/lemud (Vermu(n)dr), Rulav (Rollabʀ), Fost (*Fastuʀ), Frelavc (Frilleifr), Inegeld (Ingjaldr), Karly (Karli), Karn (Karna, attested in a Swedish runic inscription), Lidul(f) (Lidulif < Leiðulfr, but litulf is attested from a runic inscription), Ruald (Hróaldr), Rjuar (Hróarr), Truan (Þróndr or Þrandr). Cross & Sherbowitz-Wetzor (1930) observed: 'In the portion of the account of Oleg's expedition which is of native Russian origin the Varangians and the Slavs are clearly distinguished, but in the treaty text itself the whole expedition is designated as Russian.'

Apart from the chronology at the start of the PVL (18:10–12), the Treaty of 911 is the only place in the PVL where Oleg is referred to as a кънязя k"nyazya "prince". If this is accurate, then Oleg would have to have been a prince in his own right (suo jure). On the other hand, Oleg reportedly told Askold and Dir that he was роду къняжа rodu k"nyazha "of princely stock/lineage" (PVL 23:14–16), instead of a prince himself, when he is said to have killed them and taken over Kiev in 881/2. At Rurik's death, the PVL only calls Oleg his "kinsman", given the care of Rurik's son Igor, and acting as a regent on Igor's behalf, rather than being a prince in his own right.

== See also ==
- Trade route from the Varangians to the Greeks

== Bibliography ==
=== Primary sources ===
- (in Church Slavonic) Повесть временных лет, ч. 1–2, М.—Л., 1950.
- Cross, Samuel Hazzard; Sherbowitz-Wetzor, Olgerd P. (1930). The Russian Primary Chronicle, Laurentian Text. Translated and edited by Samuel Hazzard Cross and Olgerd P. Sherbowitz-Wetzor (1930) (PDF). Cambridge, Massachusetts: The Mediaeval Academy of America. p. 325.
  - Cross, Samuel Hazzard; Sherbowitz-Wetzor, Olgerd P. (2013) [1953]. SLA 218. Ukrainian Literature and Culture. Excerpts from The Rus' Primary Chronicle (Povest vremennykh let, PVL) (PDF). Toronto: Electronic Library of Ukrainian Literature, University of Toronto. p. 16. Archived from the original (PDF) on 30 May 2014.
- Ostrowski, Donald; Birnbaum, David J. (7 December 2014). "Rus' primary chronicle critical edition – Interlinear line-level collation". pvl.obdurodon.org (in Church Slavic). Archived from the original on 28 April 2025.

=== Literature ===
- Bandle, Oscar (2008). The Nordic Languages. Volume 1. Walter de Gruyter. p. 1041. ISBN 9783110197051.
- Jakobsson, Sverrir, The Varangians: In God’s Holy Fire (Palgrave Macmillan, 2020), pp. 38–41. ISBN 978-3-030-53797-5
- Dimnik, Martin (January 2004). "The Title "Grand Prince" in Kievan Rus'". Mediaeval Studies. 66: 253–312. doi:10.1484/J.MS.2.306512.
- Lind, John H (2004). "Varangians in Europe's Eastern and Northern Periphery". Ennen & NYT (4).
- Ostrowski, Donald (2018). "Was There a Riurikid Dynasty in Early Rus'?". Canadian-American Slavic Studies. 52 (1): 30–49. doi:10.1163/22102396-05201009.
- Plokhy, Serhii (2006). The Origins of the Slavic Nations: Premodern Identities in Russia, Ukraine, and Belarus (PDF). New York: Cambridge University Press. pp. 10–15. ISBN 978-0-521-86403-9.
- (in Russian) Uspensky, Fyodor. The History of the Byzantine Empire, vol. 2. Moscow: Mysl, 1997.
- (in Russian) Zimin, Aleksandr, Memorials of Russian Law. Issue 1: Memorials of Law of Kievan State 10th-12th centuries / . Moscow, 1952. (Памятники русского права. Вып. 1: Памятники права Киевского государства X–XII вв. / Сост. А.А. Зимин. М., 1952).
