= Constantin Zuckerman =

French historian

Constantin Zuckerman (French pronunciation: [kɔ̃stɑ̃tɛ̃ zykɛʁmɑ̃]; born 1957) is a French historian and Professor of Byzantine studies at the Ecole Pratique des Hautes Etudes in Paris.

== Biography ==
Zuckerman is a professor at the Ecole Pratique des Hautes Etudes in Paris, which is part of the PSL network in France. He previously served as Director and Deputy Director of the Centre for History and Civilization of Byzantium, Collège de France and is currently the Chair of Institutions et diplomatie de l'Empire byzantin.

He completed his doctorate in 1994 under the direction of Gilbert Dagron on the topic of "Recherches sur le statut social des soldats sous le Bas-Empire et à l'époque protobyzantine."

Zuckerman is the author of numerous articles about the Byzantine Empire, the Goths, the Armenians, the Huns, the Turkic peoples, the Khazars, the Magyars and the early Rus, among other peoples. In "On the Date of the Khazars' Conversion to Judaism and the Chronology of the Kings of the Rus Oleg and Igor," Zuckerman used Khazar and Slavic documents (Khazar Correspondence, Schechter Letter and The Life of Cyril) to call into question the traditional dates for early Kievan Rus leaders. In the same article he asserted that the Khazars converted to Judaism in 861, during the visit of Saint Cyril.

Zuckerman is the editor of the Travaux et Mémoires annual volume, which was created by Paul Lemerle and continued by Gilbert Dagron.

== Awards ==
In 2005, the Académie des Inscriptions et Belles Lettres awarded Zuckerman the Charles Diehl prize for his monograph, Du village à l’Empire: autour du registre fiscal d’Aphroditô (525/526).

== Bibliography ==
- La Crimee entre Byzance et le Khaganat khazar. Ed. Constantin Zuckerman. Paris: Association des Amis du Centre d'Histoire et Civilisation de Byzance, 2006. 197 pp.
- Zuckerman, Constantin. (2002) "Heraclius in 625" (Journal Article in Revue des études Byzantines)
- Zuckerman, Constantin. (2002) On the Origin of the Khazar Diarchy and the Circumstances of Khazaria's Conversion to Judaism (Book Chapter in The Turks, Volume 1: Early Ages)
- Zuckerman, Constantin. Les centres proto-urbains russes entre Scandinavie, Byzance et Orient / eds. M. Kazanski, A. Nercessian, C. Zuckerman (Réalités Byzantines 7). - Paris, 2000. - Р. 95-120.
- Zuckerman, Constantin. (2000) "Review of 'Rome and Persia at War, 502-532' by G. Greatrex" (Book Review in Revue des études Byzantines)
- Zuckerman, Constantin. (1998) Two reforms of the 370s: recruiting soldiers and senators in the divided empire (Journal Article in Revue des études Byzantines )
- Zuckerman, Constantin. (1988) The Reign of Constantine V in the Miracles of St. Theodore the Recruit (Journal Article in Revue des études Byzantines)
- Zuckerman, Constantin. (1995) On the Date of the Khazars' Conversion to Judaism and the Chronology of the Kings of the Rus Oleg and Igor (Journal Article in Revue des études Byzantines )
- К. Цукерман, "Перестройка древнейшей русской истории", In: У истоков русской государственности, 2007, (materials of a 2005 conference)
