= Judah ben Barzillai =

12th-century Catalan talmudist and rabbi

Judah ben Barzillai (Albargeloni) was a Catalan Talmudist of the end of the 11th and the beginning of the 12th century. Almost nothing is known of his life. He came of a very distinguished family, on account of which he was not seldom called "ha-Nasi" (the prince), a title of honor borne also by his descendants in Barcelona.

It is very doubtful if Judah was a pupil of Isaac ben Reuben, as some have asserted; nor can the names of his own pupils, and whether Abraham ben Isaac of Lunel (RABaD II) was among them, be determined. It is certain that Abraham ben Isaac knew Judah personally and consulted him in difficult cases. Judah once had a controversy with his learned fellow citizen Abraham ben Ḥiyya. The latter, it seems, tried to postpone a wedding because the stars displayed unfavorable omens, while Judah held such a course to be contrary to law, since the regarding of omens is forbidden in the Scriptures.

== Works ==
Judah was one of the greatest codifiers of the Middle Ages. With the exception of a few fragments, his halakhic writings have been lost. However, they are often cited as authoritative by Rabad II, Isaac ben Abba Mari (for both of whom he is simply "HaRav," or "HaRav haMeḥabber"), Abraham ben David (RABaD III), and Zerahiah ben Isaac ha-Levi.

The works of Maimonides and Jacob ben Asher, published a century later, caused Judah's codex to be neglected, although individual scholars down to the 16th century made use of it. From quotations found in works of more than forty authors it is seen that Judah codified the whole law, ritual and civil. His Sefer haIttim, of which manuscript fragments exist, is cited by name. The fragments contain regulations for Shabbat, but the book originally included not only regulations for the Sabbath, festivals, and Rosh Chodesh, but also nearly all the material treated of in the first part of the Ṭur, and probably even more than this. Part of the Sefer haIttim is printed in Coronel's Zekher Natan. The part of the codex which deals with marriage laws and kindred topics is called by some Seder Nashim; by others, Yiḥus She'er Bosar. The civil law was contained in the Sefer ha-Dinim (so read by Halberstam instead of Sefer ha-Dayyanim), which was divided into five "gates," and the extent of which may be judged from that portion of it published as Sefer ha-Sheṭarot embracing 138 pages, and treating of the different forms of contracts according to rabbinical law.

Besides this halakhic work, Judah wrote a detailed commentary on the Sefer Yetzirah. Like most commentaries on Sefer Yetzirah, that by Judah helps little to an understanding of the text; on the contrary, it contains Judah's own rather diffuse, half-mystical, half-philosophical theological discussions. The author betrays an astonishing familiarity with the Talmudic-Midrashic literature, and gives extracts from works of the Geonim which are otherwise unknown.

Judah was acquainted with the philosophical writings of Saadia and of Samuel ben Hophni, but not with those of Solomon ibn Gabirol and Baḥya. He shows little talent for dealing with theological or philosophical subjects. He argues strenuously against the charge made by the Karaites that the Rabbis favored anthropomorphisms. The Sefer Yetzirah was first published by Halberstam in 1885 (Berlin).

A treatise on the preparation of Torah scrolls is attributed to Judah, but without sufficient reason. In his commentary to Sefer Yetzirah Judah mentions another of his own works, Zemanim, about which nothing further is known. To judge from certain allusions of Judah it would seem that he wrote a commentary also on the Bible; at any rate he had planned such a work.
