= Shaul Stampfer =

Researcher

- שאול שטמפפר
- Born: 1948 (age 77–78); Atlanta, United States
- Occupations: Historian, academic, author

Academic background
- Education: Yeshivat Har Etzion, Yeshiva University, Hebrew University of Jerusalem

Academic work
- Discipline: Jewish history and religion
- Sub-discipline: Jewish demography; Lithuanian yeshivas
- Institutions: Hebrew University

Shaul Stampfer (Hebrew: שאול שטמפפר; born 1948) is a researcher of East European Jewry specializing in Lithuanian yeshivas, Jewish demography, migration and education.

== Biography ==
Shaul Stampfer was born in Atlanta, Georgia, to a Jewish family, and is a descendant of Yehoshua Stampfer. He graduated from Lincoln High School in 1965 and moved to Israel in the 1970s. He received his BA from the Yeshiva University in 1970 and his Ph.D. from the Hebrew University of Jerusalem in 1982. He also studied at Yeshivat Har Etzion in Alon Shevut. Professor Stampfer currently resides in the Ramot neighborhood of Jerusalem.

== Academic career ==
In 1989–1992 Stampfer was head of the Institute for Jewish Studies in Moscow and helped to establish the city's Jewish University. Stampfer is currently a professor emeritus of Soviet and East European Jewry at the Hebrew University of Jerusalem. His book on Lithuanian yeshivas (published in Hebrew in 1995 and again in 2005) has been translated into English and published by the Littman Library of Jewish Civilization. His numerous articles have been published in a volume Families, rabbis and education: traditional Jewish society in nineteenth-century Eastern Europe, The Littman Library of Jewish Civilization, 2010 (also translated into Russian).

== Published works ==
- "The Pushke and Its Development," Cathedra 21 (Oct. 1981): 89–102 (in Hebrew).
- "The 1764 census of Polish Jewry," Bar-Ilan 24–25 (1989): 41–147.
- “The Geographical Background of East European Jewish Migration to the United States before World War I,” in Ira A. Glazier and Luigi De Rosa (eds.), Migration across Time and Nations: Population Mobility in Historical Contexts (New York & London, 1986), pp. 220–230.
- “Literacy Among East European Jewry in the Modern Period: Context, Background and Implications” in: S. Almog (ed.), Transition and Change in Modern Jewish History: Essays Presented in Honor of Shmuel Ettinger (Jerusalem, 1987), pp. 63–87 (in Hebrew).
- "The Social Implications of Very Early Marriage in Eastern Europe in the Nineteenth Century," in Ezra Mendelsohn and Chone Shmeruk (eds.), Studies on Polish Jewry: Paul Glikson Memorial Volume(Jerusalem 1987), pp. 65–77 (in Hebrew).
- "Heder Study, Knowledge of Torah, and the Maintenance of Social Stratification in Traditional East European Jewish Society," Studies in Jewish Education 3(1988): 271–289.
- "Remarriage Among Jews and Christians in Nineteenth-Century Eastern Europe," Jewish History 3,2(1988): 85–114.
- "L'amour et la famille chez les Juifs d'Europe orientale a l'epoque moderne," in Shmuel Trigano (ed.), La Societe Juive A Travers L'histoire, vol. 2 (Paris 1992), pp. 435–468.
- “Gender Differentiation and Education of the Jewish Woman in Nineteenth-Century Eastern Europe”, Polin 7 (1992): 459–483.
- “Patterns of Internal Jewish Migration in the Russian Empire,” in Yaacov Ro’i (ed.), Jews and Jewish Life in Russia and the Soviet Union (Ilford, 1995), pp. 28–47.
- "Dormitory and Yeshiva in Eastern Europe," in Religious Dormitory Education in Israel (Jerusalem 1997), pp. 15–28 (in Hebrew).
- "Hungarian Yeshivot, Lithuanian Yeshivot and Josef Ben David," Jewish History 11,1(1997): 131–141.
- "The 1764 Census of Lithuanian Jewry and What It Can Teach Us," Papers in Jewish Demography 1993 (Jerusalem 1997) pp. 91–121.
- "Aspects of Population Growth and Migration in Polish-Lithuanian Jewry in the Modern Period," in The Broken Chain / Polish Jewry Through the Ages (Jerusalem 1997) (in Hebrew).
- "Jewish Population Patterns in Pre-Partition Lithuania and Some of Their Implications," Scripta Hierosolymitana 38(1998)/ Studies in the History of the Jews in Old Poland in honor of Jacob Goldberg, pp. 189–223.
- “What Happened to the Extended Jewish Family? Jewish Homes for the Aged in Eastern Europe,” Studies in Contemporary Jewry XIV (1998): 128–142.
- “Hasidic Yeshivot in Inter-War Poland”, Polin 11(1998): 3–24.
- "What actually happened to the Jews of Ukraine in 1648?" Jewish History 17,2 (2003): 207–227.
- Families, rabbis and education: traditional Jewish society in nineteenth-century Eastern Europe, Oxford: The Littman Library of Jewish Civilization, 2010.
- Lithuanian Yeshivas of the Nineteenth Century: Creating a Tradition of Learning Oxford: The Littman Library of Jewish Civilization, 2012.
- "Did the Khazars Convert to Judaism?" Jewish Social Studies 19,3 (2013): 1–72.
