= Oleg the Wise =

Varangian prince, founder of Kievan Rus'

Oleg
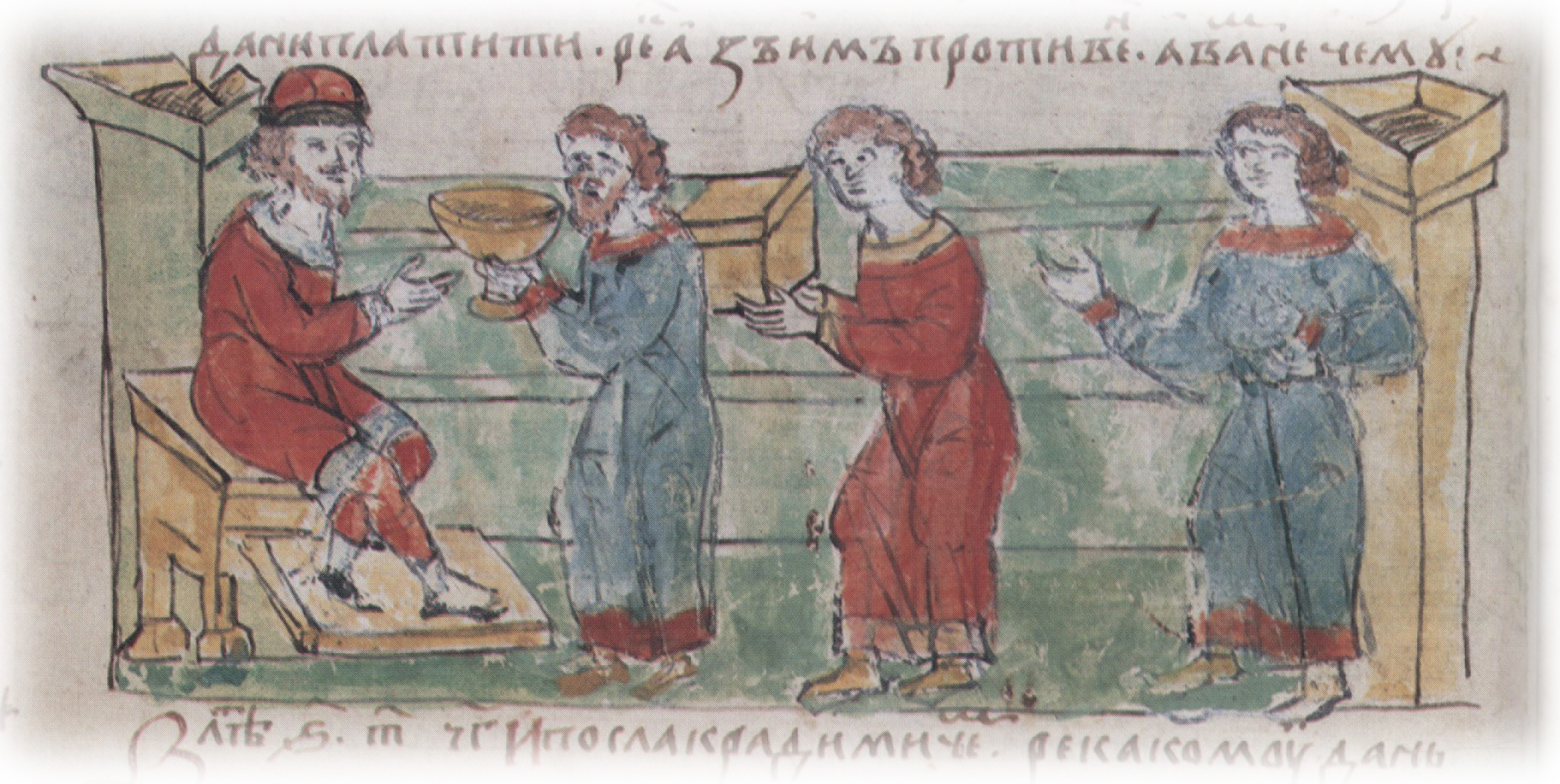
- Miniature from the Radziwiłł Chronicle, late 15th century. Oleg (far left) is shown receiving tribute from the Severians

Prince of Kiev
- Reign: 881/2/9 – 912/22/40s
- Predecessor: Askold and Dir
- Successor: Igor

Prince of Novgorod
- Reign: 879–912
- Predecessor: Rurik?
- Successor: Igor
- Died: 912
- Burial: Kiev (PVL) or Ladoga (NPL)
- Dynasty: disputed
- Father: unknown
- Religion: Old Norse religion

Oleg (Old East Slavic: Ѡлегъ, romanised: Ōlegǔ, Ольгъ, Olǐgǔ; Old Norse: Helgi; died 912), also known as Oleg the Wise, (Note: Belarusian: Алег Вешчы, romanised: Aleh Vieščy Russian: Олег Вещий, romanised: Oleg Veshij; Ukrainian: Олег Віщий, romanised: Oleh Vishchyi) was a Varangian prince of the Rus' who became prince of Kiev, and laid the foundations of the Kievan Rus' state.

According to the Primary Chronicle, he succeeded his "kinsman" Rurik as ruler of Novgorod, and subdued many of the East Slavic tribes to his rule, extending his control from Novgorod to the south along the Dnieper river. Oleg also launched a successful attack on Constantinople. He died in 912 and was succeeded by Rurik's son, Igor.

This traditional dating has been challenged by some historians, who point out that it is inconsistent with such other sources as the Schechter Letter, which mentions the activities of a certain khagan HLGW (Hebrew: הלגו usually transcribed Helgu. Compare Swedish first name Helge.) of Rus' as late as the 940s, during the reign of Byzantine Emperor Romanus I. The nature of Oleg's relationship with the Rurikid ruling family of the Rus', and specifically with his successor Igor of Kiev, is a matter of much controversy among historians.

== Oleg in chronicles ==
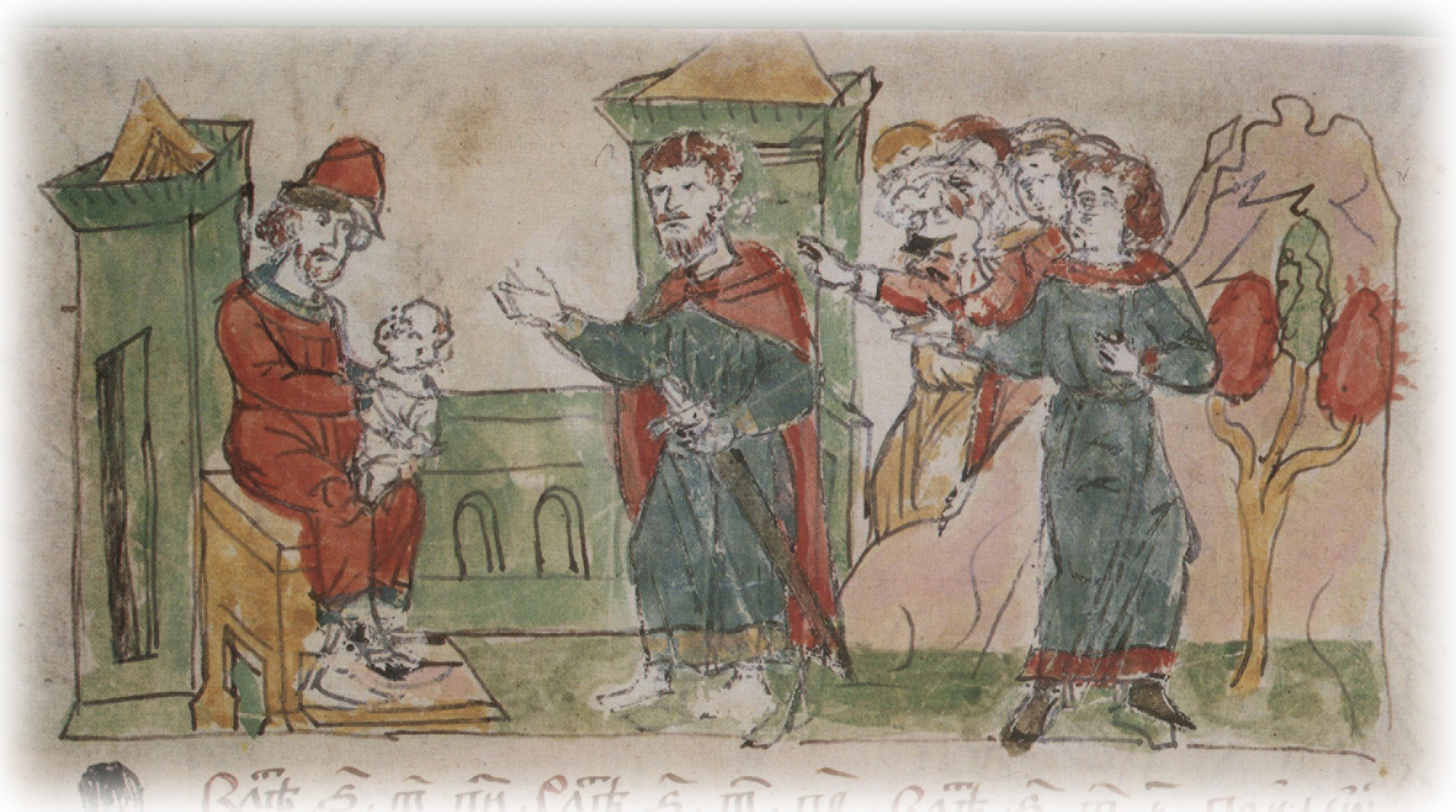
Rurik with Igor and Oleg, Radziwiłł Chronicle

According to the Primary Chronicle, Oleg was a "relative" or "kinsman" of Rurik, and was entrusted by Rurik to take care of both his realm and his young son Igor. However, his relation to Rurik is debatable, and has been rejected by several modern scholars. Oleg is narrated to have succeeded Rurik as the ruler of Novgorod in 879. In 881–882, he took control of Smolensk, and then seized power in Kiev by tricking and slaying Askold and Dir, and setting himself up as prince in Kiev, which is commonly taken as the founding of Kievan Rus'. Although Oleg was the first "prince" (knyaz) of Kiev according to the Primary Chronicle, he was not yet a "grand prince" (velikiy knyaz). Whereas later Muscovite chroniclers would call Oleg a "grand prince" and Kiev a "grand principality" (Russian: великое княжение, romanised: velikoe knyazhenie), the earliest sources do not.

In 883, Oleg made the Drevlians pay tribute to Kiev. In 907, the Drevlians took part in the Kievan military campaign against the Byzantine Empire: the Rus'-Byzantine War (907) against Constantinople in 907.

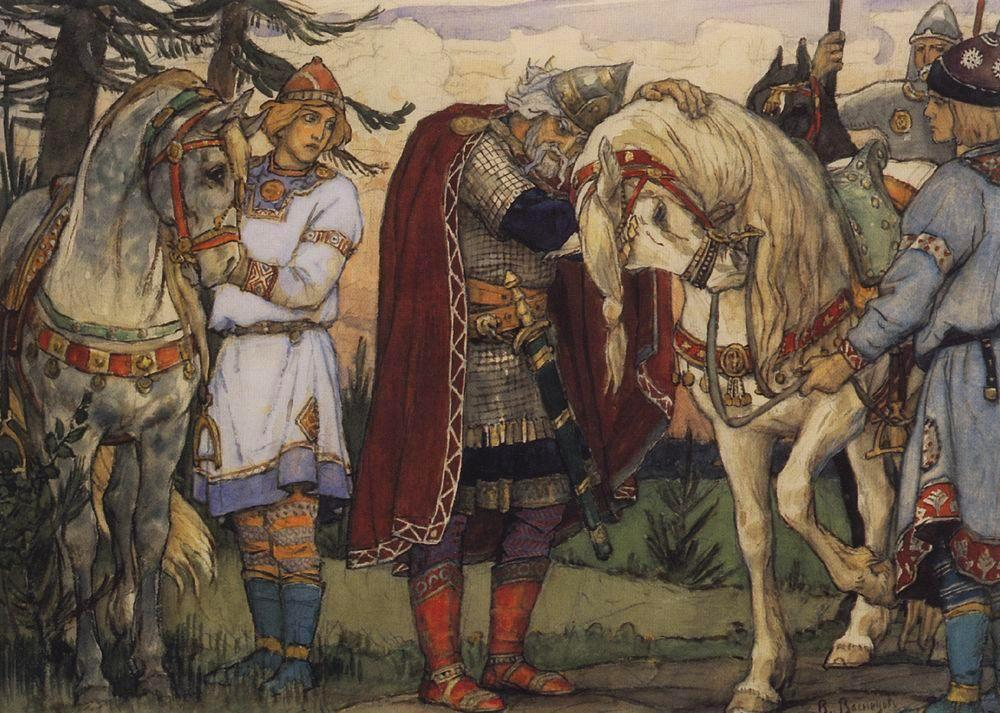
Viktor Vasnetsov. Oleg's farewell to his horse (1899).

Historian Vladimir Shikanov claims that Byzantium faced an attack by "raiders" who plundered the Thracian coast and wished to find honour in Constantinople, but were unable to, as the remaining fire-fighting ships under the command of Patrikios John Rodin defeated the Rus at Cape Tricephalus, and the treaty of 911 was a "gift" to the barbarians. making the course of the case more predictable. According to him, in the chronicle, the defeat was disguised as a great victory. Historian Vladimir Pashuto, on the other hand, believes that the peace treaty was beneficial to Rus' in all respects, regardless of the analysis and timeline of the campaign.

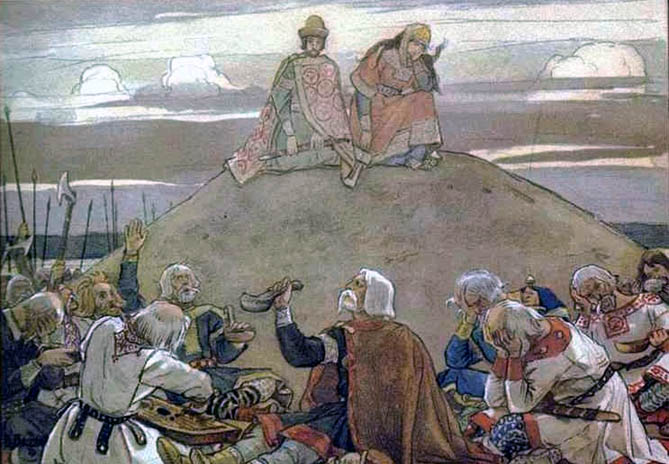
Viktor Vasnetsov. Oleg being mourned by his warriors (1899).

The brief account of Oleg's life in the Primary Chronicle contrasts with the version given in the Novgorod First Chronicle, which states that Oleg was not related to Rurik, and was rather a Scandinavian client-prince who served as Igor's army commander. The Novgorod First Chronicle does not give the date of the commencement of Oleg's reign, but dates his death to 922 rather than 912.

Scholars have contrasted this dating scheme with the "epic" reigns of roughly thirty-three years for both Oleg and Igor in the Primary Chronicle. The Primary Chronicle and other Kievan sources place Oleg's grave in Kiev, while Novgorodian sources identify a funerary barrow in Ladoga as Oleg's final resting place.

=== Death according to legend ===
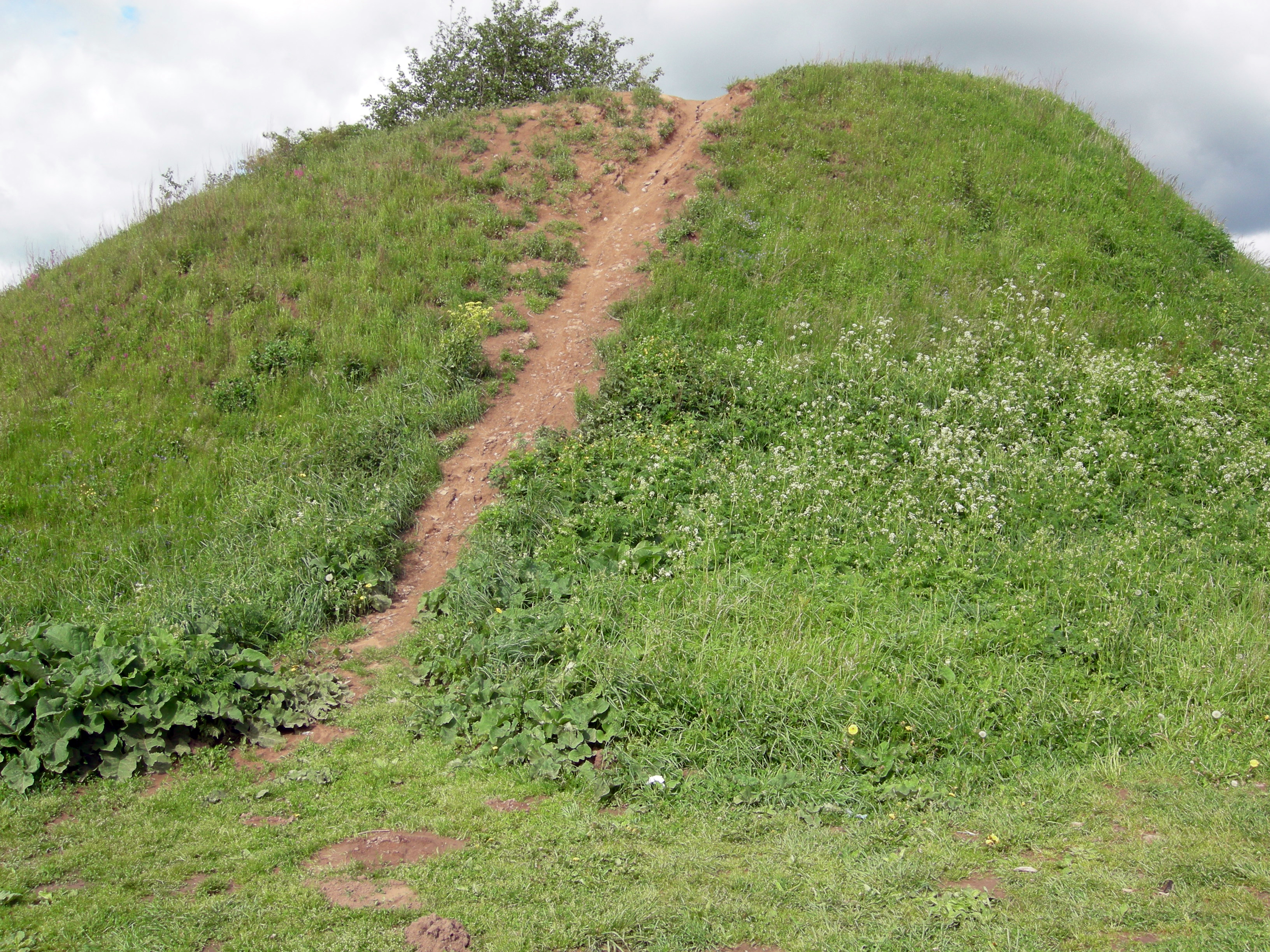
The reputed burial mound for Oleg of Novgorod; Volkhov River near Staraya Ladoga.

In the Primary Chronicle, Oleg is known as the Prophet, an epithet alluding to the sacred meaning of his Norse name ("priest"). According to the legend, romanticised by Alexander Pushkin in his ballad "The Song of the Wise Oleg", it was prophesied by the pagan priests (volkhvs) that Oleg would take death from his stallion.

To defy the prophecies, Oleg sent the horse away. Many years later he asked where his horse was, and was told it had died. He asked to see the remains and was taken to the place where the bones lay. When he touched the horse's skull with his boot a snake slithered from the skull and bit him. Oleg died, thus fulfilling the prophecy.

Oleg's death has been interpreted as a distorted variant of the threefold death theme in Indo-European myth and legend, with prophecy, the snake and the horse representing the three functions: the prophecy is associated with sovereignty, the horse with warriors, and the serpent with reproduction.

A variant of this story occurs in Scandinavian legend, in the 13th-century saga of Örvar-Oddr. Another variant is found in the tale of Sir Robert de Shurland on the Isle of Sheppey in Kent, England.

== Oleg of the Schechter Letter ==
According to the Primary Chronicle, Oleg died in 912 and his successor, Igor of Kiev, ruled from then until his assassination in 945. The Schechter Letter, a document written by a Jewish Khazar, a contemporary of Romanus I Lecapenus, describes the activities of a Rus' warlord named HLGW (Hebrew: הלגו), usually transcribed as "Helgu". For years many scholars disregarded or discounted the Schechter Letter account, which referred to Helgu (often interpreted as Oleg) as late as the 940s.

Recently, however, scholars such as David Christian and Constantine Zuckerman have suggested that the Schechter Letter's account is corroborated by various other Rus' chronicles, and suggests a struggle within the early Rus' polity between factions loyal to Oleg and to the Rurikid Igor, a struggle that Oleg ultimately lost. Zuckerman posited that the early chronology of the Rus' had to be re-determined in light of these sources. Among Zuckerman's beliefs and those of others who have analysed these sources are that the Khazars did not lose Kiev until the early 10th century (rather than 882, the traditional date), that Igor was not Rurik's son but rather a more distant descendant, and that Oleg did not immediately follow Rurik, but rather that there is a lost generation between the legendary Varangian lord and his documented successors.

Of particular interest is the fact that the Schechter Letter account of Oleg's death (namely, that he fled to and raided FRS, tentatively identified with Persia, and was slain there) bears remarkable parallels to the account of Arab historians such as Ibn Miskawayh, who described a similar Rus' attack on the Muslim state of Arran in the year 944/5.

== Attempts to reconcile the accounts ==
Prince Oleg Approached by Pagan Priests, a Kholuy illustration to Pushkin's ballad.

In contrast to Zuckerman's version, the Primary Chronicle and the later Kiev Chronicle place Oleg's grave in Kiev, where it could be seen at the time of the compilation of these documents. Furthermore, scholars have pointed out that if Oleg succeeded Rurik in 879 (as the East Slavic chronicles assert), he could hardly have been active almost 70 years later, unless he had a life-span otherwise unheard of in medieval annals. To solve these difficulties, Parkomenko (1924) proposed that the pagan monarch-priests of Rus' used the hereditary title of helgu, standing for "holy" in the Norse language, and that Igor and others held this title.

It has also been suggested that Helgu-Oleg who waged war in the 940s was distinct from both of Rurik's successors. He could have been one of the "fair and great princes" recorded in the Russo-Byzantine treaties of 911 and 944 or one of the "archons of Rus" mentioned in De administrando imperio.

Georgy Vernadsky even identified the Oleg of the Schechter Letter with Igor's otherwise anonymous eldest son, whose widow Predslava is mentioned in the Russo-Byzantine treaty of 944. Alternatively, V. Ya. Petrukhin speculated that Helgu-Oleg of the 940s was one of the vernacular princes of Chernigov, whose ruling dynasty maintained especially close contacts with Khazaria, as the findings at the Black Grave, a large royal kurgan excavated near Chernigov, seem to testify.

== Moscow ==
In legend, Oleg has also been identified as the founder of Moscow, a story found in "The Tale of Oleg, Founder of Moscow", otherwise called "Of the Beginnings of the Sovereign Town of Moscow", which scholars date to the second half of the 17th century. By the late 19th century, opinions of the accuracy of Oleg founding Moscow differed, with some supportive of this view while others saw it as an invention of later scribes.

== In popular culture ==
- Prince Oleg appears as the primary villain in season 6 of Vikings (2019–2020). In this production, Askold and Dir are portrayed as his brothers. He is played by Russian actor Danila Kozlovsky.

== Bibliography ==
- Artamonov, Mikhail. Istoriya Khazar. Leningrad, 1962.
- Bain, Robert Nisbet (1911). "Oleg" . In Chisholm, Hugh (ed.). Encyclopædia Britannica. Vol. 20 (11th ed.). Cambridge University Press. pp. 76–77.
- Brutskus, Julius D. Pismo Hazarskogo Evreja Ol X Veka. Berlin 1924.
- Christian, David. A History of Russia, Central Asia and Mongolia, Vol. 1. Blackwell, 1998.
- Dimnik, Martin (January 2004). "The Title "Grand Prince" in Kievan Rus'". Mediaeval Studies. 66: 253–312. doi:10.1484/J.MS.2.306512.
- Dunlop, D.M. History of the Jewish Khazars. Princeton: Princeton Univ. Press, 1954.
- Gregoire, H. 'Le "Glozel' khazare." Revue des Études Byzantines 12, 1937.
- Golb, Norman and Omeljan Pritsak. Khazarian Hebrew Documents of the Tenth Century. Ithaca: Cornell Univ. Press, 1982. [Note:as each author was responsible for separate sections of the work, they are referenced separately above.]
- Kloss, B.M. "Letopis' Novgorodskaja pervaja". Slovar' Kniznikov i Knizhnosti Drevnej Rusi, vol. 1. Leningrad 1987.
- Kokovtsov P.S. Еврейско-хазарская переписка в X веке. Leningrad 1932.
- al-Miskawaihi. The Eclipse of the 'Abbasid Caliphate. D. S. Margoliouth, trans. Oxford 1921.
- Mosin, V. "Les Khazars et les Byzantins d'apres l'Anonyme de Cambridge." Revue des Études Byzantines 6 (1931): 309–325.
- Nasonov, A.N., ed. Novgorodskaja Pervaja Letopis Starshego i Mladshego Izvodov. Moscow, 1950.
- Novoseltsev, Anatoli P. Hazarskoe Gosudarstvo i Ego Rol' v Istorii Vostochnoj Evropy i Kavkaza. Moscow 1990.
- Ostrowski, Donald (2018). "Was There a Riurikid Dynasty in Early Rus'?". Canadian-American Slavic Studies. 52 (1): 30–49. doi:10.1163/22102396-05201009.
- Parkomenko, V. A. (1924). У истоков русской государственности [On the Origins of Rus' Statehood]. Leningrad: Gosizdat. p. 113.
- Petrukhin V.Ya. "Князь Олег, Хелгу Кембриджского документа и русский княжеский род". Древнейшие государства Восточной Европы. 1998. Памяти А.П. Новосельцева. Moscow, Russian Academy of Sciences, 2000: 222–230.
- Pushkin, Alexander. The Song of the Wise Oleg. Leningrad, Aurora Art Publishers, 1991.
- Shahmatov, A.A. Ocherk Drevnejshego Perioda Istorii Russkogo Jazyka. Petrograd, 1915 (reprinted Paris 1967).
- Zuckerman, Constantine. "On the Date of the Khazar’s Conversion to Judaism and the Chronology of the Kings of the Rus' Oleg and Igor." Revue des Études Byzantines 53 (1995): 237–270.
- Vernadsky, Georgy. Kievan Rus. Moscow, 1996.
- Shikanov, Vladimir (2010). Византия. Из варяг в греки. Русско-византийские войны IX — XII вв. [Byzantium. From the Varangians to the Greeks. Russo-Byzantine Wars of the 9th - 12th Centuries] (in Russian). ISBN 5-8067-0053-4.
- Pashuto, Vladimir (1968). Внешняя политика Руси [The foreign policy of Rus'] (in Russian). Moscow: Наука.
- Gregory, Timothy E. (2005). A History of Byzantium. Blackwell Publishing. ISBN 0-6312-3512-4.

Preceded by Rurik	Prince of Novgorod c. 879 – c. 912/922/940s	Succeeded by Igor
Preceded by Askold and Dir	Prince of Kiev c. 881/2/9 – c. 912/922/940s	Succeeded by Igor
