= Calling of the Varangians =

Rus' people origin legend

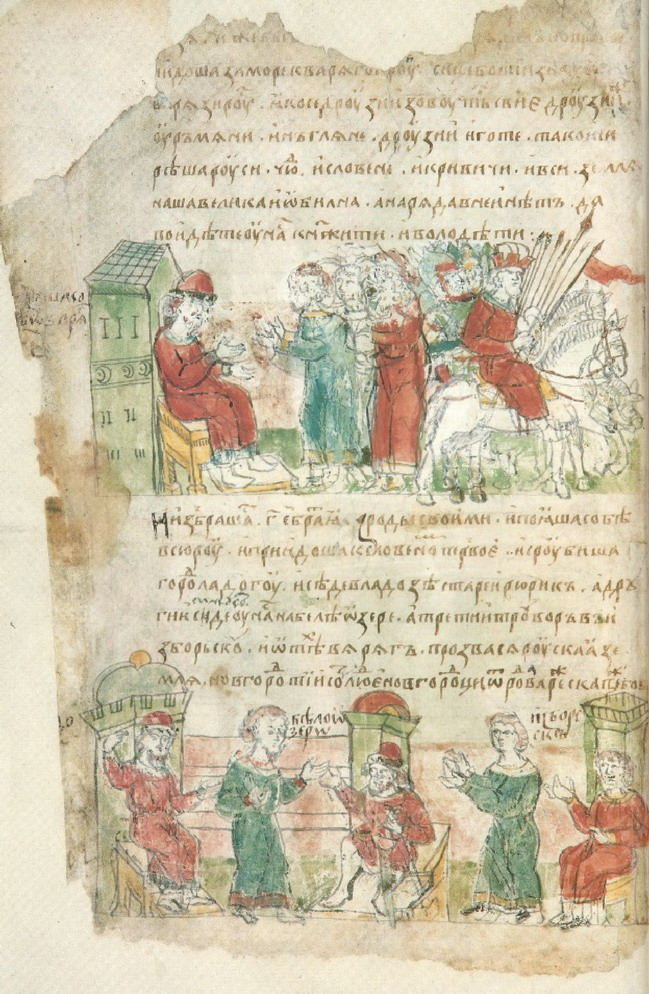
The calling of the Varangians illustrated in the Radziwiłł Chronicle (15th century)

The calling of the Varangians, calling of the (Varangian) princes or invitation to the Varangians (Note: Variations include "calling of the Varangians," "calling of the Varangian princes," "calling of the princes," "invitation to the Varangians," "invitation to the Varangian princes," and "invitation of the Varangians.") (Russian: призвание варягов, romanized: prizvaniye varyagov; Ukrainian: покликання варягів, romanized: poklykannya varyahiv) is a legend about the origins of the Rus' people, the Rurik dynasty and the Kievan Rus' state, recorded in many divergent versions in various manuscripts and compilations of Rus' chronicles. These include the six main witnesses of the Primary Chronicle (PVL; mainly the Laurentian (Lav.), Hypatian (Ipat.), and Radziwiłł (Rad.)) and the Novgorod First Chronicle (NPL), as well as later textual witnesses such as the Sofia First Chronicle and the Pskov Third Chronicle.

The common tradition is that some Slavic and Finnic tribes living east of the Baltic Sea were at some point paying tribute to the Varangians, then revolted and drove them back across the sea, only to then descend into inter-tribal conflict. To resolve this situation, the tribes agreed to seek a prince to reign over them and restore order, and for that they went across the sea to the Varangians and invited the three brothers Rurik, Sineus and Truvor to do so. After supposedly establishing themselves in either Novgorod (most texts) or Staraya Ladoga (Ipat.), Beloozero and Izborsk (most texts) or "Slovensk" (Note: See also The legend of Slovene and Ruse.) (P3L), respectively, two of the brothers died, and Rurik became the sole ruler of the territory. According to a later Muscovite church tradition developed in the 16th century, this made him the legendary progenitor of the Rurik dynasty, although primary sources before the mid-15th century appeared to be either completely unaware of Rurik's existence, or not particularly concerned with identifying him as the founder of a dynasty.

== Analysis ==
=== Ethnonymy and toponymy ===
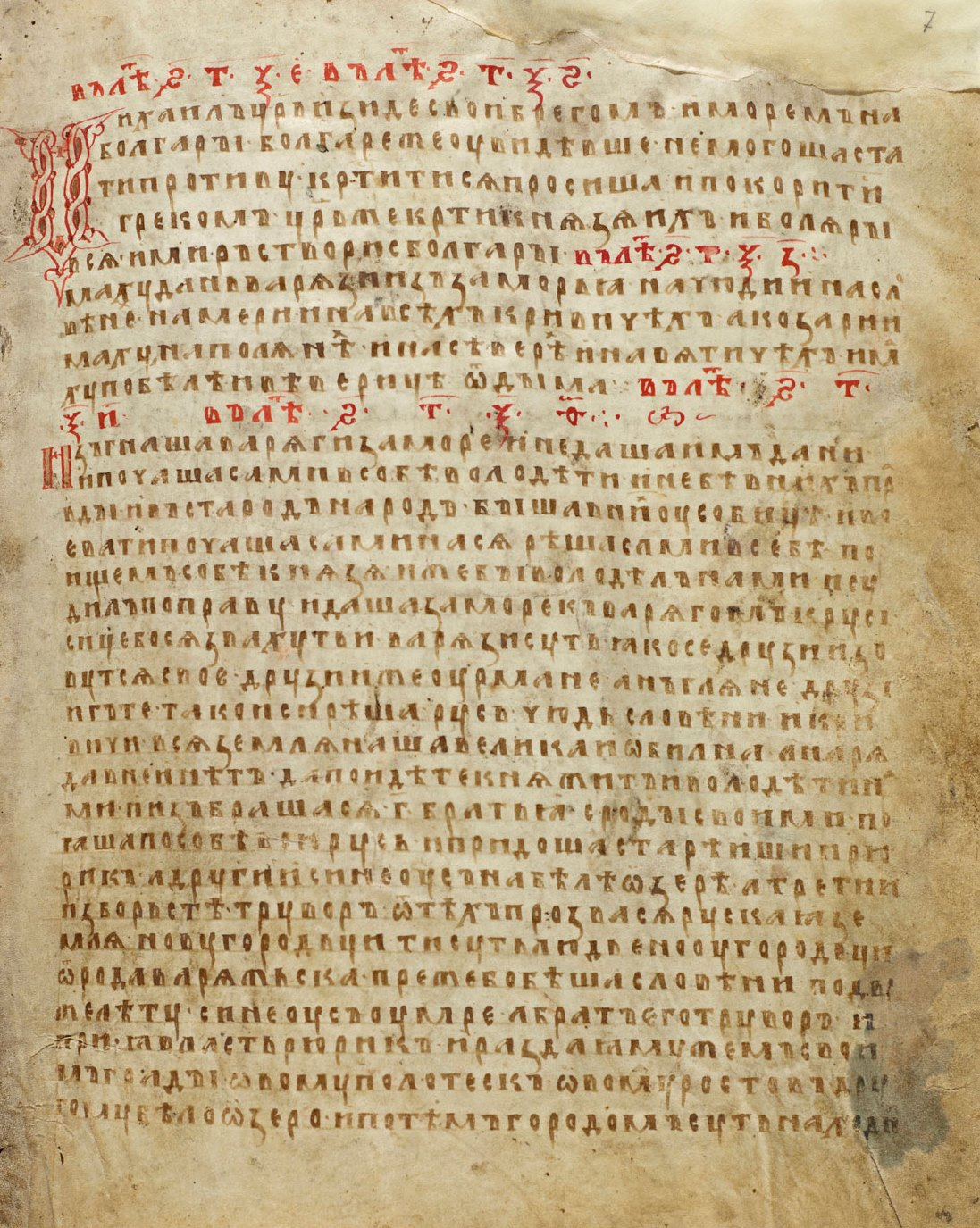
The calling of the Varangians in the Laurentian Codex (1377), fol. 7r

According to Cross & Sherbowitz-Wetzor (translators of the 1930/1953 English editions of the Laurentian Codex), the invitation of the Varangians 'has inspired a larger volume of controversial literature than any other disputed point in Russian history.' Contentions have centred on the meaning of the ethnonyms and toponyms used in the texts, whether Rus' refers to the Varangians (Normanism) or the Slavs (Anti-Normanism), and which versions of the texts were original and most reliable. In a broader sense, Normanism held that Scandinavians established the Kievan state, while Anti-Normanists argued that 'Kievan Rus' [was] essentially the creation of East Slavs who may simply have hired a Varangian military retinue to serve them.' Lind (2006) commented that 'ethnicity is a cultural construct and a fairly politically loaded one, but it is also a construct that people of the ninth and tenth centuries would not understand'.

The younger version of the Novgorod First Chronicle (N1L) preserves an older text than that found in copies of the Primary Chronicle (PVL), and sometimes directly contradicts it. Unlike the N1L's author, the compiler of the PVL was particularly interested in explaining the relationship between the terms Varangians and Rus'. This fitted with his larger geographical and ethnographical efforts of 'placing the Rus' in a biblical context', as well as 'want[ing] to map the peoples and regions with which this Rus' state came into contact.' Lind (2006) argued that the 'compiler, who was hardly Scandinavian, but still thought of himself as a Rus'', needed to solve the problem of himself natively speaking and writing a Slavic language yet self-identifying as Rus'. He knew that the name Rus' came from the Varangians in Scandinavia according the sources he had about the invitation of the Varangians in the mid-9th century, but also that the term "Varangians" had disappeared from texts such as the so-called Rus'-Byzantine Treaties of 907, 911, 944, and 971 that were presumably written only a few decades later.

=== Historicity ===
Modern scholars find the narrative of the invitation of the Varangians an unlikely series of events, probably made up by the 12th-century Orthodox priests who authored the Primary Chronicle as an explanation how the Vikings managed to conquer the lands along the Varangian route so easily, as well as to support the legitimacy of the Rurikid dynasty. Rurik is considered to be a legendary character by modern scholars; while some think he may be a mythical and perhaps even entirely fictional character (with Donald Ostrowski (2018) suggesting that "the chronicler" may have "created a fictional ruler named Riurik to provide [a] justification" for Igor's reign), others such as Norman W. Ingham and Christian Raffensperger (2007) think "Ryurik is [not necessarily] entirely fictional." (Note: Christian Raffensperger (2012, 2017), Ostrowski (2018), Halperin (2022).) Nicholas V. Riasanovsky (1947) stated: '...no Kievan sources anterior to the Primary Chronicle (early twelfth century), knew of Riurik. In tracing the ancestry of Kievan princes they usually stopped with Igor.' The Primary Chronicle never calls Rurik a prince of Kiev; Ostrowski (2018) pointed out that the passage wherein Oleg "sat in Kiev" (Old East Slavic: понелѣже сѣде въ Кыевѣ, romanized: ponelězhe sěde v" Kyyevě) makes no mention of Rurik, suggesting the author was 'more interested in the first Rus' ruler to reside in Kiev than with any founder of a dynasty'.

The term "Rurikid dynasty" was only coined in the 16th century, when Rus' churchmen developed this concept of a R(i)urikid dynasty for the purpose of "bolstering the Muscovite dynastic state." Because of these issues, various scholars have instead named the dynasty the Volodimerovichi (Volodymyrovichi), descendants of grand prince Volodimer I of Kiev. As a whole, some scholars consider the calling of the Varangians and the subsequent "foundation" of the "Rus' state" and "Rurikid dynasty" by Rurik a founding myth of Kievan Rus'. Through a translatio imperii, it was also adopted as a founding myth of the Grand Duchy of Moscow (Muscovy) in the 15th century, and the Muscovite Daniilovichi dynasty in the 16th century.

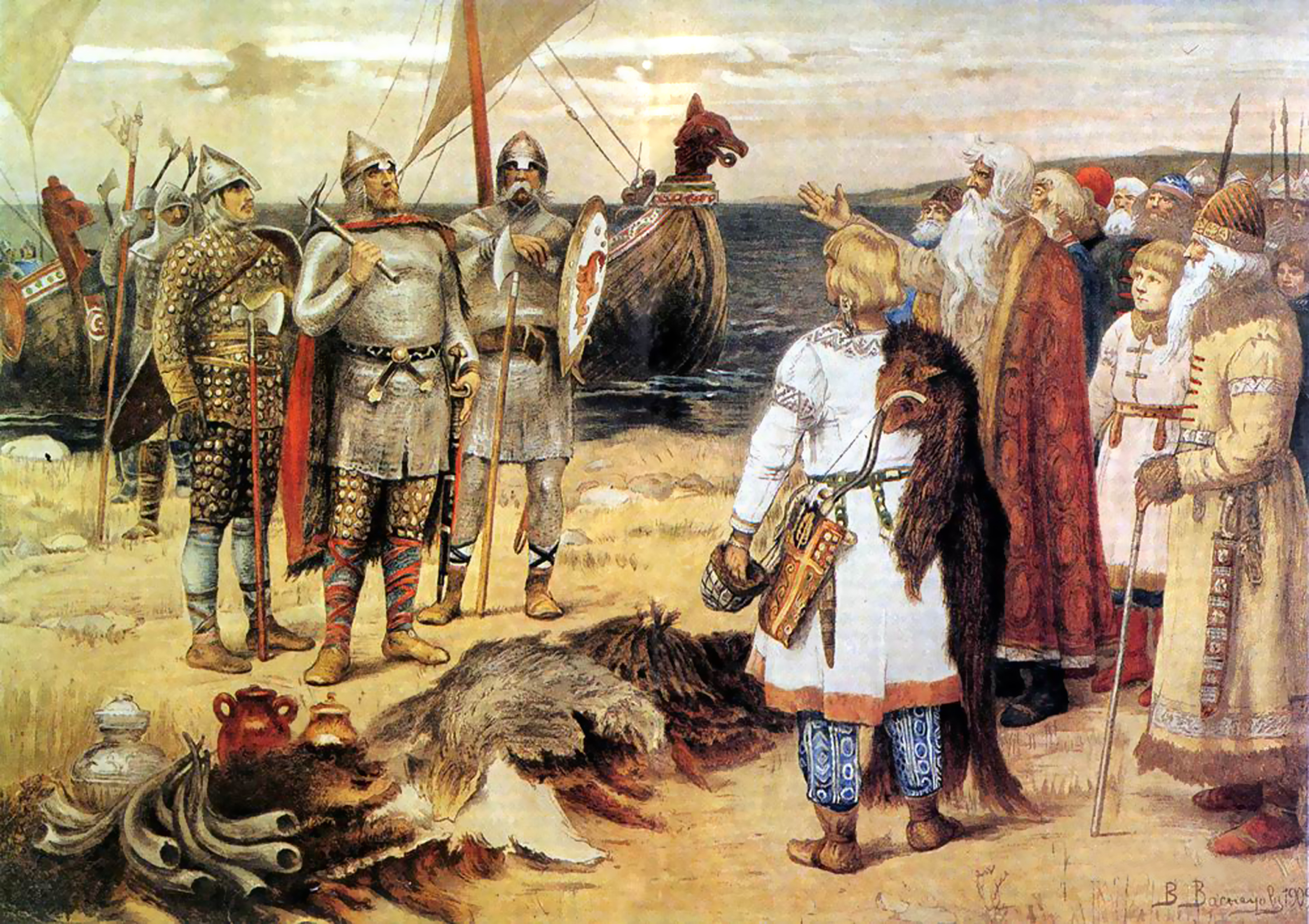
The Invitation of the Varangians painted by Viktor Vasnetsov (c. 1913): arrival of Rurik, Sineus and Truvor

On the other hand, some of the developments mentioned in the narrative are generally found to be historically plausible. The scholarly consensus is that Varangians, also known as Rus', came from Scandinavia and gave rise to the Kievan Rus' state, although it was built on several existing local cities, socio-economic structures and cultural traditions. (Note: "It is now, indeed, widely recognized that the Kiev state was not born ex nihilo with the advent of the Varangians in the 9th century (...) It is equally clear, however, that it was the Scandinavian invaders who in the second half of the ninth century united the scattered tribes of the Eastern Slavs into a single state based on the Baltic–Black Sea waterway, to which they gave their Rus' name.") Scholars such as Janet Martin (2009b) think that by the early 9th century, bands of Scandinavian adventurers known as Varangians and later Rus' started plundering various (Slavic) villages in the region, later extracting tribute in exchange for protection against pillaging by other Varangians. Over time, these relationships of tribute for protection evolved into more permanent political structures: the Rus' lords became princes and the Slavic populace their subjects. Scholars such as Paul Magocsi (2010) place more emphasis on the role later played by Oleg the Wise than that of the supposedly 'invited' Varangians Rurik and his brothers: 'Regardless of the uncertainties surrounding the origin of Rus', with Helgi/Oleh (reigned 878–912) we have a known historical figure credited with building the foundations of a Kievan state. (...) With Oleh's invasion of Kiev and the assassination of Askol'd and Dir in 882, the consolidation of the East Slavic and Finnic tribes under the authority of the Varangian Rus' had begun.' Oleg was the first "prince" (knyaz) of Kiev according to the Primary Chronicle, although he was not yet called a "grand prince" (velikiy knyaz). Oleg's relation to Rurik remains debatable, and has been rejected by several modern scholars.

Despite doubts about its historicity, the legend of the invitation of the Varangians has long been 'understood by scholars as a kind of a starting point of the Russian state'. Similarly, historiography has commonly assumed 'that the Riurikid dynasty ruled Rus'', supposedly 'founded by the Viking Riurik while the primary sources before the fifteenth century seem to be completely unaware of or, at the very least, unconcerned that Riurik did so.' As a 'starting point', the legendary Varangian invitation is favoured over more obscure narratives such as the possible mention of a "Rus' Khaganate" in the Annales Bertiniani, which has been a similar source of perpetual disagreement.

== Texts ==
Act	Novgorod First Chronicle (NPL)		Laurentian Codex (Lav)		Hypatian Codex (Ipa, Ipat)		Radziwiłł Chronicle (Rad)	
	Church Slavonic	Modern English	Church Slavonic	Modern English	Church Slavonic	Modern English	Church Slavonic	Modern English
Revolt; 19:14–16	В лѣто 6362 (854) (...) И въсташа словенѣ и кривици и меря и чюдь на варягы, и изгнаша я за море; и начаша владѣти сами собѣ и городы ставити.	In the year 6362 (854) (...) And the Slovenes and Krivitsi and Merya and Chudĭ rose against the Varangians and expelled them beyond the sea; and they began to rule themselves and set up cities.	Въ лето 6369. Изъгнаша варяги за море, и не даша имъ дани, и почаша сами в собе володети.	6368–6370 (860–862). The tributaries of the Varangians drove them back beyond the sea and, refusing them further tribute, set out to govern themselves.	В лѣто [6370 (862)] И изгнаша Варѧгы за море, и не даша имъ дани. Н почаша сами в собѣ володѣти.	In the year [6370 (862)] And they expelled the Varangians across the sea, and gave them no tribute, and they themselves became masters.	В лѣт. ҂ѕ҃.т҃.о҃. Бы[г]ша варѧгы за морь[ꙗ] и не да им дани. и почаша сами в собѣ володѣти.	In the year 6370, [they] exiled the Varangians beyond the sea and gave them no tribute. And they themselves became masters of their own affairs.
Conflict; 19:16–18	И въсташа сами на ся воеватъ, и бысть межи ими рать велика и усобица, и въсташа град на град, и не бѣше в нихъ правды.	And they arose to fight with themselves, and there was great strife and discord between them, and they rose up city upon city, and there was no righteousness among them.	И не бе в нихъ пра вды, и въста родъ на родъ, быша в них усобице, и во евати почаша сами на ся.	There was no law among them, but tribe rose against tribe. Discord thus ensued among them, and they began to war one against another.	и не бѣ в нихъ правды, и въста родъ на род, и быша оусобицѣ в них, и воєвати сами на сѧ почаша.	And they had no righteousness, and clan stood up against clan, and they were plagued by strife within them, and they began to fight against each other.	и не бѣ в них правды. и восташа род на род. и быша в них оусобици. воевати по <...>	And there was no righteousness among them. And they rose up clan against clan. And there were wars among them <...>.
Agreement; 19:18–20	И рѣша к себѣ: «князя поищемъ, иже бы владѣлъ нами и рядилъ ны по праву».	And they resolved to themselves: "Let us look for a prince who would rule over us and reward us according to our rights."	Реша сами в себе: «По ищемъ собе князя, иже бы володелъ нами и су дилъ по праву».	They said to themselves, "Let us seek a prince who may rule over us and judge us according to the Law."	И ркоша: «поищемъ сами в собѣ кнѧзѧ, иже бы володѣлъ нами и рѧдилъ по рѧду, по праву».	And they said: "Let us look for a prince for ourselves, who would command us and rule according to order, according to the law."	<...> зѧ. иже бы <в...> рѧдилъ по правоу	<...>ce, who would <r...> according to the law."
Journey & ethnonym 19:20–24	Идоша за море к варягомъ	They went over the sea to the Varangians	Идоша за море къ варягомъ, к руси. Сице бо ся зваху тьи варязи суть, яко се друзии зо вутся свие, друзии же урмане, анъгляне, друзи и гъте, тако и си.	They accordingly went overseas to the Varangian Rus': these particular Varangians were known as Rus', just as some are called Swedes, and others Normans, English, and Gotlanders, for they were thus named.	идоша за море к Варѧгом. к Руси; сіце бо звахуть ты Варѧгы Русь, ӕко се друзии зовутсѧ Свеє, друзии же Оурмани, Аньглѧне, инѣи и Готе, тако и си.	They went across the sea to the Varangians, to the Rus'; for this reason thou shalt call the Varangians the Rus', as the others are called Svej [Swedes], and the others Ourmany [Normans?], Anĭgliane [Angles], and still others Gote [Goths/Gotlanders?], so they are.	и идоша за море к варѧго<м> к ру<с> сице бо тїи звахоус варѧзи роус ꙗко се дроузии зовоутьс свие дроузииж оуръмѧни. инъглѧне. дроузии и готе. тако и си	And they went across the sea to the Varangian[s], to the Ru[s]; for these Varangians were called Rus, as others are called Svye (Swedes), and others Urŭmiany [Normans?], Ynŭgliane [Angles], and others Gote [Goths/Gotlanders?], so they are.
Invitation; 19:24–20:3	и ркоша: «земля наша велика и обилна, а наряда у нас нѣту; да поидѣте к намъ княжить и владѣть нами».	and said: "Our land is great and plenty, but we have no order; so come to us to reign and rule us."	Реша русь, чюдь, словени, и кри вичи, вся: «Земля наша велика и обилна, а наря да в ней нетъ. Да поидете княжитъ и володети на ми».	The Chuds, the Slavs, the Krivichians, and the Ves' then said to the people of Rus', "Our land is great and rich, but there is no order in it. Come to rule and reign over us."	Ркоша Русь, Чюдь, Словенѣ, Кривичи, и всѧ: «Землѧ наша велика и ѡбилна а нарѧда въ неи нѣтъ. да поидете кнѧжит̑ и володѣть нами».	The Rus', Chudĭ, Slovenes, Krivichi and Ves' said: "Our land is great and rich, but there is no order in it. So go reign and rule over us and judge."	рѣша роуси. чюд. и словене. и кривичи. и вси. землѧ наша велика и ѡбилна. а нарѧда в неи нѣтъ. да поидѣте оу нас кн҃жити. и володѣти:-	The Rus', Chud, Slovenes, Krivichi and Ves' said: "Our land is great and rich, but there is no order in it. So come and reign and govern over us."
Arrival; 20:3–11	Изъбрашася 3 брата с роды своими, и пояша со собою дружину многу и предивну, и приидоша к Новугороду. И сѣде старѣишии в Новѣгородѣ, бѣ имя ему Рюрикъ; а другыи сѣде на Бѣлѣозерѣ, Синеусъ; а третеи въ Изборьскѣ, имя ему Труворъ. И от тѣх варягъ, находникъ тѣхъ, прозвашася Русь, и от тѣх словет Руская земля; и суть новгородстии людие до днешняго дни от рода варяжьска.	Three brothers took off with their clans, and they brought a great and foremost army with them, and came to Novѣgorodѣ. And the eldest sits in Novѣgorodѣ, his name is Ryurikŭ; the second sits on Bѣlѣozesѣ [Bele-Ozero, "White Lake"], Syneusŭ; and the third sits in Izbor'skѣ, his name is Truvorŭ. And from those Varangians, the finders of those things, were nicknamed Rus', and from those things came the Rus' land; and the people of Novgorod are from the Varangians until this day.	И изъбрашася 3 братья с роды своими, по яша по собе всю русь, и придоша: старейший Рю рикъ, а другий - Синеусъ на Беле-озере, а третий Изборьсте Труворъ. От техъ прозвася Руская зе мля, новугородьци, ти суть людье ноугородьци от рода варяжьска. Преже бо беша словени.	They thus selected three brothers, with their kinsfolk, who took with them all the Rus' and migrated. The oldest, Rurik, located himself in Novgorod; the second, Sineus, at Beloozero; and the third, Truvor, in Izborsk. On account of these Varangians, the district of Novgorod became known as the land of Rus'. The present inhabitants of Novgorod are descended from the Varangian race, but aforetime they were Slavs.	и изъбрашасѧ триє брата с роды своими, и поӕша по собѣ всю Русь и придоша къ Словѣномъ пѣрвѣє, и срубиша город̑ Ладогу. и сѣде старѣишии в Ладозѣ Рюрикъ, а другии Синєоусъ на Бѣлѣѡзерѣ, а третѣи Труворъ въ Изборьсцѣ. и ѿ тѣхъ Варѧгъ прозвасѧ Рускаӕ землѧ.	And having chosen three brothers from their people, they took with them all the Russes and came first to the Slavs (Slovenes), and they built the city of Ladoga. Ryurikŭ, the eldest, settled in Ladoga [Ladozě], Sineusŭ, the second, at Bělěōzerě ["White Lake"], and Truvorŭ, the third, in Izborsk [Izborǐstsě]. From these Varangians the land of Rus' received its name.	И избрашас .г҃. е братѧ. з роды своими. и поꙗша собѣ всю роу. и приидоша к словеном первое. и сроубиша город ладогоу. и сѣде в ладозѣ стареи рюрикъ. а дрѹгии с<и>де оу нас на белѣѡзере. а третии трѹворъ въ изборьскѹ. и ѡ тѣх вѧрѧгъ. прозвасѧ роускаа землѧ новгород тїи сѹт люде новгородци ѿ род варежска преж бо бѣ	And having chosen three brothers from their people, they took with them all the Rus' and came first to the Slovenes. And they built the city of Ladoga. And the oldest, Ryurikŭ, settled in Ladoga [Ladozě]. And the second/other settled with us at Bеlěōzere ["White Lake"]. And the third, Truvorŭ, in Izborǐsku. From these Varangians the land of Rus' received its name. Novgorod and the essence of the Novgorodians were from the Varangian clan before that.
Deaths; 20:11–19	По двою же лѣту умрѣ Синеусъ и брат его Труворъ, и прия власть единъ Рюрикъ, обою брату власть, и нача владѣти единъ.	Two years later Sineusŭ and his brother Truvorŭ died, and only Ryurikŭ took power, the authority of both his brothers, and he began to reign alone.	По дву же лету Синеусъ умре и братъ его Труворъ. И прия власть Рюрикъ, и раздая мужемъ свои мъ грады: овому Полотескъ, овому Ростовъ, дру гому Белоозеро. И по темъ городомъ суть находни ци варязи; перьвии насельници в Новегороде словене, Полотьски кривичи, в Ростове меря, в Беле-озере весь, в Муроме мурома. И теми всеми обладаше Рюрикъ.	After two years, Sineus and his brother Truvor died, and Rurik assumed the sole authority. He assigned cities to his followers, Polotsk to one, Rostov to another, and to another Beloozero. In these cities there are thus Varangian colonists, but the first settlers were, in Novgorod, Slavs; in Polotsk, Krivichians; at Beloozero, Ves', in Rostov, Merians; and in Murom, Muromians. Rurik had dominion over all these districts.	По дъвою же лѣту оумре Синеоусъ и братъ єго Труворъ, и приӕ Рюрикъ власть всю ѡдинъ. и пришед' къ Ильмєрю и сруби город' надъ Волховом', и прозваша и Новъгород' и сѣде ту кнѧжа', и раздаӕ мужемъ своимъ волости, и городы рубити, ѡвому Полътескъ, ѡвому Ростовъ, другому Бѣлоѡзеро. И по тѣмь городомъ суть находницѣ Варѧзи; пѣрвии наслѣдници в Новѣгородѣ Словенѣ, и в Пол̑о̑тьскѣ Кривичи, Ростовѣ Мерѧне, Бѣлѣѡзерѣ Весь, Муромѣ Мурома. И тѣми всѣми ѡбладаше Рюрикъ.	After two years Sineusŭ died, as well as his brother Truvorŭ, and Ryurikŭ assumed the sole authority. He then came to the Ilĭmer and founded on the Volkhov a city, which they named Novûgorod', and he settled there as prince, assigning cities and towns to his men, Polŭteskŭ to the one, Rostově to the other, and Běloōzero to another. And Varangians were the finders of these towns; the original descendants in Nověgorodě were Sloveně, and in Polôtĭskě were Krivichi, Rostovŭ Meręne, Bělěōzerě Vesĭ, Muromě Muromians. And Ryurikŭ possessed all these things.	По двою же лѣтоу оумре синеоусъ. и братъ его трѹворъ. и приа всю власть рюрикъ ѡдинъ. и пришед ко илмерю. и сроуби городкъ над волховом. и прозва новъгород. и сѣде тоу кн҃жа. раздаа волости. моужемъ своим. и городы роубити. ѡвомѹ полтескъ. ѡвомоу ростовъ. дроугомѹ бѣлоѡзеро. и по тѣмъ городомъ нахо дници соуть варѧзи. а первии насельници в новѣгород словени. в полоцкѹ кривичи. в ростове мерѧне. в белѣѡзере вес. в муромѣ мурома. и тѣми всѣми ѡбладаше рюрикъ.	After two years Sineusŭ died, as well as his brother Truvorŭ, and Ryurikŭ assumed the sole authority. He then came to the Ilĭmer and founded on the Volkhov a city, which they named Novŭgorod, and he settled there as prince, assigning cities to his men, Polteskŭ to the one, Rostovŭ to the other, and Běloōzero to another. And in those cities there were Varangians. And the first inhabitants of Novŭgorod were Slovenes. In Polotsku, there were Krivichi. In Rostove, there were Meręne. In Belěōzero, there were Ves. In Muromŭ, there were Muromians. And all of them were ruled by Ryurikŭ.
(Next)	(Text continues with a story about Igor and Oleg's campaign against Kiev, modern Kyiv).		(Text continues with a story about the reign of Askold and Dir in Kiev, modern Kyiv).		(Text continues with a story about the reign of Askold and Dir in Kiev, modern Kyiv).			

== Bibliography ==
=== Primary sources ===
- Complete Collection of Russian Chronicles (PSRL). Saint Petersburg: Typography of Edward Prats.
  - Izbornyk (1908). Лѣтопись По Ипатьевскому Списку [The Chronicle according to the Hypatian Codex]. Complete Collection of Russian Chronicles (PSRL). Volume 2. 3rd Edition. Col. 15. Saint Petersburg: Typography of Edward Prats.
- Cross, Samuel Hazzard; Sherbowitz-Wetzor, Olgerd P. (1953). The Russian Primary Chronicle, Laurentian Text. Translated and edited by Samuel Hazzard Cross and Olgerd P. Sherbowitz-Wetzor (PDF). Cambridge, Massachusetts: The Mediaeval Academy of America. p. 325. (First edition published in 1930. The first 50 pages are a scholarly introduction.)
  - Cross, Samuel Hazzard; Sherbowitz-Wetzor, Olgerd P. (2013) [1953]. SLA 218. Ukrainian Literature and Culture. Excerpts from The Rus' Primary Chronicle (Povest vremennykh let, PVL) (PDF). Toronto: Electronic Library of Ukrainian Literature, University of Toronto. p. 16. Archived from the original (PDF) on 30 May 2014.
- Gorsky, A. A. (2012). "Приглашение Рюрика на княжение в памятниках древнерусского начального летописания" [Rurik's invitation to reign in the records of the old Rus' Primary Chronicle]. Исторический вестник (Historical Messenger) (in Russian). 1 (1). Runivers: 6–23. (web text)
- Ostrowski, Donald; Birnbaum, David J. (7 December 2014). "Rus' primary chronicle critical edition – Interlinear line-level collation". pvl.obdurodon.org (in Church Slavic). Archived from the original on 28 April 2025.

=== Literature ===
- Dimnik, Martin (January 2004). "The Title "Grand Prince" in Kievan Rus'". Mediaeval Studies. 66: 253–312. doi:10.1484/J.MS.2.306512.
- Duczko, Władysław (2004). Viking Rus: Studies on the Presence of Scandinavians in Eastern Europe. Leiden: Brill. p. 290. ISBN 9789004138742.
- Halperin, Charles J. (2022). The Rise and Demise of the Myth of the Rus' Land (PDF). Leeds: Arc Humanities Press. p. 107. ISBN 9781802700565.
- Lind, John H. (2006). "Problems of Ethnicity in the Interpretation of Written Sources on Early Rus'". Slavica Helsingiensia. 27: 246–258.
- Magocsi, Paul R. (2010). A History of Ukraine: The Land and Its Peoples. Toronto: University of Toronto Press. p. 896. ISBN 978-1-4426-1021-7.
- Martin, Janet (2009b). "From Kiev to Muscovy: The Beginnings to 1450". In Freeze, Gregory (ed.). Russia: A History. Oxford: Oxford University Press. pp. 1–30. ISBN 978-0-19-150121-0. (third edition)
- Ostrowski, Donald (2018). "Was There a Riurikid Dynasty in Early Rus'?". Canadian-American Slavic Studies. 52 (1): 30–49. doi:10.1163/22102396-05201009.
- Plokhy, Serhii (2006). The Origins of the Slavic Nations: Premodern Identities in Russia, Ukraine, and Belarus (PDF). New York: Cambridge University Press. pp. 10–15. ISBN 978-0-521-86403-9.
- Raffensperger, Christian (2016). Ties of Kinship: Genealogy and Dynastic Marriage in Kyivan Rus'. Cambridge, Massachusetts: Harvard Ukrainian Research Institute. p. 418. ISBN 9781932650136.
