= Askold and Dir =

Earliest known Norse rulers of Kiev

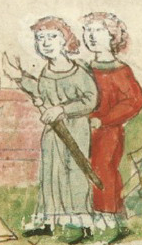
- Miniature from the Radziwiłł Chronicle, late 15th century. Askold and Dir.

Prince of Kiev
- Reign: c.864- 882?
- Successor: Oleg
- Died: 882?
- Burial: Kiev
- Dynasty: disputed
- Father: unknown
- Religion: Old Norse religion

Saint Askold of Kyiv
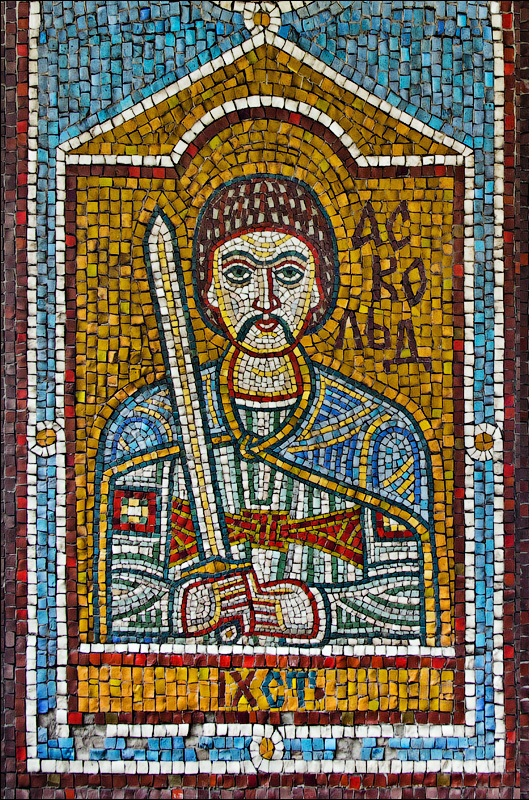

Protomartyr
- Venerated in: Orthodox Church of Ukraine
- Canonized: 2013; 13 years ago by Ukrainian Orthodox Church - Kyiv Patriarchate
- Feast: 2nd Sunday after Pentecost

Askold and Dir (Haskuldr or Hǫskuldr and Dyr or Dýri in Old Norse; died in 882), mentioned in both the Primary Chronicle and the Younger Redaction of the Novgorod First Chronicle, are the earliest recorded Varangian rulers of Kiev (modern Kyiv). There has been controversy over what these records mean for the historicity, origins, status and identity of Askold and Dir.

Map of Europe in 814

== Accounts of Askold and Dir ==
=== Primary Chronicle and Novgorod First Chronicle ===
The Laurentian Codex of the Primary Chronicle relates that Askold and Dir were sanctioned by Rurik to go to Constantinople (Norse Miklagård, Slavic Tsargrad). When travelling on the Dnieper, they settled in Kiev seizing power over the Polans who had been paying tribute to the Khazars.

Until the 19th century, the Primary Chronicle (the Nachal'naya Letopis') was habitually attributed to the monk Nestor. Modern investigators have not only placed his authorship in doubt, but have also sought to establish by internal evidence that the Primary Chronicle, instead of being a homogenous work, is a compilation from several chronicle texts of greater antiquity. Nestor the Chronicler is the undisputed author of the biographical work "The Narrative of the Life, Death and Miracles of the Holy and Blessed Martyrs Boris and Gleb" and a comparative study of two accounts presents no stylistic evidence that Nestor was in any way concerned with the composition or compilation of the Primary Chronicle, while the contradictions between the two narratives point rather in the opposite direction. A more likely candidate as author is Sylvester of Kiev, hegumen (abbot) of the St. Michael's Monastery in Vydubychi (a village near Kyiv), who may have compiled several sources in the year 1116. In any case, the Primary Chronicle was written approximately 250 years after the events involving Askold and Dir. The beginning of the Synod Scroll or "Older Edition" of the Novgorod First Chronicle is missing. The surviving text starts in the middle of a sentence in the year 1016. The lost contents of the Synod Scroll before the year 1016 are unknown, and can only be speculated about.

==== The murder of Askold and Dir ====
The chronicle also states that they were killed by Varangian Novgorod prince Oleg the Wise in 882. Dating is tentative, as the annalistic legend was written in one and a half or two centuries after the event. Behind the annalistic story there is a real event, violent transition of authority in Kiev to new dynasty Rurikovich. The murder described in the Primary Chronicle (Tale of Bygone Years) and the Novgorod First Chronicle. According to the Primary Chronicle, Oleg set forth, taking with him many warriors from among the Varangians, the Chuds, the Slavs, the Meryans, the Ves', the Krivichians. He thus arrived with his Krivichians before Smolensk, captured the city, and set up a garrison there. Thence he went on and captured Lyubech, where he also set up a garrison. He then came to the hills of Kiev, and saw how Askold and Dir reigned there. Oleg came to the foot of the Hungarian hill using trickery, he hid his warriors in the boats, left some others behind, and went forward himself bearing the child Igor’. Oleg sent messengers to Askold and Dir, representing himself as a guest (merchant) on his way to Greece on an errand for Oleg and for Igor', the prince's son, and requesting that they should come forth to greet them as members of their kinship. Askold and Dir straightway came forth. Then all the soldiery jumped out of the boats, and Oleg said to Askold and Dir, "You are not princes nor even of princely stock, but I am of princely birth." Igor' was then brought forward, and Oleg announced him as a son of Rurik. They killed Askold and Dir, and after carrying them to the hill, they buried them there, on the hill known as Hungarian. After that, without resistance from the people of Kiev, Oleg settled to rule in Kiev, proclaiming it the "mother of Rus' cities" (the chronicler called Kiev "mother" rather than "father" through the prince's words, because "mother of cities" is a literal translation of the Greek word "metropolis," i.e., "capital").

In Primary Chronicle
Original text in Old East Slavic:	Variants
В лѣто . ҂s҃ . т҃ . ч҃ [6390 (882)] Поиде Ѡлгъ поємъ вои свои ^{32} многы . Варѧгы Чюдь. Словѣны . Мѣрю . Весь ^{Д} . Кривичи ^{33} . и приӕ городъ ^{Е} и посади в нє^{м̑} мужь свои . ѿтуда поиде внизъ . и пришєдъ ^{34} взѧ Любечь . и посади мужь свои . и пр^{и̑}доста къ горамъ Києвьскымъ . и оувидѣ Ѡлгъ . ӕко Ѡсколдъ и Дир^{д̑}ъ ^{35} ^{Ж} кн^{ѧ̑}жита . и похорони вои въ лодьӕхъ . а другыӕ назади ѡстави . а самъ ^{З} при^{д̑} . носѧ Игорѧ молод(а) ^{36} и приступль . по^{д̑} Оугорьскоє . похоронивъ вои свои . и посла къ Асколду . и Диру ^{37}гл҃ѧ . ӕко гостьє єсмы . идемъ въ Грѣкы ѿ Ѡлга . и ѿ Игор^{ѧ̑} кнѧжича ^{И}. да приид(е)та ^{38} к роду своєму к нам(ъ.) Асколдъ же и Дир^{д̑}ъ ^{39} прид(о)ста ^{40}. и выскакаша вси ^{41} из лодѣи . и ре^{ч̑} Ѡлгъ къ ^{42} Асколодови ^{І}. и Дирови . в(ы) ^{43}неста кнѧзѧ ни роду к(н^{ѧ̑})жѧ . но азъ єсмь роду к(н^{ѧ̑})жа . и вынесоша Игорѧ ^{К}. сь ^{44} сн҃ъ Рюриковъ . и оубиша Асколода ^{І} ^{45}. и Дир^{д̑}а ^{46} ^{Г}. и несоша на гору ^{47} .єже с(ѧ) нн҃ѣ зоветь Оугорьско(є) ^{1} . Ѡлминъ дворъ . на то(и) ^{2} могилѣ поставилъ божницю ^{А} ст҃го Николы . а Дир^{д̑}ова ^{3} ^{Д} могила за ст҃(о)ю Ѡриною . и сѣде Ѡлегъ . кнѧжа в Кыєвѣ . и ре^{ч̑}Ѡлегъ . се буди мт҃(и) городо^{м̑} ^{4}Ру^{с̑}скымъ . и бѣша оу него Словѣни . и В(а)рѧзи . и прочии прозвашасѧ Русью . се ^{5} же Ѡлегъ нача городы стави^{т̑} . и оустави дани Словѣн^{м̑}(о) ^{6} /л.10/ и Кривичемъ . и Мерѧмъ . и оустави Варѧго^{м̑} дань даӕти . ѿ Новагорода . т҃ . гр^{и̑}венъ на лѣ^{т̑} . мира дѣлѧ єже до см҃рти Ӕрославлѧ даӕше ^{7} Варѧго^{м̑}	Варіанты: ^{32} Х. опущено. ^{33} Х. приб. и пріиде къ смоленскоу и с кривичи. ^{34} Х. опущено. ^{35} Х. дирь. ^{36} Х. молода. ^{37} Х. дироу. ^{38} Х. пріидита. ^{39} Х. дирь. ^{40} Х. пріидоста. ^{41} Х. приб. прочіи. ^{42} Х. опущено.^{43} Х. вы. ^{44} Х. а се. ^{45} Х. асколда. ^{46} Х. дира. ^{47} Х. приб. и погребоша на горѣ. ^{1} Х. оугорское идеже ннѣ. ^{2} Х. тои. ^{3} Х. дирова. ^{4} Х. градовом. ^{5} Х. сеи. ^{6} Х. словеном. ^{7} Х. дааху.
Notes to the original text, 1908
^{Д} Въ словѣ весь буква е вставлена надъ строкой. ^{Е} На правомъ полѣ приписано смольнескъ. ^{Ж} Вторая буква д въ Дирдъ новою рукою, потомъ соскоблена. ^{З} Правый край страницы заклеенъ и потому концы строкъ пропадаютъ; дополненныя буквы заключены здѣсь въ скобки. ^{И} Послѣ жи въ княжича стерты двѣ буквы чи. ^{І} Въ асколодови, асколода о переправлено въ ъ. ^{К} Въ игоря я передѣлано изъ а. ^{Л} Буква ж передѣлана изъ з.^{М} Здѣсь буква В оторвана съ краемъ листа.^{А} Слово божницю зачеркнуто и надъ нимъ написано: олма црквь. ^{Д} Буква д въ дирдова надписана другой рукой.
Translation of notes
^{Д} In the word весь letter е is inserted above the line ^{Е} On the right margin is inscribed смольнескъ (Smolensk, city). ^{Ж} Second letter д in Дирдъ (Dir) written by a new hand, then scratched off. ^{З} The right edge of the page is taped and therefore the ends of the lines are missing; the augmented letters are enclosed here in brackets. ^{И} After жи in княжича two letters чи are erased. ^{І} In асколодови, асколода letter о has been changed to ъ. ^{К} In игоря letter я is made from а. ^{Л} Letter ж is made from з.^{М} Here the letter В is torn off with the edge of the sheet.^{А} The word божницю is crossed out and above it written: олма црквь. ^{Д} The letter д in дирдова (Dir's) is written by another hand.
Translation to English:
In the summer (year) of 6390 (year 882) Oleg set forth, taking with him many warriors from among the Varangians, the Chuds, the Slavs, the Merians and all^{A} the (23) Krivichians. He thus arrived with his Krivichians before Smolensk, captured the city, and set up a garrison there. Thence he went on and captured Lyubech, where he also set up a garrison. He then came to the hills of Kiev and saw how Askold and Dir reigned there. He hid his warriors in the boats, left some others behind, and went forward himself bearing the child Igor'. He thus came to the foot of the Hungarian hill, and after concealing his troops, he sent messengers to Askold and Dir, representing himself as a stranger^{B} on his way to Greece on an errand for Oleg and for Igor the prince's son, and requesting that they should come forth to greet them as members of their race^{C}. Askold and Dir straightway came forth. Then all the soldiery jumped out of the boats, and Oleg said to Askold and Dir, "You are not princes nor even of princely stock, but I am of princely birth." Igor' was then brought forward, and Oleg announced that he was the son of Rurik^{D}. They killed Askold and Dir, and after carrying them to the hill, they buried them there, on the hill now known as Hungarian, where the castle of Ol'ma (likely Álmos) now stands. Over that tomb, Ol'ma built a church dedicated to St. Nicholas, but Dir's tomb is behind St. Irene's. Oleg set himself up as prince in Kiev, and declared that it should be the mother of Russian^{Е} cities. The Varangjans, Slavs, and others who accompanied him were called Russes. Oleg began to build stockaded towns, and (24) imposed tribute on the Slavs, the Krivichians, and the Merians. He commanded that Novgorod should pay the Varangians tribute to the amount of 300 grivnÿ a year for the preservation of peace. This tribute was paid to the Varangians until the death of Yaroslav.
Notes to The Primary Chronicle
23. The Hungarian hill (Uhorska Hora) at Kiev is traditionally located on the west bank of the Dnieper just north of the Crypt Monastery and beyond Berestovo, some two kilometers south of the Podol, or riverside section of the city; cf. N. Zakrevsky, Opisanie Kieva (Moscow, 1868), pp. 191–198.; 24. St. Irene's, constructed by Yaroslav the Wise ca. 1040, was situated slightly southwest of the extant Cathedral of St. Sophia. Its ground plan has been established by excavation; cf. Alpatov-Brunov, Altrussische Kunst (Augsburg, 1932), p. 17, with literature.
Comments to the English translation
This translation is based on the English version published by the late Professor Samuel Hazzard Cross in Volume XII (1930) of the Harvard Studies and Notes in Philology and Literature. The translation may also have some inaccuracies or points that should be clarified^{A} – The Old Slavonic text uses the word Весь while listing the tribes who participated with Oleg on his journey to Kiev from Novgorod. The word весь (ves') translates as "all" and "whole". But in the context of the enumeration of ancient Slavic and Finno-Ugric tribes, it most likely meant the tribe Ves' (Vepsians), which is spelled exactly the same.^{B} – The original text says "гостьє єсмы" which translates as "we are guests". The interpretation of the word "guests" differs among translations, some English sources interpret it as "strangers" while some Slavic sources interpret it as "merchants".^{C} – The word "race" does not accurately convey the meaning of the word "род". A closer translation would be "kinsfolk" or "kin". Askold, Dir and Oleg were all Norse.^{D} – We can't say for certain if Igor was a son of Rurik or just of his kin. Rurik is a legendary personality, the founder of the Rurikid dynasty, the first known prince of Novgorod, there are a lot of unknowns and a lot of theories around him. Some historians go as far as suggesting that the author of Primary Chronicle wrote a politically biased work to legitimize the rule of the Rurikid dynasty and create a legend for them. This is possible because who is the author of the Primary Chronicle is also a matter of dispute.^{Е} – The modern word "Russian" didn't exist at the time, it was developed much later on. The sources that use the word "Russian" instead of the historical terms Russes, Rhos, Rusiches or Rus' when working with annals are politically biased. Equating all ancient eastern Slavs with Russians is incorrect, the people of Rus' were a big ethnic mix.

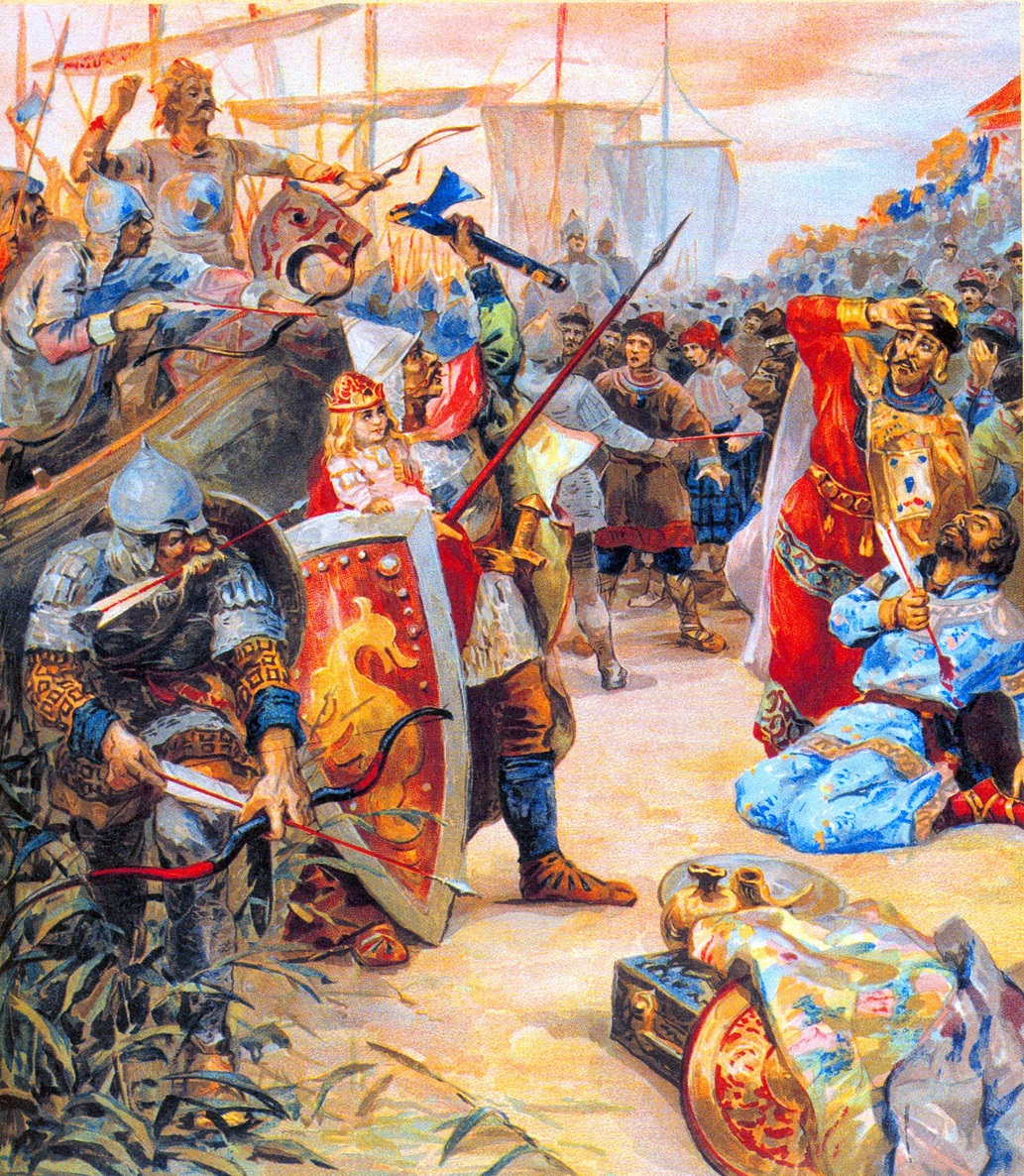
The murder of Askold and Dir (Painting by Klavdiy Lebedev, late 19th century)

Vasily Tatishchev, Boris Rybakov and some other Russian and Ukrainian historians interpreted the 882 coup d'état in Kiev as the reaction of the pagan Varangians to Askold's baptism. Tatishchev went so far as to style Askold "the first Rus' martyr". Igor was still "very young", and Oleg was "carrying" him to Kiev.

In the Novgorod First Chronicle, it was not Oleg, but Igor who initiated the actions: telling Askold that he, unlike Igor himself, was not a prince or of a princely clan, Igor and his soldiers killed Askold and Dir, and then Igor rather than Oleg became prince in Kiev. There is also no mention of Kiev being proclaimed as the "mother of Rus' cities". Igor went on to impose tributes on various tribes, and brought himself a wife named Olga from Pleskov (Pskov), with whom he had a son called Sviatoslav. Ostrowski (2018) noted that this is rather different from the narrative in the Primary Chronicle, where Oleg is in charge while Igor is passive and not mentioned again until 23 later: "As Igor’ grew up, he followed after Oleg, and obeyed his instructions", and Olga "was brought to him from Pskov" to be his bride. In the subsequent Rusʹ–Byzantine War (907) (absent in Byzantine sources), the Novgorod First Chronicle again narrates that it was Igor leading the attack (Old East Slavic: Посла князь Игорь на ГрЂкы вои В Русь скыдеи тысящь. "Prince Igor went against the Greeks with thousands of Rus' warriors."), yet the Primary Chronicle once more claims: "Oleg went against the Greeks, leaving Igor’ in Kiev."

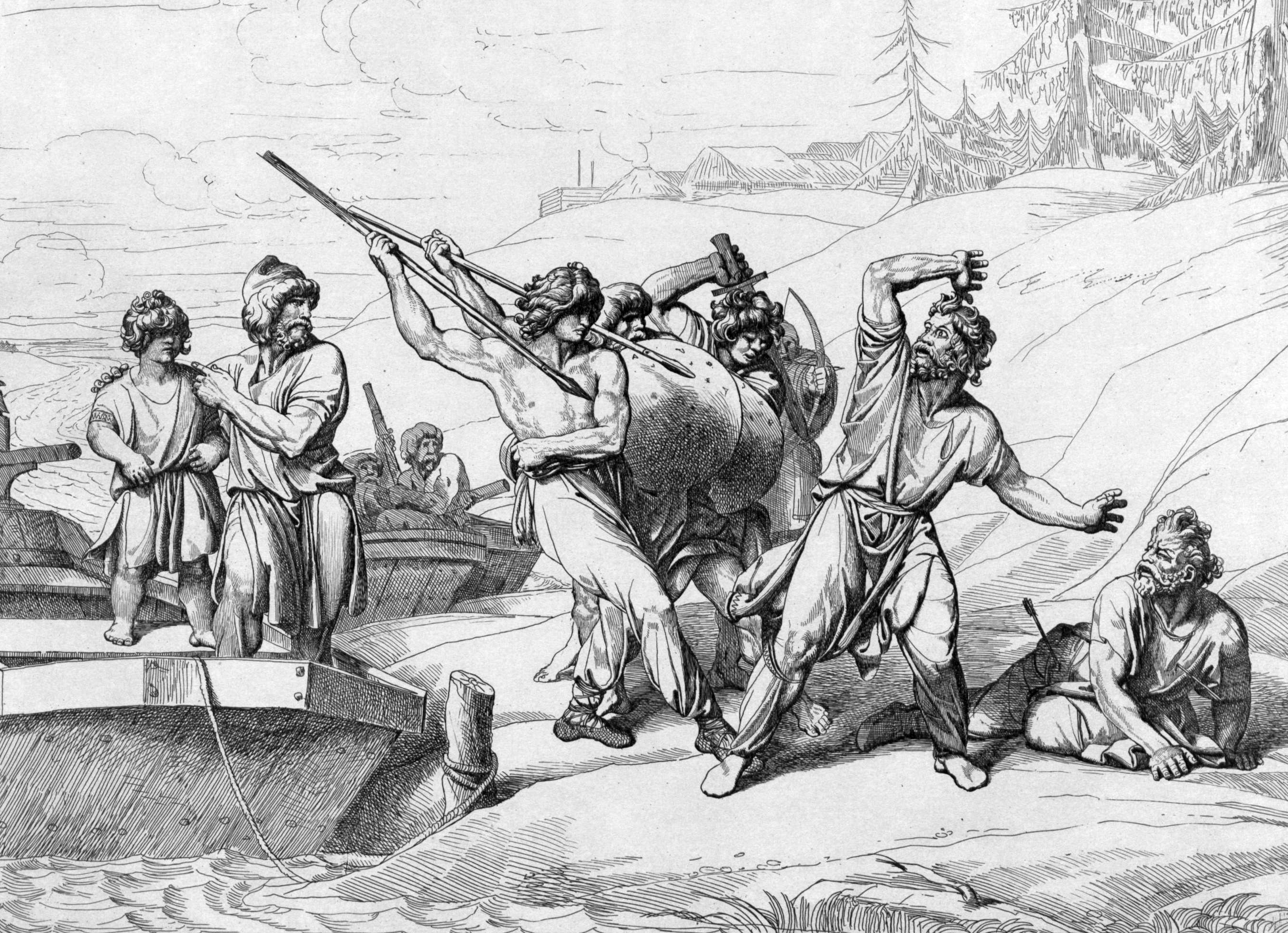
Death of Askold and Dir. Engraving by Fyodor Bruni, 1839

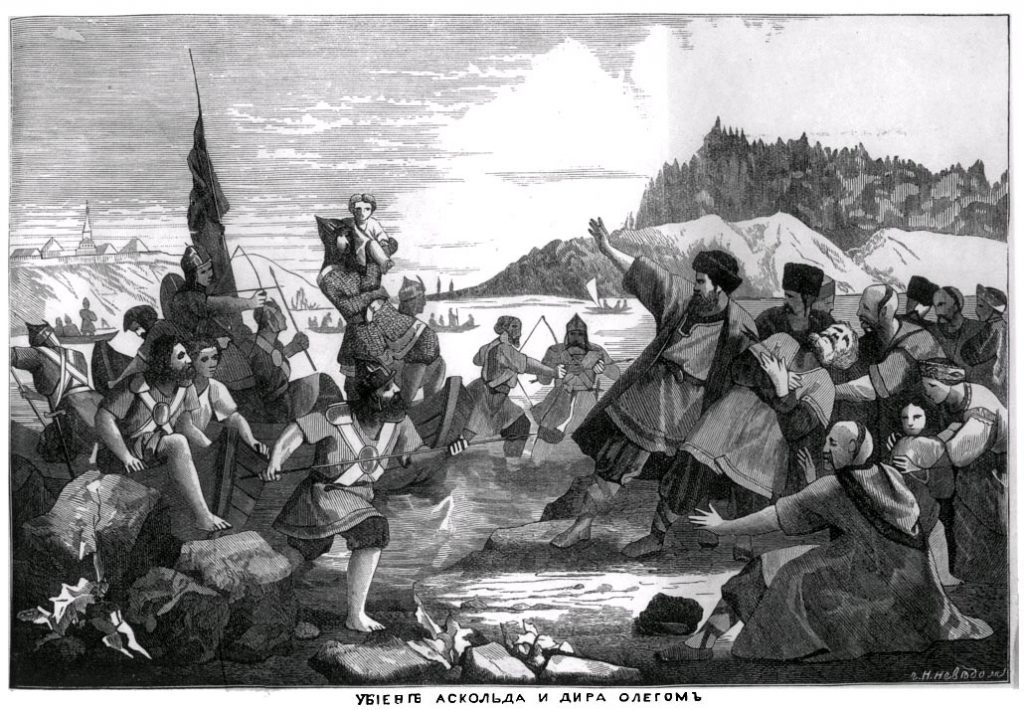
Author unknown. 19th century.

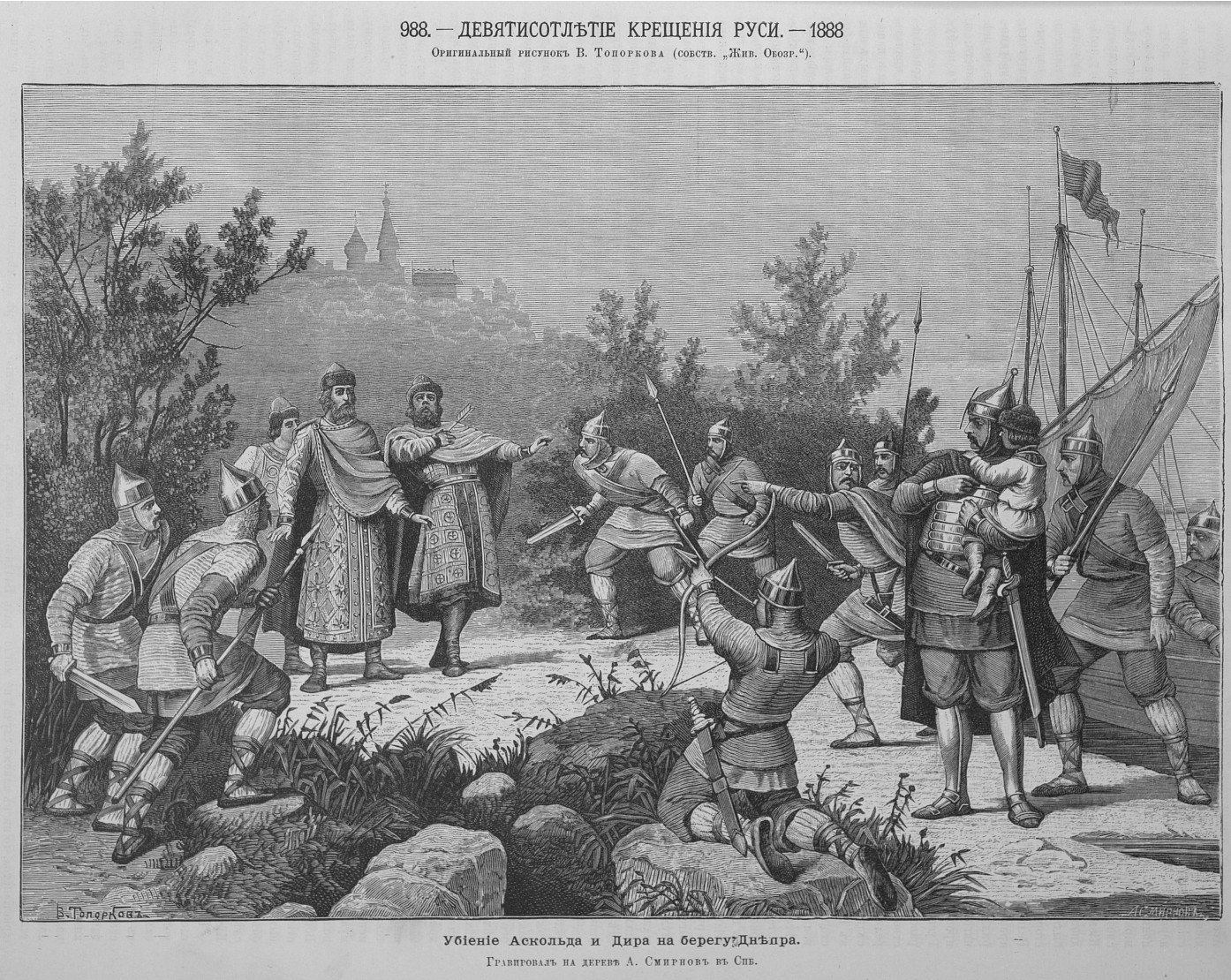
Drawing by V. Toporkov

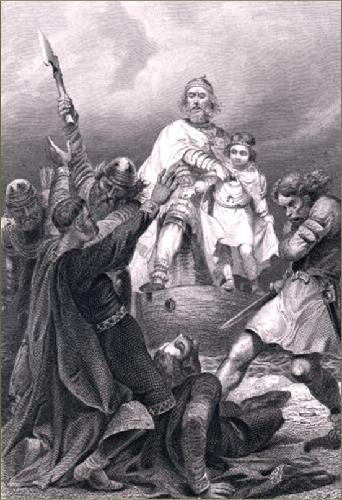
Death of Askold. Unknown artist of the late 19th century.

In Novgorod First Chronicle of the younger edition
Original text in Old East Slavic	Variants
По двою же лЂту умре ^{1} Синеусъ и брат его Труворъ, и прия ^{2}власть единъ Рюрикъ, обою брату власть, и нача ^{3} владЂти единъ. И роди сынъ, и нарече имя ему Игорь. И възрастъшю ^{4} же ему, Игорю, и бысть храборъ и мудръ. И бысть ^{5} у него воевода, именемъ Олегъ, муж мудръ и храборъ. И начаста воевати, и налЂзоста ДнЂпрь рЂку и Смолнескъ град ^{6}. И оттолЂ ^{7} поидоша ^{8}внизъ по ДнЂпру ^{9}, /л.30./ и приидоша къ горам кыевъскым ^{10}, и узрЂста городъ ^{11} Кыевъ ^{12}, и испыташа ^{13}, кто в немъ княжить; и рЂша: «два брата, Асколдъ ^{14} и Диръ». Игорь же и Олегъ, творящася мимоидуща, и потаистася въ лодьях, и с малою дружиною излЂзоста на брегъ, творящася ^{15} подугорьскыми ^{15}гостьми, и съзваста ^{16} Асколда и Дира. СлЂзъшима ^{17} же има, выскакаша ^{18} прочии воины з ^{19} лодЂи ^{19}, Игоревы, на брегъ; и рече Игорь ко ^{20} Асколду: «вы нЂста князя, ни роду княжа, нь ^{21}азъ есмь князь, и мнЂ достоить ^{22} княжити». И убиша Асколда и Дира; и абие ^{23} несъше ^{24} на гору, и ^{25} погребоша и ^{26} Асколда на горЂ, еже ся нынЂ ^{А} ^{27} Угорьское ^{28} наричеть ^{29}, идеже ^{30} есть дворъ Олминъ ^{31}; на тои могылЂ постави Олма ^{32} церковь святого Николу, а Дирева могыла ^{33} за святою Ириною. И сЂде Игорь, княжа ^{34}, в КыевЂ ^{35}; и бЂша у него Варязи ^{36} мужи ^{36}СловенЂ ^{37}, и оттолЂ ^{38} прочии ^{Б} прозвашася ^{39} Русью. Сеи же Игорь нача грады ставити, и дани ^{40} устави ^{40} Словеномъ ^{41} и Варягомъ даяти ^{41}, и Кривичемъ и Мерямъ дань даяти Варягомъ, а от Новагорода ^{42} 300 ^{43} гривенъ ^{43} на лЂто мира дЂля, еже не дають.	^{1} умрЂ ^{2} приа ^{3} начаша ^{4} възрастъшу ^{5} бысь ^{6} городъ ^{7} оттуду ^{8} поидоста ^{9} днепру ^{10} киевъским ^{11} град ^{12} киевъ сущъ ^{13} испытавъ ^{14} аскоад ^{15}—^{15} под угорьскими, творящеся ^{16} сзваста ^{17} слЂзшима с з над строкой ^{18} выскакаху ^{18}—^{18} из лодии ^{20} Нет ^{21} нъ ^{22} достоитъ ^{23} Нет ^{24} несоша ^{25} Нет ^{26} Нет ^{27} Нет ^{28} уское, причем между у и с оставлено чистое место ^{29} наричеться ^{30} идЂже ^{31} ольмин ^{32} ольма ^{33} могила ^{34} къняжа ^{35} киевЂ ^{36}—^{36} мужи варязЂ ^{37} словени ^{38} отолЂ ^{39} назвашася ^{40} —^{40} устави дани ^{41}—^{41} даати словеном и варягом ^{42} новаграда ^{43}—^{43} гривенъ триста
Notes to the text
^{А} В рукописи ннЂ и знак ̀ ̀ над строкой.^{Б} Написано на полях справа с выносным знаком тем же почерком и более светлыми чернилами.
Translation of notes to English
^{А} In the manuscript ннЂ and sigh ̀ ̀ are above the line.^{Б} Written on the right margin with a diacritic mark in the same handwriting and in lighter ink.
Translation of text to English
Two years later (in 862), Sineus and his brother Truvor died, and a man named Rurik took power, power of two brothers, and began to rule alone. He had a son, and named him Igor. As Igor grew up, he became brave and wise. He had a commander named Oleg, a wise and brave man. They began to wage wars, attacking the Dnieper River and the city of Smolensk. From there, they went down the Dnieper and reached the hills of Kiev, and behold the city of Kiev, and asked who ruled it; They found out it was ruled by two brothers, Askold and Dir. Igor and Oleg, pretending to be passing through, quietly hid their boats, and with a small squad landed on the shore, pretending to be Hungarian^{А} guests, and called for Askold and Dir. When they came down, other Igor's warriors leaped out of the boats to the shore; and Igor said to Askold, 'You are not a prince, nor of princely lineage, but I am the prince, and it is fitting for me to rule.' And they killed Askold and Dir, and carrying [them] up the hill, they buried Askold on the hill which is now called as Hungarian, where the Olma's court is; on that mound (grave) placed Olma the church to Saint Nicholas, and Dir's grave is behind Saint Irene's. And settled Igor to rule in Kiev; and he had Varangian men with him, Slavs, and the others who from then on called themselves as Rus'. Igor began establishing cities, and imposing tribute to be paid to the Slavs and Varangians^{B}, and he imposed tribute on the Krivichi and Meryans to be paid to the Varangians, and from Novgorod they received 300 hryvnias per year for peace, if they do not give.
Comments to the English translation
^{А}– the literal translation of "подугорьскыми гостьми" is "underhungarian guests" which could be interpreted as "guests from the lands near to Hungarians " or "guest from the lands under the rule of Hungarians"^{B} – "и дани устави Словеномъ и Варягомъ даяти" could also be translated as "and imposing tributes on the Slavs and Varangians"

Act	Novgorod First Chronicle (NPL)			Laurentian Codex (Lav)		
	Old East Slavic	Romanization	Modern English	Old East Slavic	Romanization	Modern English
Lineage; 23:14–16	и рече Игорь ко Асколду: "вы нЂста князя, ни роду княжа, нь азъ есмь князь, и мнЂ достоить княжити".	i reče Igorǐ ko Askoldu: "vy nđsta knjazja, ni rodu knjaža, nǐ azǔ esmǐ knjazǐ, i mnđ dostoitǐ knjažiti".	And Igor said to Askold: "Thou art not a prince, nor of a clan of princes, but I am a prince, and I am worthy to reign as prince."	и рече ѡлегъ асколду и дирови. вы нѣста кнѧзѧ. ни рода кнѧжа. но азъ есмь. роду кнѧжа.	i peče ôlegǔ askoldu insiroci. vy něsta knęzę. ni roda knęža. no azǔ esmǐ. rodu knęža.	and Oleg said to Askold and Dir, "You are not princes nor even of princely stock, but I am of princely birth."
Killing; 23:17–18	И убиша Асколда и Дира; и абие несъше на гору, и погребоша и Асколда на горЂ	I ubiša Askolda i Dira; i abie nesǔše na godu, i pogreboša i Askolda na gorđ	And they killed Askold and Dir; and he was taken to the mountain, and Askold was buried on the mountain	И убиша Асколда и Дира, несоша на гору и погребша и на горѣ.	I ubiša Askolda i Dira, nesoša na goru i pogrebša i na gorě.	And they killed Askold and Dir, and after carrying them to the hill, they buried them there
Prince in Kyev; 23:22–23	И сЂде Игорь, княжа, в КыевЂ.	I sđde Igorǐ, knjaža, v Kyevđ.	And Igor, the prince, went to Kyevđ.	сѣде ѡлегъ кнѧжа въ киевѣ. и реч ѡлегъ се буди м҃ти градомъ руским.	sěde ôlegǔ knęža vǔ kievě. i reč ôlegǔ se budi m'ti gradomǔ ruskim.	Oleg set himself up as prince in Kyiv, and declared that it should be the mother of Rus' cities.

=== Al-Masudi ===
The only foreign source to mention one of the co-rulers is the Arab historian Al-Masudi. According to him, "king al-Dir [Dayr] was the first among the kings of the Slavs." Although some scholars have tried to prove that "al-Dir" refers to a Slavic ruler and Dir's contemporary, this speculation is questionable and it is at least equally probable that "al-Dir" and Dir were the same person. Following his works, historians believe that Dir ruled after Askold, mainly in the 870—880s. In that case, on entering Kyiv, Oleg's soldiers killed just Dir while Askold had died earlier.

== Facts and records ==
The Rus' attack on Constantinople in June 860 took the Greeks by surprise, "like a thunderbolt from heaven," as it was put by Patriarch Photios in his famous oration written for the occasion. Although the Slavonic chronicles tend to associate this expedition with the names of Askold and Dir (and to date it to 866), the connection remains tenuous. Despite Photius' own assertion that he sent a bishop to the land of Rus' which became Christianized and friendly to Byzantium, most historians discard the idea of Askold's subsequent conversion as apocryphal.

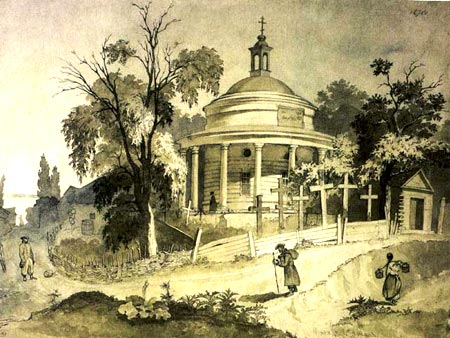
Church of St. Nicholas in the Askold's Grave park in Kyiv (sketch by Taras Shevchenko, 1846)

We may suppose that the names of Rurik and his kin, of Askold and Dir, and of Oleg and Igor' survived in popular legend at Kiev in somewhat the same fashion as the heroes of the later bÿlinÿ. The problem for the author of the Primary Chronicle was to extract from these fragmentary survivals the semblance of an historical account. While there may be some conceivable doubt whether Rurik and his relatives, and possibly Askold and Dir, were actual personages, Oleg and Igor are soundly attested, presumably with dates, by the treaties with the Greeks in which they are mentioned by name. So the existence of Askold and Dir should be taken with a pinch of salt, as these two rulers were semi-legendary personalities, and the existence of Rurik should be taken with an even bigger pinch of salt, as he was a legendary personality in history.

A Kievan legend identifies Askold's burial mound with Uhorska Hora (Hungarian hill), where Olga of Kiev later built two churches, devoted to Saint Nicholas and to Saint Irene. Today this place on the steep bank of the Dnieper is marked by a monument called Askold's Grave.

== The name Askold ==
=== Askold ===
Also — Oskold, Oskol'd, Oskolod. (Осколд, Оскольд, Осколод)

There are several versions of the origin of the name Askold. The most likely version interprets it as the Norse name Haskuldr or Höskuldr. However, the spelling Askold may only be a change in the Scandinavian manner (similar to Vytautas – Vitold)." According to professor Igor Danilevsky, who is a specialist on the history of Kievan Rus, the Scandinavian origin of the name is certain and it has long been proved.

G. Magner defended the theory of the Slavic origin of the name, deriving it from the word "skoldyryt" – to accumulate. Other supporters of the theory of Slavic origin saw in the word the roots oskal (grin), sokol (falcon), kol (spike) and kolo (circle). It is also possible that the part -old is a contraction of -volod/-vlad (lord, ruler). This hypothesis does not contradict the data of modern historical grammar.

Boris Rybakov expressed a conjecture that the appearance of the names of Askold and Dir in the annals is a consequence of an error of one of the early chroniclers. Allegedly, in fact, in the original text it was about one Kievan prince Askoldyr or more precisely Oskoldyr. In this case, Dir did not exist at all. But such a reading of the annalistic text is the result of an assumption that has no textual basis according to Igor Danilevsky's assertion. It did, however, allow Rybakov to "establish" the Slavic etymology of the name Askold from the names of the rivers Oskil and Vorskla (in chronicle Voroskol). The name of the Oskil (Oskol) river, in turn, was associated by B. A. Rybakov with the Black Sea tribe of the "royal" Scythians, the Scolots, mentioned by Herodotus. Those were allegedly Slavs (contrary to Herodotus himself, who wrote that the Skolots called themselves Scythians), who later began to call themselves Rus'.

"Askolt" may be a borrowed word from Iranian-speaking nomads and mean "Border ruler."

=== Anti-Normanism ===
A direction in Russian pre-Soviet, Soviet and post-Soviet historiography, whose supporters deny the role of the Scandinavians in the creation of the Rus' state or deny at all any participation of the Scandinavians (Normans) in the socio-political life of Rus'; reject and seek to refute the "Norman theory" of the creation of the Kievan Rus'. Anti-Normanist historians denied the Scandinavian (Old Norse) origin of the name Askold. Anti-Normanism includes a wide range of concepts and hypotheses, the common features of which are the denial of the essentiality of the influence of the Scandinavians on the political and economic processes of the formation of ancient Rus' and the advancement of alternative Norman hypotheses.

A number of late medieval sources, among them the Kievan Synopsis (1674), report that Oskold was the last representative of the local dynasty of Prince Kyi. Referring to these annalistic evidences, Aleksey Shakhmatov considered the fact of the Slavic origin of Prince Oskold beyond doubt. Among the researchers of the 20th century this idea was shared by professor Mikhail Tikhomirov, and professor Rybakov, in confirmation of the Slavic origin of the prince, the name Oskold derived from the name of the river Oskil, and therefore in his opinion it would be correct to use not "Askold", but exactly "Oskold", as it is found in the Old Rus' chronicles (or "Oskolod" – as indicated in the Nikiforov Chronicle of the 15th century, Suprasl Chronicle of the 16th century or medieval Polish chronicle of Maciej Stryjkowski).

Historian F. Donald Logan wrote:

The controversies over the nature of the Rus and the origins of the Rus' state have bedevilled Viking studies, and indeed Russian history, for well over a century. It is historically certain that the Rus were Swedes. The evidence is incontrovertible, and that a debate still lingers at some levels of historical writing is clear evidence of the holding power of received notions. The debate over this issue – futile, embittered, tendentious, doctrinaire – served to obscure the most serious and genuine historical problem which remains: the assimilation of these Viking Rus into the Slavic people among whom they lived. The principal historical question is not whether the Rus were Scandinavians or Slavs, but, rather, how quickly these Scandinavian Rus became absorbed into Slavic life and culture… in 839, the Rus were Swedes; in 1043 the Rus were Slavs.

According to the historian and archaeologist L. S. Klein, the "Norman theory" or "Normanism" never existed as a scientific concept, while Anti-Normanism exists, but is primarily an ideological platform based on an inferiority complex. Anti-Normanism is distinctive for Russia.

== Origins of Askold and Dir ==
Some historians, based on late and unreliable sources, try to declare Askold and Dir to be direct heirs of the legendary Kyi, a representative of the dynasty of "Kievichi". The existence of this "princely dynasty" is based on the information of the Polish historian of the 15th century Jan Dlugosz, who wrote that the chronicle's Kievan princes Askold and Dir, killed by Igor (according to the Primary Chronicle killed by Oleg), were descendants of Kyi. This message of Dlugosz was used in the works of Dmitry Ilovaysky (who treated the facts quite arbitrarily) and Mykhailo Hrushevsky (who strove to prove the existence of a distinct Ukrainian ethnos already in the 4th century); Aleksey Shakhmatov also referred to them in his historical reconstructions. However, this point of view is rarely supported by specialists.

The mention by Jan Dlugosz of the family ties of Askold and Dir with the legendary Kyi raises serious doubts. According to Vladimir Petrukhin: "Jan Dlugosz was not so naive as some modern authors who uncritically accepted his conclusions. The fact is that the Polish chronicler sought to substantiate the claims of the Polish state on Kiev and therefore associated the Kiev Polans with Polish Polans, considered Kyi a "Polish pagan prince", etc." Therefore, we have no grounds to believe that Askold and Dir belonged to the "dynasty of Kievichi" (or even were Slavs).

== Legacy ==
- Russian screw frigate Askold (1854) (see List of Russian steam frigates)
- Russian cruiser Askold (1900)
- Askold's Grave (19th century Russian Opera by Alexey Verstovsky)
- In 2013 prince Askold was canonized by the synod of the Ukrainian Orthodox Church - Kyiv Patriarchate as a protomartyr.

== See also ==
- Kyi, Shchek and Khoryv
- Book of Veles

== Bibliography ==
=== Primary sources ===
- Cross, Samuel Hazzard; Sherbowitz-Wetzor, Olgerd P. (1930). The Russian Primary Chronicle, Laurentian Text. Translated and edited by Samuel Hazzard Cross and Olgerd P. Sherbowitz-Wetzor (1930) (PDF). Cambridge, Massachusetts: The Mediaeval Academy of America. p. 325.
  - Cross, Samuel Hazzard; Sherbowitz-Wetzor, Olgerd P. (2013) [1953]. SLA 218. Ukrainian Literature and Culture. Excerpts from The Rus' Primary Chronicle (Povest vremennykh let, PVL) (PDF). Toronto: Electronic Library of Ukrainian Literature, University of Toronto. p. 16. Archived from the original (PDF) on 30 May 2014.
- Ostrowski, Donald, ed. (2003). The Povest' vremennykh let: An Interlinear Collation and Paradosis. 3 volumes (in Russian and English). Cambridge, MA: Harvard University Press. Archived from the original on 9 March 2005. (assoc. ed. David J. Birnbaum (Harvard Library of Early Ukrainian Literature, vol. 10, parts 1–3) – This 2003 Ostrowski et al. edition includes an interlinear collation including the five main manuscript witnesses, as well as a new paradosis ("a proposed best reading").
  - Ostrowski, Donald; Birnbaum, David J. (7 December 2014). "Rus' primary chronicle critical edition – Interlinear line-level collation". pvl.obdurodon.org (in Church Slavic). Archived from the original on 28 April 2025. – A 2014 improved digitised version of the 2002/2003 Ostrowski et al. edition.
- Izbornyk (2001). "Новгородская Первая Летопись Младшего Извода" [Novgorod First Chronicle of the Younger Edition]. Izbornyk (in Church Slavic).

=== Literature ===
- Dimnik, Martin (January 2004). "The Title "Grand Prince" in Kievan Rus'". Mediaeval Studies. 66: 253–312. doi:10.1484/J.MS.2.306512.
- Ostrowski, Donald (2018). "Was There a Riurikid Dynasty in Early Rus'?". Canadian-American Slavic Studies. 52 (1): 30–49. doi:10.1163/22102396-05201009.
