= Krivichi (disambiguation) =

Krivichi were a tribal union of Early East Slavs between the 6th and the 12th centuries.

Krivichi may also refer to:

- Kryvichy, several inhabited localities in Belarus called 'Krivichi' in Russian
- Kryvychi, several inhabited localities in Ukraini called 'Krivichi' in Russian
