= The Legend of Sloven and Rus =

17th century Russian chronicle

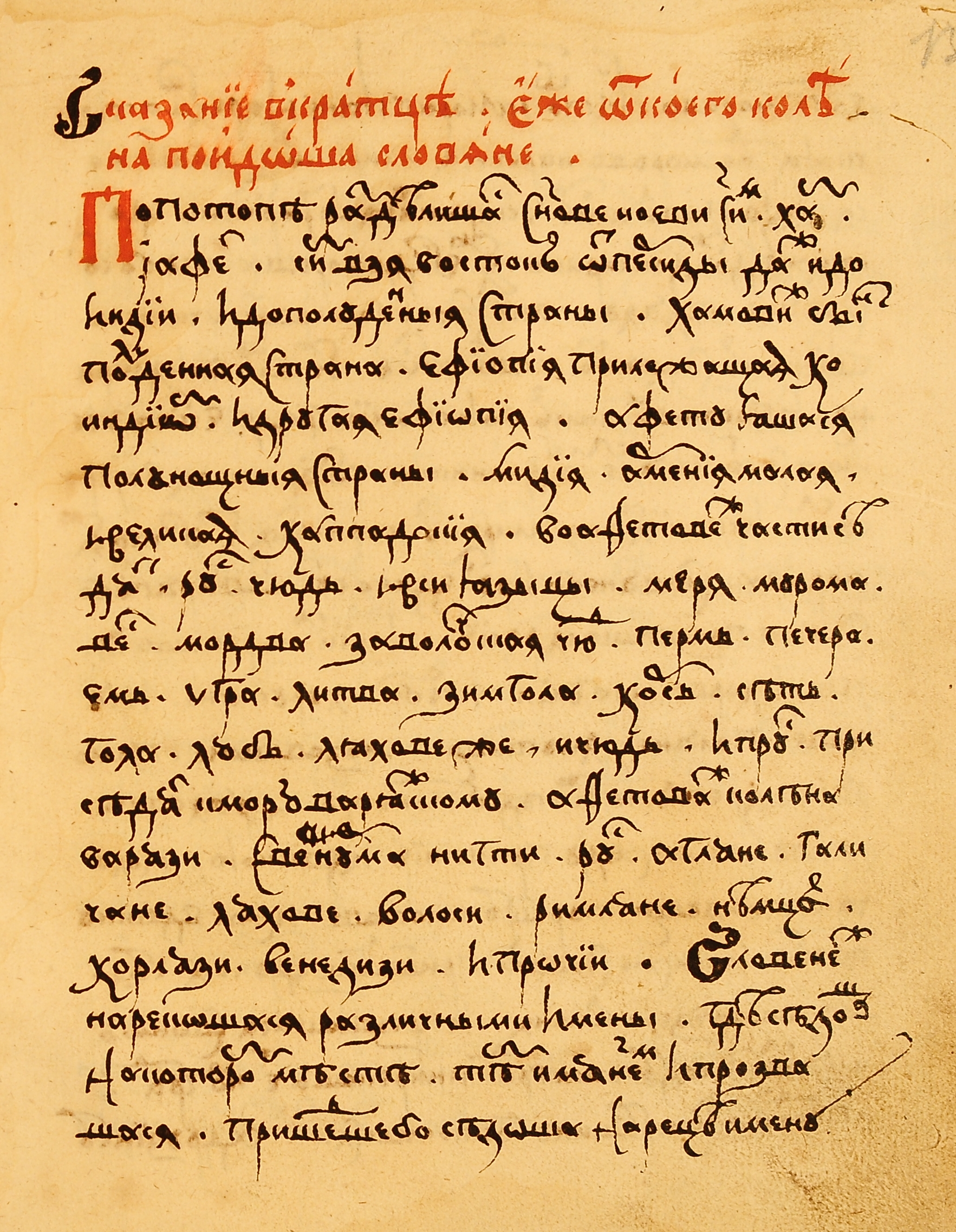
The legend of Sloven and Rus

The Legend of Sloven and Rus and the City of Slovensk (Note: Russian: Сказание о Словене и Русе и городе Словенске, romanized: Skazanie o Slovene i Ruse i gorode Slovenske.) is a late chronicle legend of the 17th century about the settlement of Novgorod's surroundings by the tribe of Slovenes, about the story of Rurik and epic ancestors of the Russian people.

== History of creation ==
Up to now, more than 100 transcriptions of The Legend (with variations in titles), dated mainly in the second half of the 17th century, have been discovered, including the annals of Patriarch Nikon of 1652–1658, in the Chronograph of 1679, in the Novgorod Third Chronicle, in the Mazurinsky Chronicle of Isidor Snazin, the Novgorod Zabelinska and the Pogodinsky Annals. Modern publications are often based on the list of the "Chronograph", 1679.

Historians A. Lavrentev and E. S. Galkina suggest that The Legend was compiled by the founder of the Siberian chronicle, Metropolitan Cyprian (1626–1634), although the versions about the migrations of Slovene and Rus, their relationships were known long before the 17th century. Thus, Arab-Persian authors from the 12th century cited the tales of Rus and Slavs using the eponyms Rus and Slav. Sometimes medieval authors retrospectively linked the Rus to earlier events up to the 14th century. From the 14th century in the West Slavic epic Czech, Lech and Rus (Mech) appears; the Byzantine author Simeon Logofet mentions Rus as the ancestor of the Russian people in the 10th century.

== Content ==
The Legend recalls stories from the times of Herodotus and Diodorus of Sicily about the origin of the Scythian people. The ancestors of the Russian people are named to be the princes Slovene and Rus – the descendants of Prince Skif. According to this "legend", in 3099, dating from the creation of the world (2409 BC), Slovene and Rus along with their families left their lands on the shores of the Black Sea in search of new ones, and after 14 years, they came to Lake Moisko (Ilmen), where Slovene established the city of Slovensk (modern Veliky Novgorod), and Rusa – the city of Rus (modern Staraya Russa).

The Legend gives explanations for hydronyms and place names in the Novgorod region from the names of the relatives of Slovene and Rus, mentions the resettlement of the Slavs at that time to the White Sea and the Urals, military campaigns against Egypt, Greece and other "barbarian" countries.

Next, The Legend narrates various mythical or legendary episodes about the history of Slavs, in particular, the negotiations of the Russian princes with Alexander the Great, the visit to Russia by the Apostle Andrew, wars with Ugrians and Bulgarians, the reign of Prince Gostomysl, and the calling of the Varangians. The Legend repeats the popular legend of the origin of Rurik from the Roman emperor Augustus. At the same time, the legend says that he was invited to rule the Russian land from the territory of Prussia.

== Usage ==
The legend was widely spread in the Moscow state in the 17th to 18th centuries; its retelling or similar information is contained in the Ioachim Chronicle, the works of P. N. Krekshin, M. V. Lomonosov, V. N. Tatishchev and others. Historians including N.M. Karamzin, N.I. Kostomarov and other domestic historians commented on the legend.

The plot of The Legend was used in the tale of V.A. Lyovshin, The Story of the Bogatyr (1780–1783).

== Sources ==
- Gilyarov, F. I. (1878). Traditions of the Russian Primary Chronicle (until 969 year). Sovremennye Izvestia. p. 325.
- Rybakov, B.A. (1968). Complete collection of Russian annals. Nauka.
- Popov, Andrei (1869). The selection of Slavic and Russian works and articles contributed to the chronographs of the Russian edition (1st ed.). Moscow: Mamontova and Co. p. 541.
