= Kyi dynasty =

Semi-legendary dynasty of Polans

The Kyi dynasty, also known as the Kyivites (Ukrainian: Києвичі, romanized: Kyievychi) was allegedly a dynasty of early medieval Polans rulers of Kyiv.

== Accounts in the Primary Chronicle ==
According to page 10.15–16 of the Primary Chronicle, after the deaths of the legendary founders of Kyiv – Kyi, Shchek, Khoryv and their sister Lybid' – their родъ (rodŭ; "clan" or "gens") 'assumed the supremacy among the Polyanians'. (Note: И по сеи братьи почаша дьржати родъ ихъ къняжение въ Поляхъ.) However, this is directly contradicted by pages 16.21–17.3, which say: 'After this time, and subsequent to the death of the three brothers in Kyiv, the Polyanians were oppressed by the Derevlians and other neighbors of theirs. Then the Khazars came upon them as they lived in the hills and forests, and demanded tribute from them' (Note: По сихъ же лѣтѣхъ, по съмьрти братия сея быша обидими Деревляны и инѣми окольными. И наидоша я Козаре, сѣдящая на горахъ въ лѣсѣхъ, и рекоша Козаре: "Платите намъ дань."). In pages 20.24–21.3, Askold and Dir are told by the inhabitants: "There were three brothers, Kyi, Shchek, and Khoriv, who had once built this city. They died, and we, their descendants, are living here, and paying tribute to the Khazars.'

== M. Braychevskyi's hypothesis ==
M. Braichevsky's hypothesis is based on the rather popular in Soviet science identification of Kyi with Quar Zenob Glack and Kuver Byzantine chronicles. "The biography of the real Kyi-Kuar-Kuver is historically determined. The 430s, as we already know, were indeed a turning point in the history of the Slavic peoples. In the west, as a result of the stubborn struggle against the Avar supremacy, the state of Samo emerges; in the east - the Kyivan Rus… Askold was a descendant of that semi-legendary Kyi-Kuar-Kuver." The dating of Kyi's life and activity will be acceptable, as will the identification of Kyi with Quar. Kuver's connection with Kyiv is doubtful, the former is now mostly associated with the Proto-Bulgarians.

== Khorezmian hypothesis of V. Toporov ==
V. Toporov, without directly touching on the topic of the Kyivan dynasty, presented his own hypothesis about the origin of the toponym "Kyiv" (advocated by the late Omeljan Pritsak), namely: "Al-Masudi's report on the Khazar army and its leader, promoted to the rank of wazir, named Aḥmadu 'bnu Kūyah, ie Ahmad, son of Kui, was analyzed. Given the hereditary nature of this position, we can assume that Ahmad was preceded in this position by his father Kūya, who held this position in the last decades of the 9th century and at the beginning of the 10th century in Kyiv." That is, according to V. Toporov, he believes the Kyiv dynasty did not exist, the name of Kyiv comes from the name of the leader of the Khorezmian army, which was in the service of the Khazars.

== Place of Askold and Dir ==
Some writers have claimed that Askold and Dir belonged to the Kyi dynasty. The 15th-century Polish chronicler Jan Długosz wrote: 'Later, after the deaths of Kyi, Shchek and Khoryv, their sons and descendants inherited from the Kyivan Rus' for many years, until such descendants led to two brothers - Oskald and Dir.' This claim has not been taken seriously by most modern scholars. In his 2006 book Origins of the Slavic Nations, Serhii Plokhy paraphrased the Primary Chronicle as saying that 'the Polianians had their own ruling dynasty established by the three brothers Kyi, Shchek, and Khoryv, who founded the city of Kyiv. (...) Once the Kyi dynasty died out, the Polianians paid tribute to the Khazars. Then they were ruled by the Varangian warriors Askold and Dir' (...). If there had been any dynasty, it had long gone extinct by the time Askold and Dir arrived, who were Varangians and not local Polianians. In his 2017 book The Gates of Europe: A History of Ukraine, however, Plokhy no longer mentions Kyi and his siblings, relegating them to the realm of legend.

== Bibliography ==
- Bibliography of Russian history

=== Primary sources ===
- Cross, Samuel Hazzard; Sherbowitz-Wetzor, Olgerd P. (1953). The Russian Primary Chronicle, Laurentian Text. Translated and edited by Samuel Hazzard Cross and Olgerd P. Sherbowitz-Wetzor (PDF). Cambridge, Massachusetts: The Mediaeval Academy of America. p. 325. (First edition published in 1930. The first 50 pages are a scholarly introduction.)
  - Cross, Samuel Hazzard; Sherbowitz-Wetzor, Olgerd P. (2013) [1953]. SLA 218. Ukrainian Literature and Culture. Excerpts from The Rus' Primary Chronicle (Povest vremennykh let, PVL) (PDF). Toronto: Electronic Library of Ukrainian Literature, University of Toronto. p. 16. Archived from the original (PDF) on 30 May 2014.
- Ostrowski, Donald; Birnbaum, David J. (7 December 2014). "Rus' primary chronicle critical edition – Interlinear line-level collation". pvl.obdurodon.org (in Church Slavic). Archived from the original on 28 April 2025. – A 2014 improved digitised version of the 2002/2003 Ostrowski et al. edition.
- Thuis, Hans (2015). Nestorkroniek. De oudste geschiedenis van het Kievse Rijk (in Dutch). Nijmegen: Uitgeverij Vantilt. p. 304. ISBN 9789460042287.

=== Literature ===
- Gunnarsson, Valur (7 January 2021). "Origin Stories: The Kyivan Rus in Ukrainian Historiography". Skemman.
- Plokhy, Serhii (2006). The Origins of the Slavic Nations: Premodern Identities in Russia, Ukraine, and Belarus (PDF). New York: Cambridge University Press. pp. 10–15. ISBN 978-0-521-86403-9. Archived (PDF) from the original on 6 June 2011.
- Брайчевський М. Ю. Вибране. Т. II: Хозарія і Русь. Аскольд — цар київський. К.: Вид. ім. Олени Теліги, 2009.
- Голб Н., Прицак О. Хазаро-еврейские документы X в. Москва-Иерусалим, 1997.
- Топоров В. Н. Об иранском элементе в русской духовной культуре. Славянский и балканский фольклор. М.: «Наука», 1989
- Свод древнейших письменных известий о славянах. Т. ІІ. М., 1995.
