= Kryvychi =

Kryvychi (Ukrainian: Кривичі) may refer to the following places in Ukraine:

- Kryvychi, Lviv Raion, Lviv Raion
- Kryvychi, Rivne Raion, Rivne Raion

== See also ==
- Krivichi (disambiguation)
