= Sergei Shtsherbakov =

Estonian politician

Sergei Shtsherbakov (7 September 1871, Izborsk – 6 April 1937) was an Estonian farmer and politician.

Shtsherbakov was born on 7 September 1871, in Izborsk, Petseri County. He received his education at a semester school and at various courses.

He was a Deputy Mayor of Pechory, and in the 1920s he was the assistant to the municipality of Pechory and the head of the county government's agricultural department. He was a member of the Riigikogu from 1923 to 1926 as a member of the Estonian Labour Party. He was also the chairman of the Petseri Laenu-Hoiu Ühispank and the honorary member of the Petseri Farmers' Society.

Following a heart attack, Shtsherbakov died on April 6, 1937, in his garden.
