= Valentin Strukov =

Estonian politician (born 1953)

Valentin Strukov (born 21 March 1953 in Irboska, Pskov Oblast) is an Estonian politician. He was a member of VIII Riigikogu.
