= Rurik =

Varangian chieftain of the Rus'

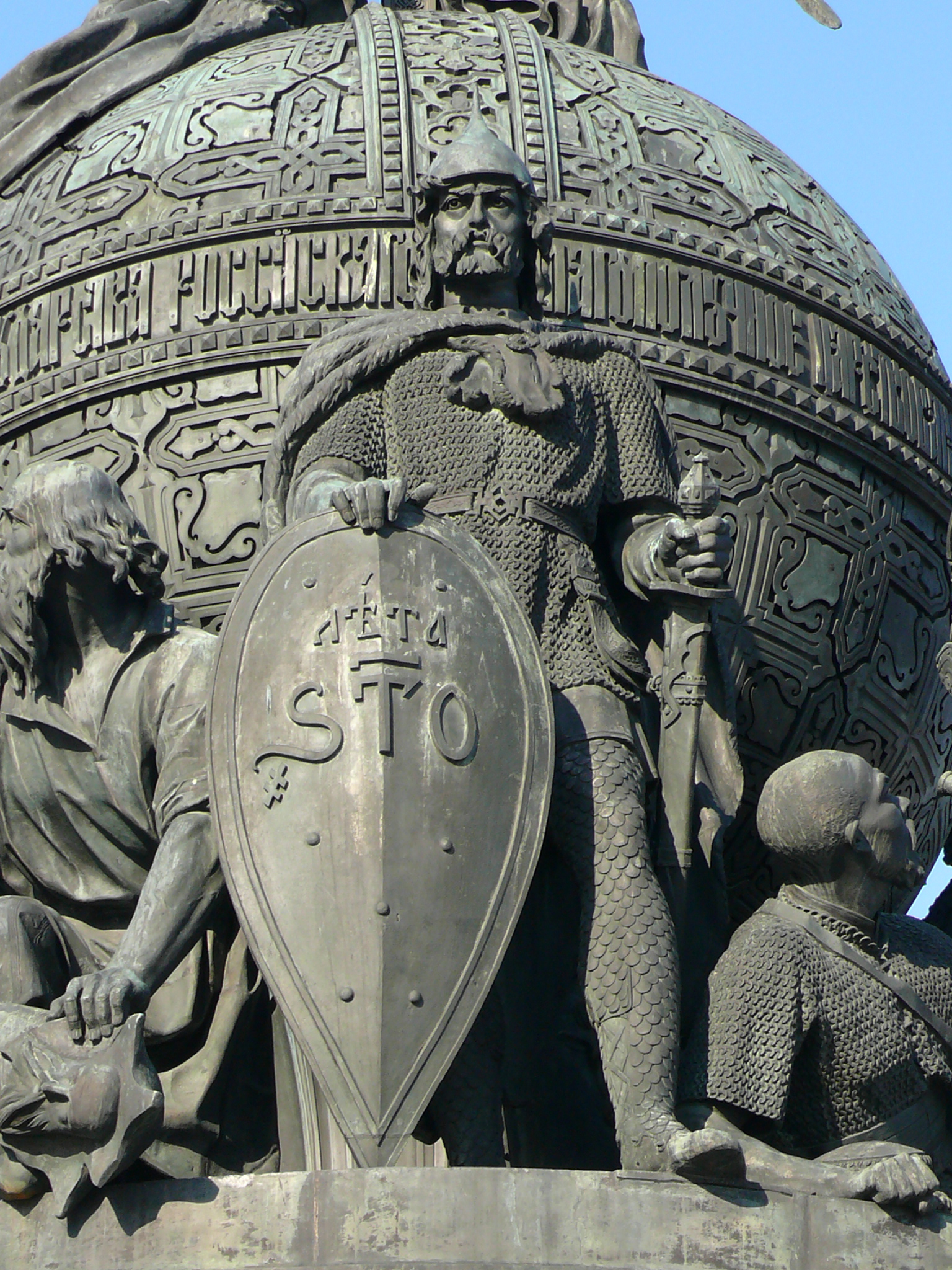
- Rurik on the 19th-century "Millennium of Russia" monument in Veliky Novgorod

Prince of Novgorod
- Reign: 862–879 (Note: Alternatively 870s; "[T]he 870s [are] the last decade in which Riurik presumably lived." "Riurik died some time in the 870s.")
- Successor: Oleg
- Died: 879; Novgorod
- Issue: Igor
- Dynasty: Rurik
- Religion: Norse paganism

Rurik (also spelled Rorik, Riurik or Ryurik; Church Slavonic: Рюрикъ, romanized: Rjurikŭ; (Note: Belarusian: Рурык, romanized: Ruryk, Russian: Рюрик, romanized: Ryurik, Ukrainian: Рюрик, romanized: Riuryk.) Old Norse: Hrøríkʀ; died 879) was a Varangian chieftain of the Rus' who, according to tradition, was invited to reign in Novgorod in the year 862. The Primary Chronicle states that Rurik was succeeded by his kinsman Oleg who was regent for his infant son Igor.

Traditionally, Rurik has been considered the founder of the Rurik dynasty, which was the ruling dynasty of Kievan Rus' and its principalities, and ultimately the Tsardom of Russia, until the death of Feodor I in 1598. As a result, he is considered to be the traditional founder of the Russian monarchy.

== Life ==
The earliest mention of Rurik is contained in the Primary Chronicle, traditionally ascribed to Nestor and compiled in c. 1113, which states that East Slavic and Finnic tribes in 860–862 (including the Chuds, Slovenes, Krivichs, Meryans and Ves) "drove the Varangians back beyond the sea, refused to pay them tribute, and set out to govern themselves". Afterwards the tribes started fighting each other and decided to invite the Varangians, led by Rurik, to reestablish order. Rurik came along with his younger brothers Sineus and Truvor and a large retinue.

According to the chronicle, Rurik was one of the Rus', a Varangian tribe. Most historians believe that the Rus' were of Scandinavian origin, more specifically from what is currently coastal eastern Sweden around the eighth century. According to the prevalent theory, the name Rus' is derived from an Old Norse term for "the men who row", from an older name for the Swedish coastal area of Roslagen.

Sineus established himself at Beloozero, and Truvor at the town of Izborsk. Truvor and Sineus died shortly after the establishment of their territories, and Rurik consolidated these lands into his own territory, extending his rule in northern Russia. Askold and Dir, followers of Rurik who were sent to Constantinople, seized Kiev before launching an attack recorded in Byzantine sources for the year 860.

The Laurentian Codex of 1377, which contains the oldest surviving version of the Primary Chronicle, states that Rurik first settled in Novgorod ("newtown"), while the Hypatian Codex of the 1420s states that Rurik first settled in Ladoga, before moving his seat of power to the newly founded city of Novgorod, a fort built not far from the source of the Volkhov River, where he stayed until his death.

Rurik is said to have remained in power until his death some time in the 870s. On his deathbed, Rurik bequeathed his realm to Oleg, who belonged to his kin, and entrusted to Oleg's hands his son Igor, for he was very young. Oleg moved the capital to Kiev (by murdering the then-rulers and taking the city) and founded the state of Kievan Rus', which was ruled by Rurik's successors (his son Igor and Igor's descendants). The state persisted until the Mongol invasion in 1240.

== Legacy ==
The Rurikids were the ruling dynasty of Kievan Rus', and ultimately the Tsardom of Russia, until 1598, and numerous noble families claim male-line descent from Rurik. He is considered to be the traditional founder of the Russian monarchy. The last Rurikid to rule Russia as tsar was Vasily IV, who reigned until 1610 and was from the House of Shuysky. The Romanovs were also related to the descendants of Rurik through marriage. The descendants of the princely families allegedly inherited from Rurik are still living.

The king Michał Korybut Wiśniowiecki reigned in the Polish–Lithuanian Commonwealth until 1673; a member of the House of Wiśniowiecki, who traditionally traced their descent to the Gediminids, recent studies side with a Rurikid origin of the House of Zbaraski and its cadet branches including the House of Wiśniowiecki.

== Historiography ==
The story of Rurik as told in the Primary Chronicle has been accepted in scholarship, in one form or another, as a reflection of real events, although the historicity of Rurik remains a subject of debate. It is commonly taken as the starting point for the history of Norse presence in Eastern Europe.

=== Alternative theories ===
The name Rurik is a form of the Old Norse name Hrœrekr. Rurik has by some been identified with Rorik of Dorestad, who was a member of one of two competing families reported by the Frankish chroniclers as having ruled the nascent Danish kingdom at Hedeby. After 860, Rorik of Dorestad disappears from western sources for a considerable period of time. In 862, according to Russian sources, Rurik arrived in the eastern Baltic. Rorik of Dorestad reappeared in Frankish chronicles in 870. In 882, Rorik is mentioned as dead (without a specific date of death). The Primary Chronicle places the death of Rurik of Novgorod in 879.

The idea of identifying Rurik of Rus' with Rorik of Dorestad was revived by the anti-Normanists Boris Rybakov and Anatoly H. Kirpichnikov in the mid-20th century, but Alexander Nazarenko and other scholars have objected to it.

== Gallery ==
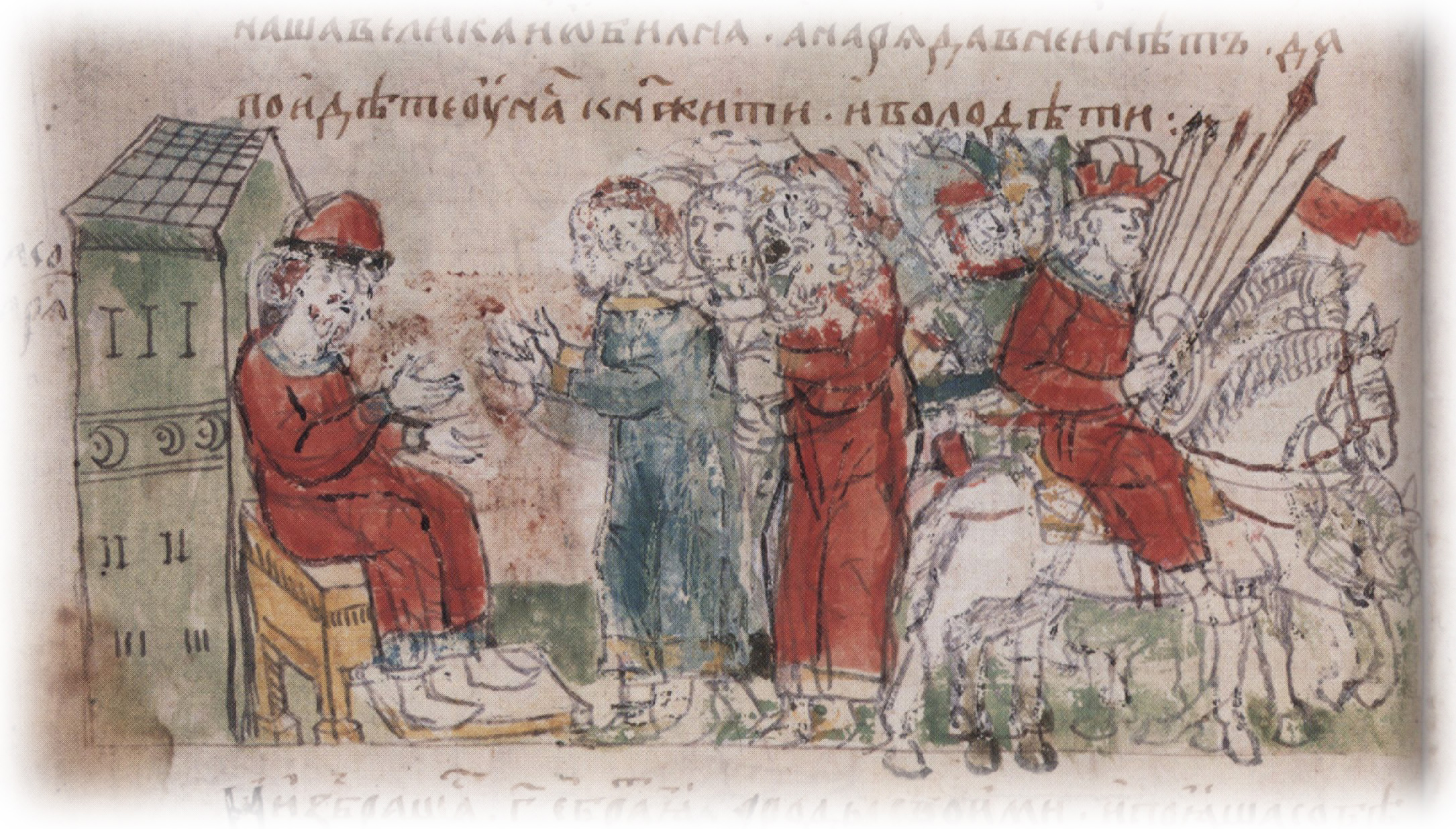
Calling of the Varangians miniature in the Radziwiłł Chronicle (15th century)

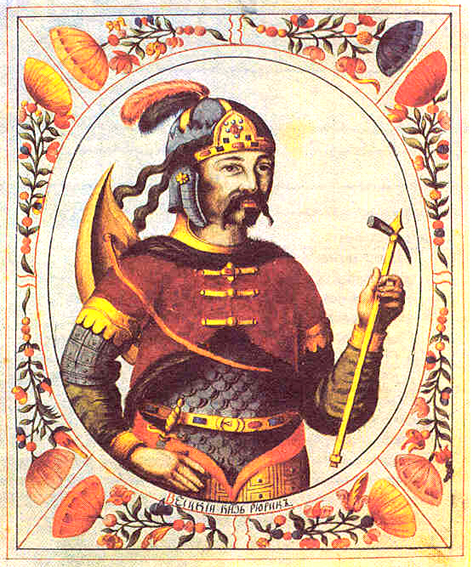
Image of Rurik in the Tsarsky titulyarnik (1672)

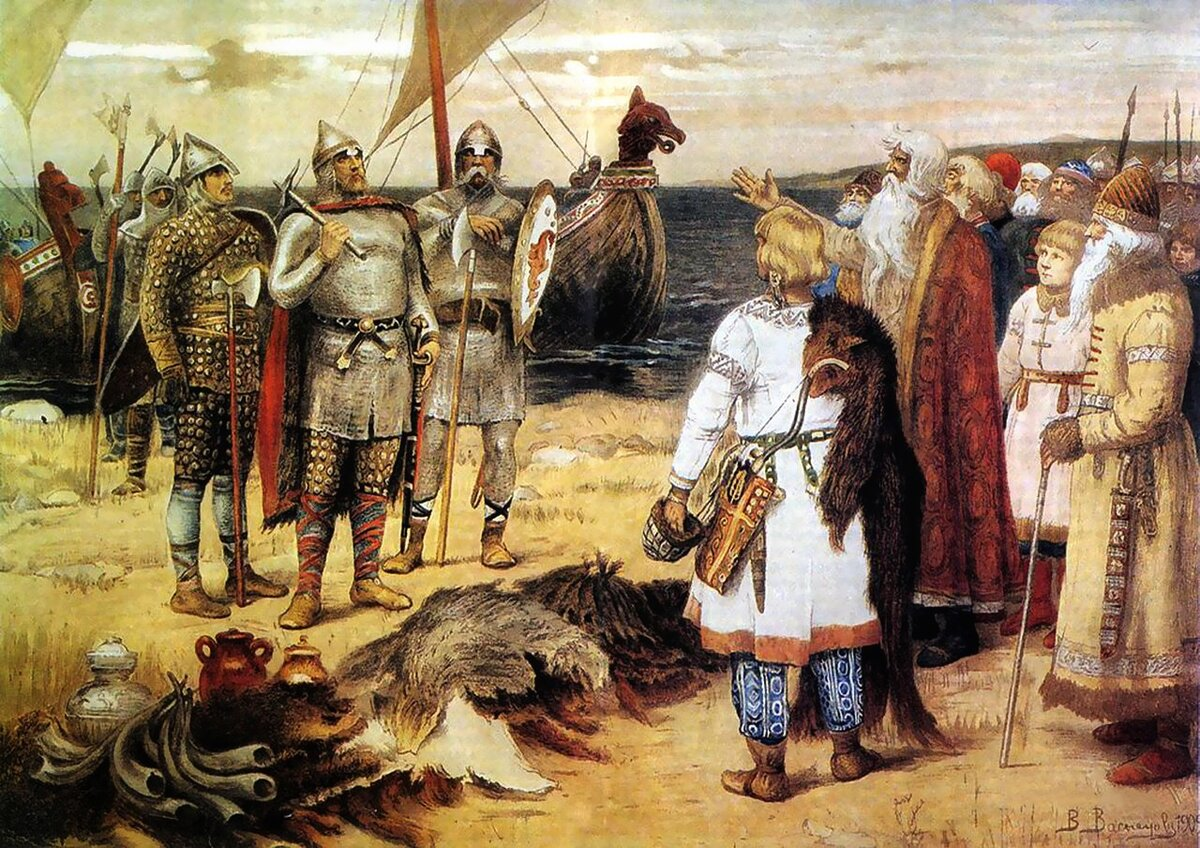
Rurik and his brothers Sineus and Truvor arrive at Ladoga. Painted by Viktor Vasnetsov (c. 1913)

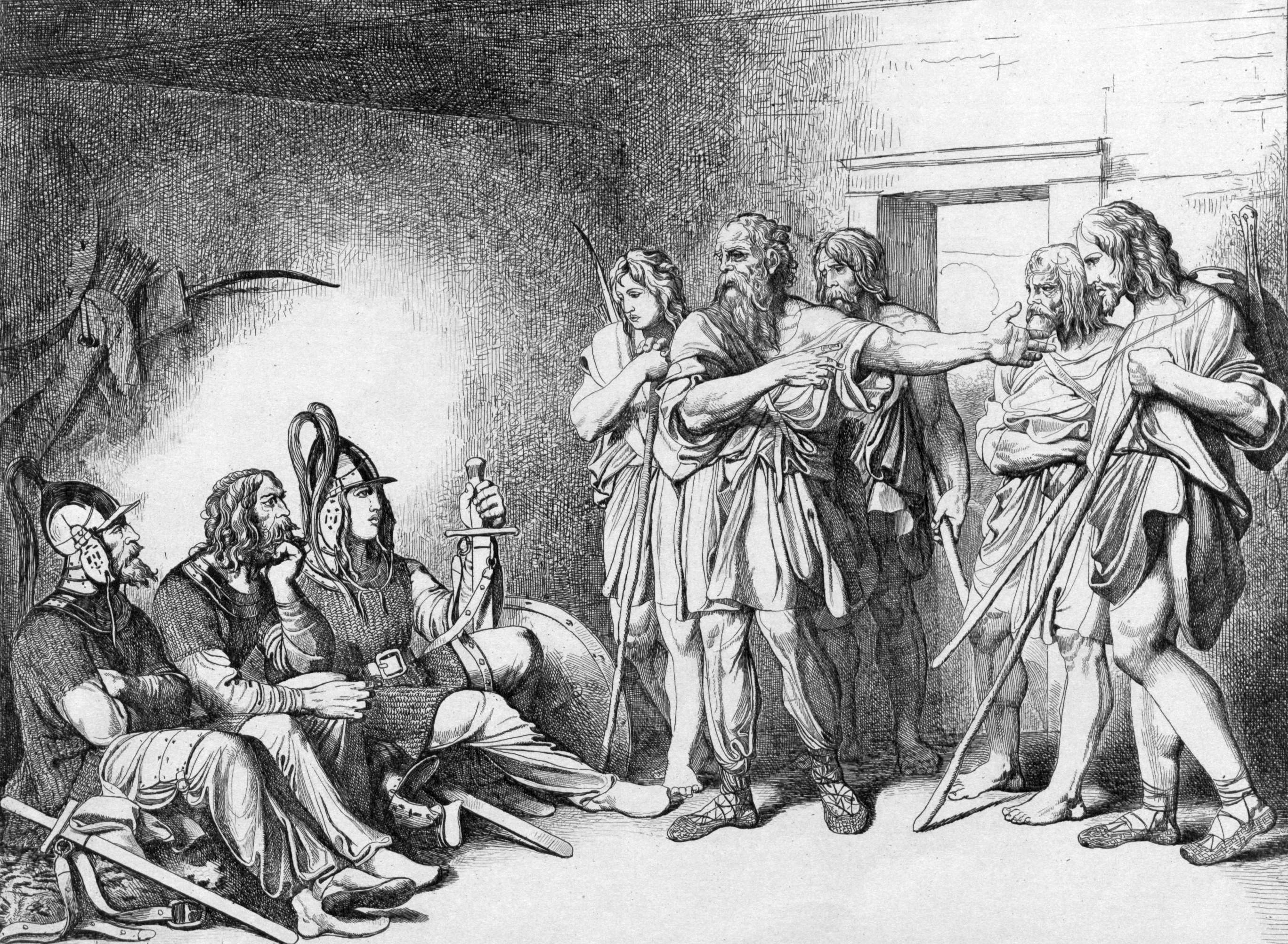
The Varangians Rurik, Sineus and Truvor are approached by messengers from the east. Drawn by Fyodor Bruni (c. 1839)

== Bibliography ==
- Duczko, Wladyslaw (1 January 2004). Viking Rus: Studies on the Presence of Scandinavians in Eastern Europe. BRILL. ISBN 978-90-04-13874-2.
- Ostrowski, Donald (2018). "Was There a Riurikid Dynasty in Early Rus'?". Canadian-American Slavic Studies. 52 (1): 30–49. doi:10.1163/22102396-05201009.

Rurik Rurikid Died: 879
Regnal titles
Title established	Prince of Novgorod; 862–879	Succeeded by Oleg the Wise
