= Izborsk =

Village in Russia

Izborsk Изборск
- Village
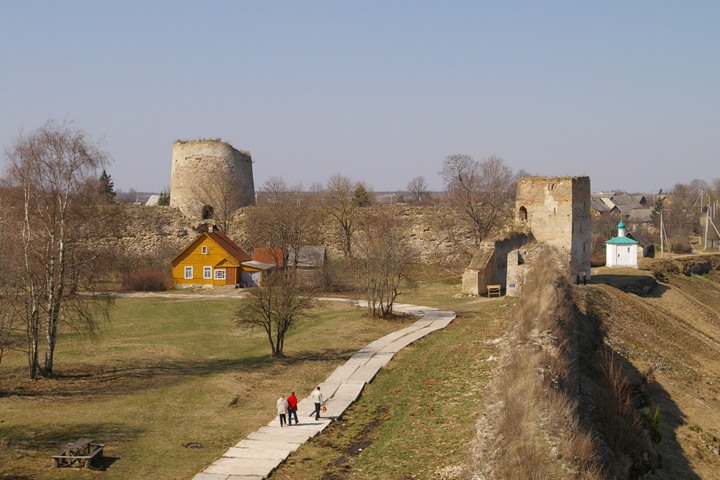
- Izborsk Fortress

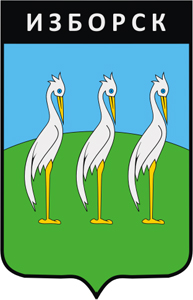
- Coat of arms

- Location within Pskov Oblast Location within Russia
- Coordinates: 57°42′37.10″N 27°51′33.40″E
- Country: Russia
- Region: Pskov Oblast
- District: Pechorsky District
- Time zone: UTC+3:00
- Postal code: 181518

Izborsk (Russian: Избо́рск; Estonian: Irboska; Seto: Irbosk, Irbuska) is a rural locality (village) in Pechorsky District of Pskov Oblast, Russia. It contains one of the most ancient and impressive fortresses of Western Russia. The village lies 30 kilometers (19 mi) to the west of Pskov and just to the east of the Russian-Estonian border.

== History ==
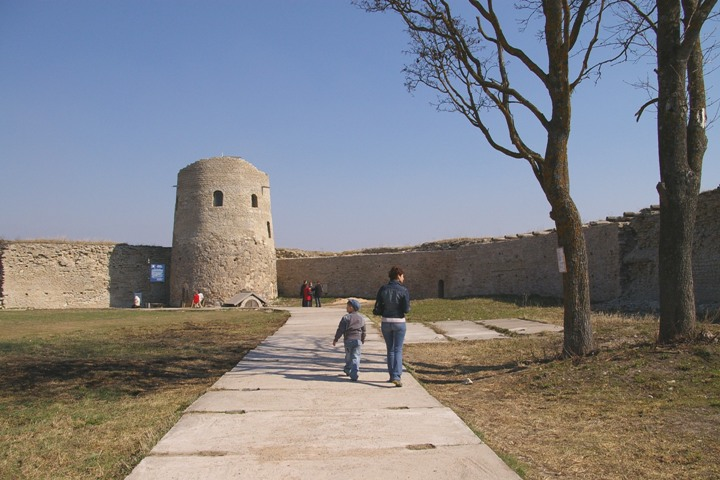
Inside the fortress of Izborsk

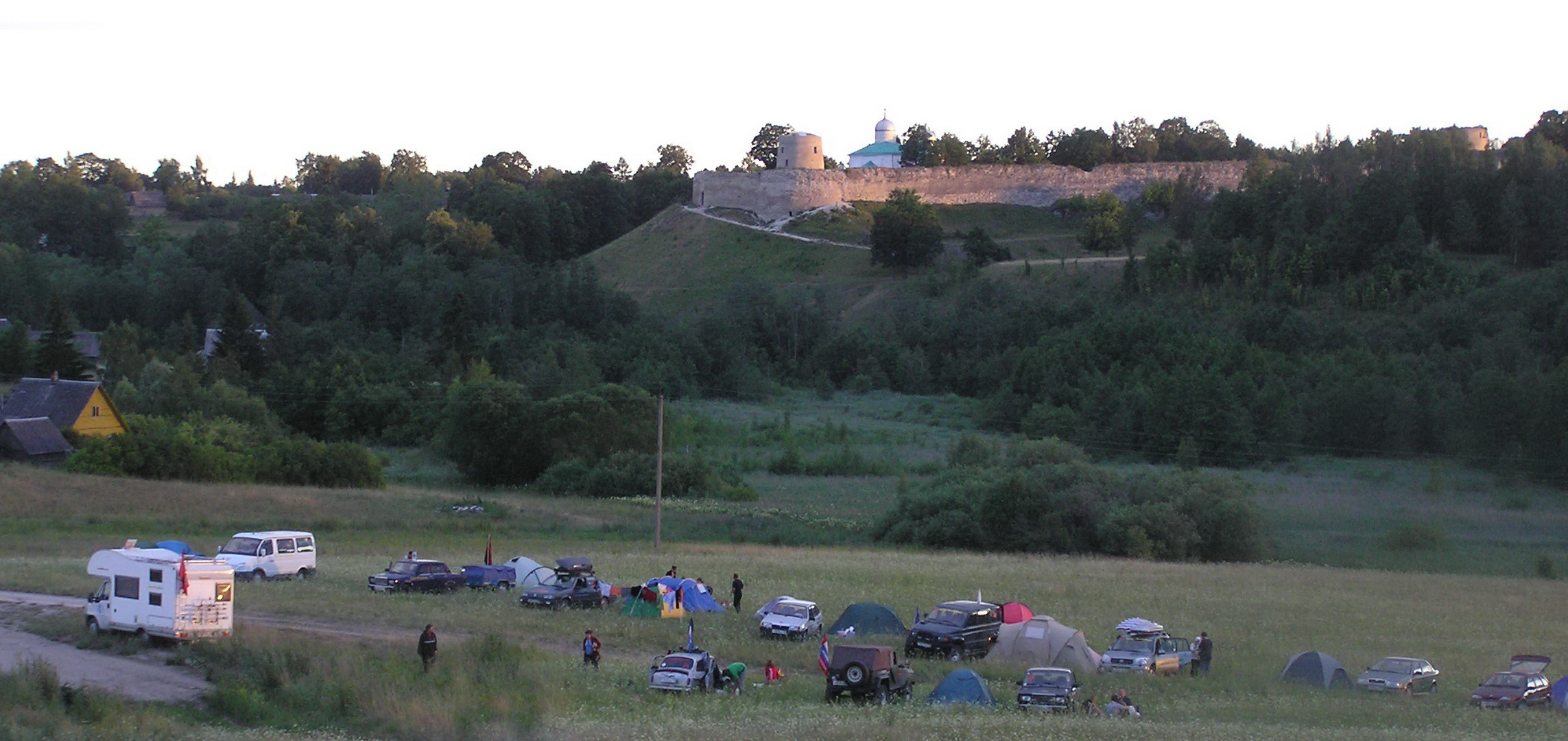
Evening at Izborsk fortress, 2004

The first fortified settlement was founded around the late 8th century.

According to the Russian Primary Chronicle, the town was the seat of Rurik's brother Truvor from 862 to 864. Russian historian Valentin Yanin (2008) agreed that the "existence of the "Rurik brothers" seems doubtful" based on a linguistic argument, adding: "... In Izborsk, it is customary to display a stone cross, supposedly standing on the grave of Truvor, in complete oblivion of the fact that Truvor, if he lived, then one and a half centuries before the establishment of Christianity in Eastern Europe. The most significant thing is that neither in Izborsk nor in Beloozero have archaeological excavations found any traces of Scandinavian presence in the 9th century." Although Truvor's burial mound is still shown to occasional tourists, archaeological excavations of long barrows abounding in the vicinity did not reveal the presence of the Varangian settlement at the site, which indicates that Izborsk was an important centre of the early Krivichs.

A stone fortress was built in the second half of the 11th century and Izborsk became the main settlement in the western frontier of the Novgorod Republic. In 1233, the fortress was captured by the Livonian Brothers of the Sword, along with their ally Yaroslav of Pskov, who attempted to regain control of the Pskov principality, but they were soon forced to withdraw. In 1240, Izborsk was captured by the Livonian Knights and it was freed two years later. It was burned down by the Livonians in 1269. In 1330, the posadnik of Pskov, Sheloga, constructed a new fortress on higher ground, at the top of Zheravya hill, which allowed it to withstand several sieges.

In 1348, the Pskov Republic, which included Izborsk, separated from the Novgorod Republic. In 1399, it became a viceroyalty of the Grand Principality of Moscow.

In the late 16th century, Izborsk was one of the smaller but strategically-important fortresses that protected the northwestern borders of Russia from invasion. The fortress was supposed to be impregnable and so the seizure of it in 1569 by a small Lithuanian regiment came as such a shock to Ivan the Terrible. The relative ease and the suspicious circumstances of the seizure of the fortress deeply troubled the already-paranoid Ivan. In the dead of night, Teterin, a Russian turncoat disguised as an oprichnik, ordered the gates of the town be opened in the name of the oprichnina, which allowed the enemy regiment to enter and overtake the fortress (the town of Izborsk, however, was never listed as territory in which oprichnina governance applied).

Though Ivan managed to retake the city with little difficulty, the treachery and the conspiracy involved in the original seizure led him to order the executions of the assistant crown secretaries of Izborsk, as well as the secretaries of the surrounding fortresses. With rumours of disaffection and growing discontent throughout the country on the rise, Ivan feared that other cities would soon follow the treasonous example of Izborsk. The proximity of the town to the cities of Novgorod and Pskov, coupled with the questionable implication of Novgorod's chancery administration in Teterin's plot, threw suspicion of treachery and defection onto the already-distrusted city.

During the Siege of Pskov (1581), Izborsk was captured by the Lithuanian troops, but after the Truce of Yam-Zapolsky (1582), it was handed over to Russia.

After the Great Northern War, Izborsk ceased to be a western borderline fortress of Russian. In 1708, it joined the newly-established Governorate of Saint-Petersburg (until 1710 called Ingermanland Governorate), where it was listed as the centre of uyezd in the Pskov Province. In 1727, all of Pskov Province was transferred to the Novgorod Governorate and was later transformed into a part of the larger Pskov Governorate, where Izborsk was listed as a town until 1920.

In 1920, according to the Treaty of Tartu, the Russian–Estonian state boundary went east of Izborsk and so the town became part of Estonia. From 1940 to 1945, the town remained within the occupied Republic of Estonia (1940), Estonian SSR (1940–1941), Nazi occupation) (1941–1944) and Estonian SSR (1944–1945).

In 1945, the Russian-Estonian border was redefined to resemble the pre-1918 borders between the Livonia and Pskov Governorate, leaving Izborsk with the Pskov Oblast of the Russian SFSR, now the Russian Federation.

== Fortress ==
Truvor's gorodishche is a settlement about half a kilometer north from the fortress that came about in the late 7th and early 8th century, and proceeded to grow twice in size in the 10th and 11th centuries. It was the predecessor of the Izborsk Fortress, protected by an oakwood wall which was later upgraded to stone, 3 meters in height by 3 meters in width in the 12th century.

To accommodate a larger capacity, the Izborsk Fortress was moved to its present location on the summit of Zheravya ("Crane") Hill in the year 1303, and the Lukovka Tower was built from stone on the outer edge, standing at 13 meters in height, and 9.5 meters in diameter.

First wooden fortress on the current site was built in early XIV century. The most ancient extant structure is the Tower Lukovka (literally, "Onion Tower"). At that time it was the only stone building west of Pskov and adjoined a wooden wall. The walls surrounding the fortress were modified from wood to stone soon after, in 1330. After seven other stone towers and the new stone wall were completed, Lukovka became a watch-tower and an armory. The Nativity church within the fortress was built in the 16th century.

The walls were yet again thickened in the 15th and 16th centuries, and the towers were now compatible with cannons. The side that was most prone to attack was designed thicker than the others, at 5 meters in width, while the rest range from 2.5 to 3.7 meters. The towers were built at a maximum of 60 meters apart for reinforcement.

There were two entrances to the fortress, both constructed with a barbican. The Nikolski gate, which is the larger of the two, has an inner gate with a tower and a portcullis, and is 90 meters long and 5 meters wide. The Talavski entrance is 36 meters long and 4 meters wide. The fortress' southeast side was equipped an underground stone hallway that provided access to a spring well.

Early XVIII century the fortress lost its borderline status and was abandoned. Due to the inclement weather and climate of the region, the fortress faced deterioration. First renovations of the deserted fortress were carried out in 1842 after the order approved by Nicolas I.

Recent restoration of the fortress, completed in 2012, was accompanied by gross embezzlement of money, and the fortress was severely damaged. On 15 March 2016, Grigory Pirumov, deputy minister of culture of Russia, and two other offices of the Ministry of Culture, were arrested on criminal charges related to the embezzlement. The repair and archaeological works are still in process.

Near the fortress there is a museum of stone crosses.

Though Truvor's gorodishche is mostly destroyed, a small part of the wall remains today.

In 2002, the Izborsk Fortress was nominated to be a part of Russia's World Heritage Tentative List.

== Cultural references ==
Izborsk is the namesake of the Eurasian think tank Izborsky Club, founded in 2012 by Alexander Prokhanov.

== Notable people ==
- Sergei Shtsherbakov (1871–1937), Estonian farmer and politician.
- Valentin Strukov, Estonian politician, was born in Izborsk.
