= Sineus and Truvor =

Brothers of Rurik, a Varangian chieftain of the Rus'

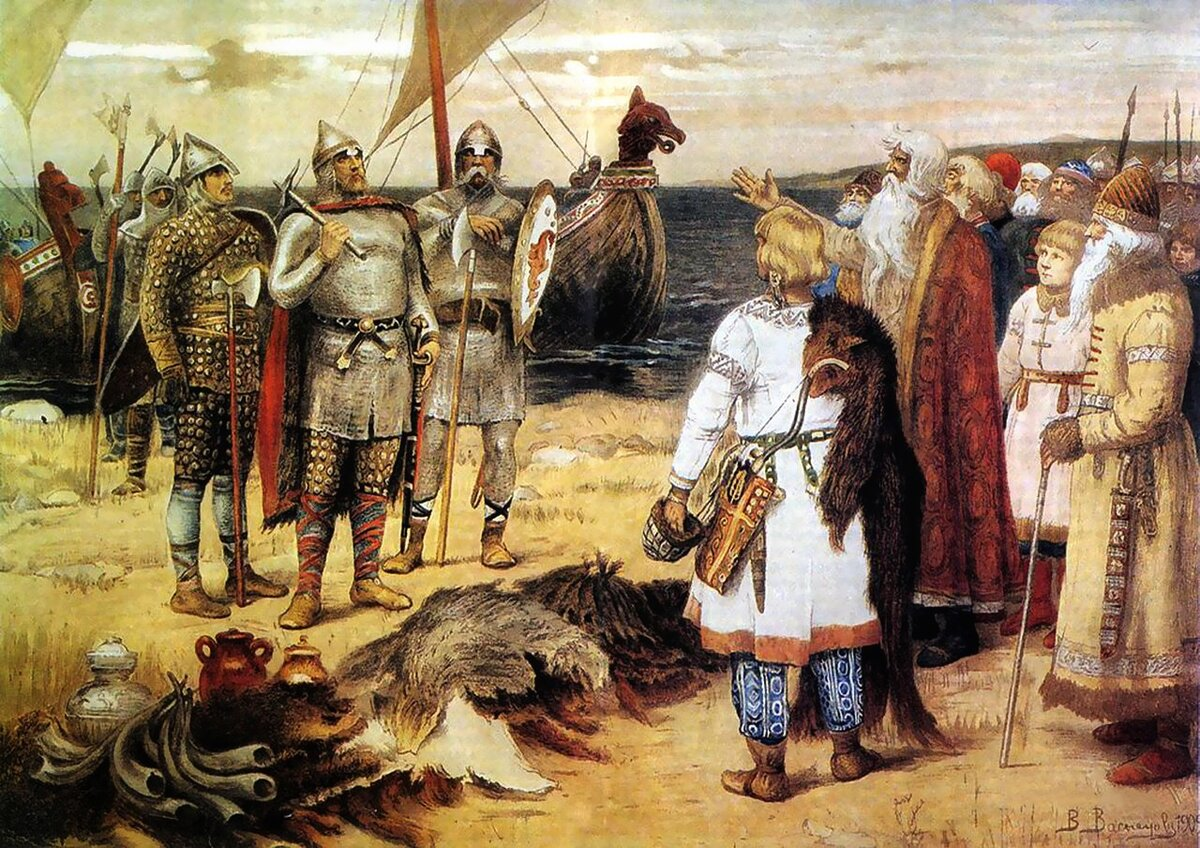
Brothers Rurik, Truvor and Sineus arrive at Ladoga, as painted by Viktor Vasnetsov (c. 1900).

Sineus and Truvor (Russian: Синеус и Трувор (Note: Church Slavonic: Синеусъ и Труворъ); Old Norse: Signjótr, Þórvar[ð]r) are mentioned in Rus' chronicles as brothers of Rurik, a Varangian chieftain of the Rus' who is traditionally considered to be the founder of the Rurikids. According to legendary calling of the Varangians as recorded in the Primary Chronicle (PVL) and Novgorod First Chronicle, the three brothers were invited by East Slavic and Finnic tribes to reign over them in what is now northwestern Russia in 862. Sineus established himself at Beloozero and Truvor at Izborsk. After they died, Rurik consolidated their territories into his own.

== Description ==
According to the Primary Chronicle, compiled in c. 1113, a group of Varangian Rus' were invited to rule over the local East Slavic and Finnic tribes after they began fighting each other. Rurik, the oldest of the brothers, established himself in Novgorod, while Sineus established himself at Beloozero, on the shores of Lake Beloye, and Truvor at Izborsk, although archaeological findings have also suggested that his residence was in Pskov. Truvor and Sineus died shortly after the establishment of their territories, and Rurik consolidated these lands into his own territory, thus laying the foundations for the state of Kievan Rus'.

== Interpretation ==
According to popular 20th-century scholarly interpretation (summarized in the textbook by Katsva and Yurganov), the phrase "Rurik, Sineus, en Truvor" should be read "Rurik, sine hus, en tro(gna) vär(ingar)" (Rurik, his house/relatives, and true companions). Melnikova (1998) disagreed, arguing that modern linguistical expertise shows that "sine hus" and "thru varing" contradict basic morphology and syntax of known old Scandinavian dialects, and could never be translated as "our faithful" and "his households". On the other hand, historians of the 19th century (A. Kunik, N. Belyaev, et al.) had already found common old Scandinavian names such as Signjótr (also Sveinn?) and Þórvar[ð]r, which could fit well with the PVL transcription of "Sineus" and "Truvor".

Russian historian Valentin Yanin (2008) agreed that the "existence of the "Rurik brothers" seems doubtful" based on the linguistic argument, adding: "The distance of Beloozero from Novgorod is quite significant, and the subordination of the territory closer in the direction of Beloozero to Novgorod occurred only in the middle of the 10th century, when Princess Olga established churchyards on the Msta. In Izborsk, it is customary to display a stone cross, supposedly standing on the grave of Truvor, in complete oblivion of the fact that Truvor, if he lived, then one and a half centuries before the establishment of Christianity in Eastern Europe. The most significant thing is that neither in Izborsk nor in Beloozero have archaeological excavations found any traces of Scandinavian presence in the 9th century."

== See also ==
- Rorik of Dorestad
