= Igor Danilevsky =

Russian historian (born 1953)

Igor Nikolaevich Danilevsky
- Игорь Николаевич Данилевский
- Born: Igor Nikolaevich Danilevsky; May 20, 1953 (age 72); Rostov-on-Don, Russia
- Occupation: Historian

Igor Nikolaevich Danilevsky (Russian: Игорь Николаевич Данилевский; born 20 May 1953) is a Russian historian and a specialist on the history of Kievan Rus' and Muscovy until the end of the 16th century.

== Biography ==
Igor Nikolaevich Danilevsky was born on 20 May 1953 in Rostov-on-Don. From 1970 to 1975, he studied at the Faculty of History of Rostov State University.

From 1978 to 1983, he was a lecturer at the Department of History of the USSR of the Faculty of History of Rostov State Pedagogical Institute. In 1981, at the Faculty of History of Lomonosov Moscow State University Danilevsky defended his thesis on the topic "Temporary data of written sources and methods of dating of historical facts".

From 1983 to 1988, he was inspector-methodologist and deputy head of the Department of Public Disciplines Teaching of the Ministry of Education of the RSFSR. From 1988 to 1989, he was the Director of the Republican Educational and Methodical Cabinet of Higher and Secondary Pedagogical Education of the Ministry of Education of the RSFSR.

From 1988 to 1994, he was an associate professor of the Department of History of the USSR at Moscow State Pedagogical Institute. From 1994 to 1996, Danilevsky was the Head of laboratory of personality formation at Russian Academy of Education. In 1996—2001 he was an associate professor and Head of the Laboratory of the Department of Source Studies and Supporting Historical Disciplines of the Historical Archival Institute of the RSUH.

From 2001 to 2010, he was the deputy director for research and head of the Department of Social and Cultural Studies of Russian Academy of Sciences. Since 2010, he has been head of the Department of History of Ideas and Methodology of Historical Science of the Faculty of History of Higher School of Economics.

Igor Nikolaevich Danilevsky is the author of more than 150 works.

== Main works ==
- Данилевский И. Н., Пронштейн А. П. Вопросы теории и методики исторического исследования. — М., 1986.
- Данилевский И. Н. Древняя Русь глазами современников и потомков (IX—XII вв.): курс лекций. — М.: Аспект-Пресс, 1998 ISBN 5-7567-0219-9 (2-е изд. 2001)
- Данилевский И. Н. Русские земли глазами современников и потомков (XII—XIV вв.): курс лекций. — М., 2001.
- Данилевский И. Н. Повесть временных лет: герменевтические основы изучения летописных текстов. — М., 2004.
