= Kryvichy =

Kryvichy (Belarusian: Крывічы; Russian: Кривичи, romanized: Krivichi) may refer to the following places in Belarus:

- Kryvichy, Brest Region, a village in Pinsk District, Brest Region
- Kryvichy, Iwye District, a village in Iwye District, Grodno Region
- Kryvichy, Lida District, a village in Lida District, Grodno Region
- Kryvichy, Myadzyel District, an urban-type settlement in Myadzyel District, Minsk Region
- Kryvichy, Salihorsk District, an agrotown in Salihorsk District, Minsk Region
- Kryvichy, Vitebsk Region, a village in Hlybokaye District, Vitebsk Region
- Kryvichy, Zelva District, an agrotown in Zelva District, Grodno Region

== See also ==
- Krivichi (disambiguation)
