= Krivichs =

6th-12th century East Slavic tribal confederation

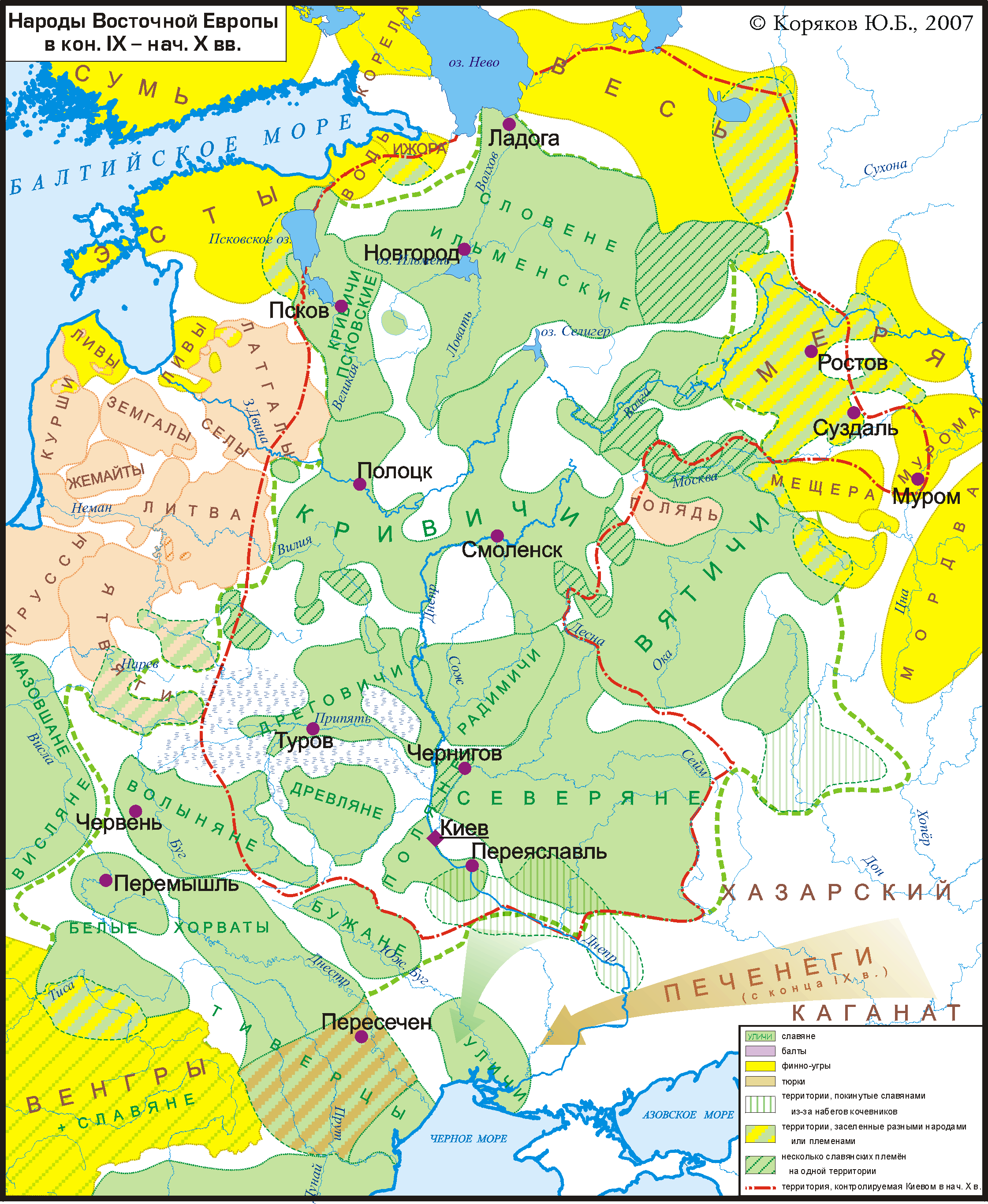
A tentative map of the peoples of the Eastern Europe in the 9-10th centuries. Krivichs are marked right in the center.

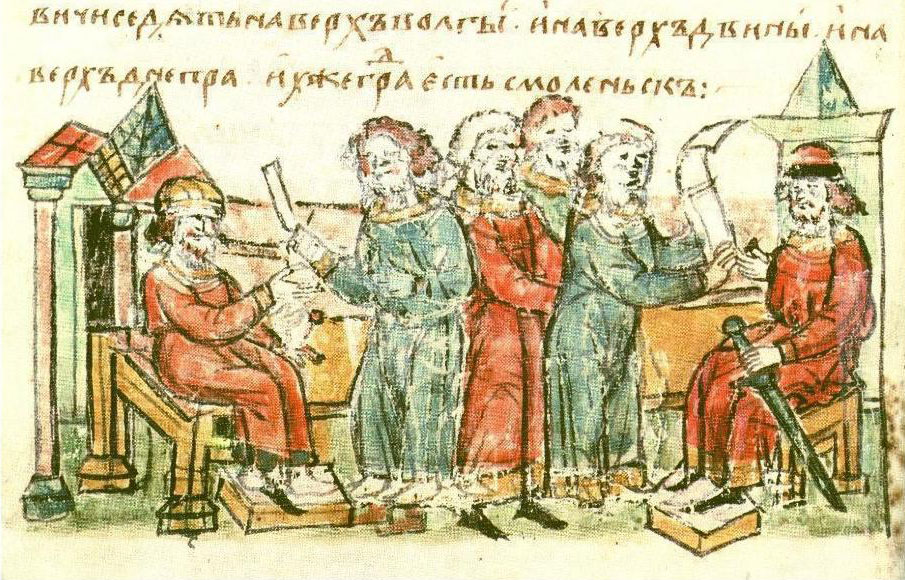
A miniature from Radzivill Chronicle showing ancient tribe of Krivichs

The Krivichs, or Kryvichs (Belarusian: Крывічы, romanized: Kryvičy, IPA: [krɨvʲiˈt͡ʂɨ]; Russian: Кривичи, romanized: Krivichi, IPA: [ˈkrʲivʲɪtɕɪ]), were a tribal union of Early East Slavs between the 6th and the 12th centuries. It is suggested that originally the Krivichi were native to the area around Pskov. They migrated to the mostly Finnic areas in the upper reaches of the Volga, Dnieper, Dvina, areas south of the lower reaches of river Velikaya and parts of the Neman basin.

== Etymology ==
According to Max Vasmer, the name of the tribe probably stems from that of their legendary forefather Kriv. The article in the encyclopedia Мифы народов мира clarifies that this interpretation comes from East Slavic mythology. Vasmer also mentions that the tribe was mentioned by Constantine VII Porphyrogenitus in his De Administrando Imperio as Κριβιτζοί, Κριβιτσηνοί.

== History ==
The Krivichs left many archaeological monuments, such as the remnants of agricultural settlements with traces of ironworks, jeweler's art, blacksmith's work and other handicrafts; long burial mounds of the 6th to 9th centuries with cremated bodies; burial mounds of rich warriors with weapons; sets of distinctive jewelry (bracelet-like temporal rings and glass beads made out of stretched wire). By the end of the first millennium, the Krivichs had already acquired well-developed farming and cattle-breeding. Having settled around the Trade route from the Varangians to the Greeks, the Krivichs traded with the Varangians. Their chief tribal centres were Gnezdovo, Izborsk, and Polotsk.

The Krivichs as a tribe took part in Oleg's and Igor's military campaigns against the Byzantine Empire.

== Modern uses of the name ==
- Today, in Latvian, Krievs means "Russian" and Krievija is "Russia". Through Baltic territories, the word became known in Central Europe. For example, a German chronicler from Duisburg wrote in 1314: "Frater Henricus Marschalcus... venit ad terram Crivitae, et civitatem illam, quae parva Nogardia dicitur cepit". And in a Polish publication Kazanie na Pogrzeb Maryanny Korsakywnej (Lublin, 1687. Б. II, 49) the Polotsk saint Paraxedis was called Regina Krivitae (the queen of the Kryvians).
- Also in Latvian, a Belarusian is known as Baltkrievs, and Belarus is named Baltkrievija. The prefix balt- is from the Latvian word balts which means "white", thus Baltkrievija is cognate to "White Russia" and "Belarus" itself.
- Kryvich (Крывіч) was the name of a magazine that the Belarusian historian Vaclau Lastouski published in Kaunas from 1923 to 1927.
- Kriwi is the name of a Belarusian folk-rock band.
- Places named Kryvičy in modern Belarus are possibly named after the tribe, however this is contested basing on the suggested areal of Krivichs.

== See also ==
- List of Medieval Slavic tribes
- Bibliography of Russian history
