= Rus' people =

European ethnic group

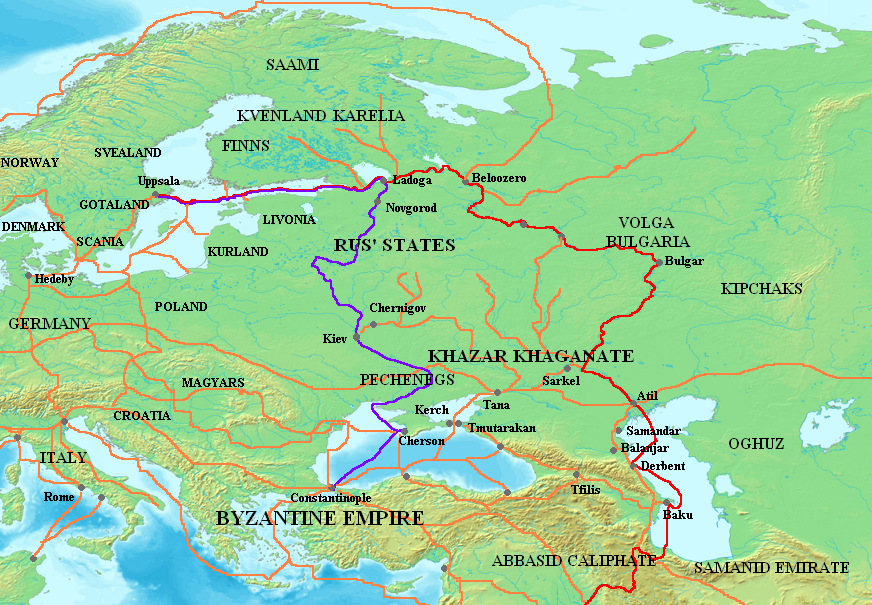
Map showing the major Varangian trade routes: the Volga trade route (in red) and the trade route from the Varangians to the Greeks (in purple). Sufficiently controlling strongholds, market places and portages along the routes was necessary for the Scandinavian raiders and traders.

The Rus', (Note: Also commonly spelled Rus without the apostrophe; Old East Slavic: Роусь; Belarusian, Russian, Rusyn, and Ukrainian: Русь; Greek: Ῥῶς, romanised: Rhos) also known as Russes, were a people in early medieval Eastern Europe. The scholarly consensus holds that they were originally Norsemen, mainly originating from present-day Sweden, who settled and ruled along the river-routes between the Baltic and the Black Sea from around the 8th to 11th centuries AD.

The two original centres of the Rus' were Ladoga (Aldeigja), founded in the mid-8th century, and Rurikovo Gorodische (Holmr), founded in the mid-9th century. The two settlements were situated at opposite ends of the Volkhov River, between Lake Ilmen and Lake Ladoga, and the Norsemen likely called this territory Gardar. From there, the name of the Rus' was transferred to the Middle Dnieper, and the Rus' then moved eastward to where the Finnic tribes lived and southward to where the Slavs lived.

The name Garðaríki was applied to the newly formed state of Kievan Rus', and the ruling Norsemen along with local Finnic tribes gradually assimilated into the East Slavic population and came to speak a common language. Old Norse remained familiar to the elite until their complete assimilation by the second half of the 11th century, and in rural areas, vestiges of Norse culture persisted as late as the 14th and early 15th centuries, particularly in the north.

The history of the Rus' is central to 9th through 10th-century state formation, and thus national origins, in Eastern Europe. They ultimately gave their name to Russia and Belarus, and they are relevant to the national histories of Russia, Ukraine and Belarus. Due to this importance, there is a set of alternative so-called "anti-Normanist" views that are largely confined to a minor group of Eastern European scholars.

== Etymology ==
The approximate extent of Old Norse and related languages in the early 10th century: Old West Norse dialect Old East Norse dialect Old Gutnish dialect Old English Crimean Gothic Other Germanic languages with which Old Norse still retained some mutual intelligibility

Note: The þ (thorn letter) represents the voiceless dental fricative /θ/ of th in English thing, whereas the ð (eth letter) represents the voiced dental fricative /ð/ of th in English the. When þ appears in intervocalic position or before a voiced consonant, it is pronounced like ð, so the pronunciation difference between rōþer and róðr is minute.

Europe in the 9th century. Roslagen is located along the coast of the northern tip of the area marked "Swedes and Goths".

The name Rusʹ remains not only in names such as Russia and Belarus, but it is also preserved in many place names in the Novgorod and Pskov districts, and it is the origin of the Greek Rōs. Rus' is generally considered to be a borrowing from Finnic Ruotsi ("Sweden"). There are two theories behind the origin of Rus'/Ruotsi, which are not mutually exclusive. It is either derived more directly from OEN rōþer (OWN róðr), which referred to rowing, the fleet levy, etc., or it is derived from this term through Rōþin, an older name for the Swedish coastal region Roslagen. Since Ruotsi and its cognates are found in all Finnic languages, the term is assumed to have entered the Finnic lexicon before the languages diverged, before or at the beginning of the Viking Age.

The Finnish and Russian forms of the name have a final -s revealing an original compound where the first element was rōþ(r)s- (preceding a voiceless consonant, þ is pronounced like th in English thing). The prefix form rōþs- is found not only in Ruotsi and Rusʹ, but also in Old Norse róþsmenn and róþskarlar, both meaning "rowers", and in the modern Swedish name for the people of Roslagen – rospiggar which derives from ON *rōþsbyggiar ("inhabitants of Rōþin"). The name Roslagen itself is formed with this element and the plural definite form of the neuter noun lag, meaning "the teams", in reference to the teams of rowers in the Swedish kings' fleet levy.

There are at least two, probably three, instances of the root in Old Norse from two 11th-century runic inscriptions, fittingly located at two extremes of the trade route from the Varangians to the Greeks. Two of them are roþ for rōþer /róðr, meaning "fleet levy", on the Håkan stone, and as i ruþi (translated as "dominion") on the lost Nibble stone, in the old Swedish heartland in the Mälaren Valley, and the possible third one was identified by Erik Brate in the most widely accepted reading as roþ(r)slanti on the Piraeus Lion originally located in Athens, where a runic inscription was most likely carved by Swedish mercenaries serving in the Varangian Guard. Brate has reconstructed *Rōþsland, as an old name for Roslagen.

Between the two compatible theories represented by róðr or Róðinn, modern scholarship leans towards the former because at the time, the region covered by the latter term, Roslagen, remained sparsely populated and lacked the demographic strength necessary to stand out compared to the adjacent Swedish heartland of the Mälaren Valley. Consequently, an origin in word compounds such as róþs-menn and róþs-karlar is considered the most likely one. Moreover, the form róþs-, from which Ruotsi and Rusʹ originate, is not derived directly from ON róðr, but from its earlier Proto-Norse form roðz (rothz).

Other theories such as derivation from Rusa, a name for the Volga, are rejected or ignored by mainstream scholarship.

== History ==
Having settled Ladoga in the 750s, Scandinavian colonists played an important role in the early ethnogenesis of the Rus' people, and in the formation of the Rus' Khaganate. Ladoga, then known as Aldeigja by the Norsemen, was the earliest and most significant settlement of the Rus', while Gorodische, likely known as Holmr, was founded over a century later. It was from the Ladoga area, which formed the centre of the Rus', that the envoys went to Constantinople in 838. The Varangians are first mentioned in the Primary Chronicle as having exacted tribute from the Slavic and Finnic tribes in 859. It was the time of rapid expansion of the Vikings' presence in Northern Europe; England began to pay Danegeld in 865, and the Curonians faced an invasion by the Swedes around the same time.

The Varangians are mentioned in the Primary Chronicle, which suggests that the term Rus' was used to denote Scandinavians until it became firmly associated with the now extensively Slavicised elite of Kievan Rus'. At that point, the new term Varangian was increasingly preferred to name the Scandinavians, probably mostly from what is currently Sweden, plying the river routes between the Baltic and the Black and Caspian Seas. Relatively few of the rune stones Varangians left in their native Sweden tell of their journeys abroad, to such places as what is today Russia, Ukraine, Belarus, Greece, and Italy. Most of these rune stones can be seen today, and are a significant piece of historical evidence. The Varangian runestones tell of many notable Varangian expeditions, and even recount the fates of individual warriors and travelers.

In Russian historiography, two cities are used to describe the beginnings of the country: Kiev and Novgorod. In the first part of the 11th century the former was already a Slav metropolis, rich and powerful, a fast growing centre of civilisation adopted from Byzantium. The latter town, Novgorod, was another centre of the same culture but founded in different surroundings, where some old local traditions moulded this commercial city into the capital of a powerful oligarchic trading republic of a kind otherwise unknown in this part of Europe. These towns have tended to overshadow the significance of other places that had existed long before Kiev and Novgorod were founded. The two original centres of Rus' were Staraya Ladoga and Rurikovo Gorodische, two points on the Volkhov, a river running for 200 kilometres (120 mi) between Lake Ilmen in the south to Lake Ladoga in the north. This was the territory that most probably was originally called by the Norsemen Gardar, a name that long after the Viking Age acquired a much broader meaning and became Garðaríki, a denomination for the entire state. The area between the lakes was the original Rus', and it was from here that its name was transferred to the territories inhabited by the Slavs on the middle Dnieper, which eventually became the "land of Rus" (Ruskaja zemlja). The Primary Chronicle portrays the East Slavic tribe of Polans as the most civilised of the East Slavs, and that they were therefore predisposed to host the Rus', but not give their name to the land. From this area, the Rus' moved eastward to the lands inhabited by Finno-Ugric tribes in the Volga-Oka region, as well as south along the Dnieper.

The prehistory of the first territory of Rus' has been sought in the developments around the early-8th century, when Staraja Ladoga was founded as a manufacturing centre and to conduct trade, serving the operations of Scandinavian hunters and dealers in furs obtained in the north-eastern forest zone of Eastern Europe. In the early period (the second part of the 8th and first part of the 9th century), a Norse presence is only visible at Staraya Ladoga, and to a much lesser degree at a few other sites in the northern parts of Eastern Europe. The objects that represent Norse material culture of this period are rare outside Ladoga and mostly known as single finds. This rarity continues throughout the 9th century until the whole situation changes radically during the next century, when historians meet, at many places and in relatively large quantities, the material remains of a thriving Scandinavian culture. For a short period of time, some areas of Eastern Europe became as much part of the Norse world as were Danish and Norwegian territories in the West. The culture of the Rus' contained Norse elements used as a manifestation of their Scandinavian background. These elements, which were current in 10th-century Scandinavia, appear at various places in the form of collections of many types of metal ornaments, mainly female but male also, such as weapons, decorated parts of horse bridles, and diverse objects embellished in contemporaneous Norse art styles.

The Swedish king Anund Jakob wanted to assist Yaroslav the Wise, Grand prince of Kiev, in his campaigns against the Pechenegs. The so-called Ingvar the Far-Travelled, a Swedish Viking who wanted to conquer Georgia, also assisted Yaroslav with 3000 men in the war against the Pechenegs; however, he later continued on to Georgia. Yaroslav the Wise married the Swedish king's daughter, Ingegerd Olofsdotter of Sweden, who became the Russian saint, Anna, while Harald Hardrada, the Norwegian king who was a military commander of the Varangian guard, married Elisiv of Kiev. The two first uncontroversially historical Swedish kings Eric the Victorious and Olof Skötkonung both had Slavic wives. Danish kings and royals also frequently had Slavic wives. For example, Harald Bluetooth married Tove of the Obotrites. Vikings also made up the bulk of the bodyguards of early Kievan Rus' rulers.

Evidence for strong bloodline connections between the Kievan Rus' and Scandinavia existed and a strong alliance between Vikings and early Kievan rulers is indicated in early texts of Scandinavian and East Slavic history. Several thousand Swedish Vikings died for the defence of Kievan Rus' against the Pechenegs.

=== Scandinavian sources ===
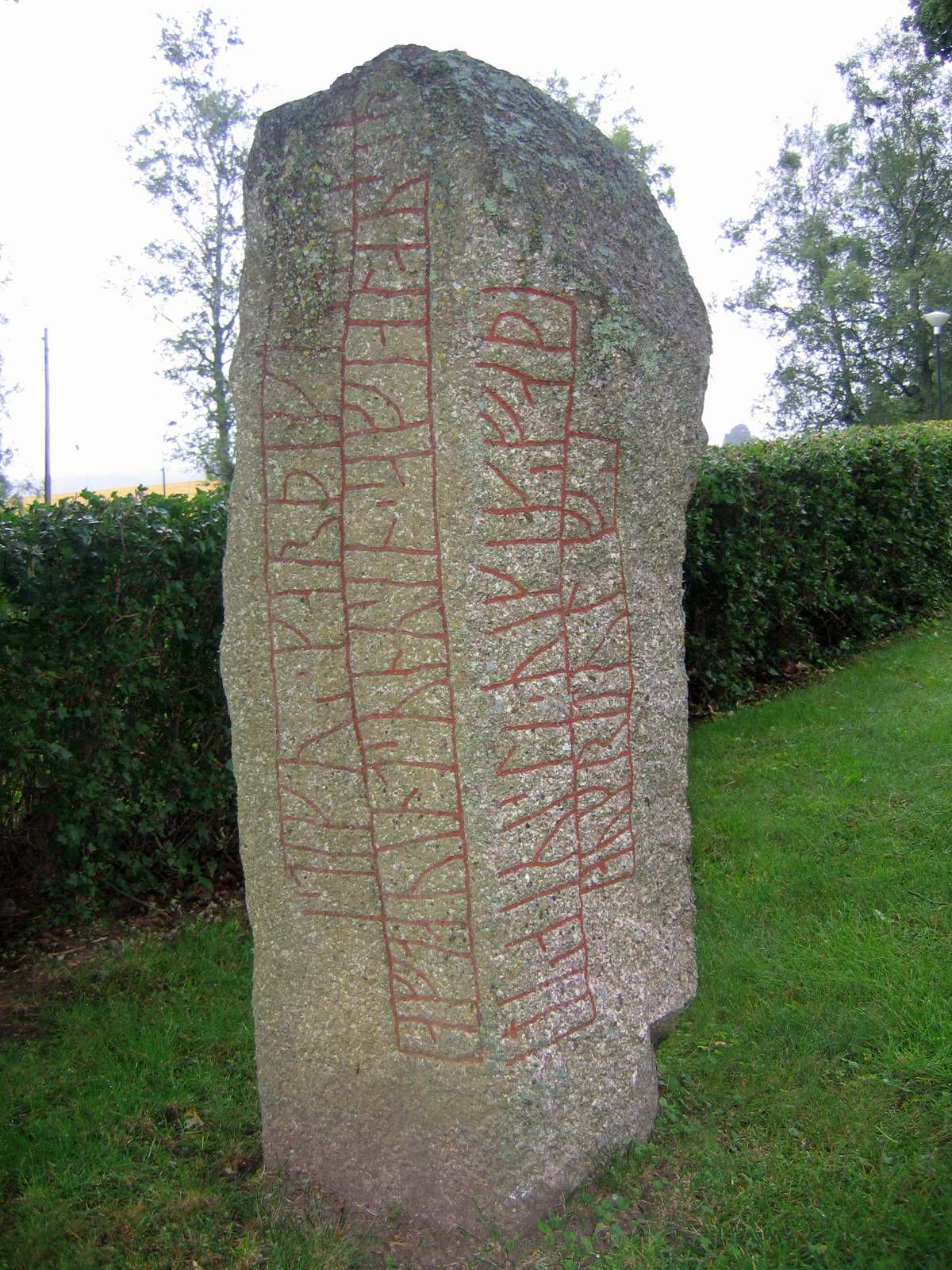
The Kälvesten runestone from the 9th century.

In Scandinavian sources, the area is called Austr (the "East"), Garðaríki (the "realm of cities"), or simply Garðar (the "cities"), and Svíþjóð hin mikla ("Great Sweden"). The last name appears in the 12th century geographical work Leiðarvísir ok Borgaskipan by the Icelandic abbot Nicolaus (d. 1161) and in Ynglinga saga by Snorri Sturluson, which indicates that the Icelanders considered Kievan Rus' to have been founded by the Swedes. The name "Great Sweden" is introduced as a non-Icelandic name with the phrase "which we call Garðaríki" (sú er vér köllum Garðaríki), and it is possible that it is a folk etymological interpretation of Scythia magna. However, if this is the case, it can still be influenced by the tradition that Kievan Rus' was of Swedish origin, which recalls Magna Graecia as a name for the Greek colonies in Italy.

When the Norse sagas were put to text in the 13th century, the Norse colonisation of Eastern Europe, however, was a distant past, and little of historical value can be extracted. The oldest traditions were recorded in the Legendary sagas and there Garðaríki appears as a Norse kingdom where the rulers have Norse names, but where also dwelt the Dwarves Dvalin and Durin. There is, however, more reliable information from the 11th and the 12th centuries, but at that time most of the Scandinavian population had already assimilated, and the term Rus' referred to a largely Slavic-speaking population. Still, Eastern Europe is presented as the traditional Swedish sphere of interest. The sagas preserve Old Norse names of several important Rus' settlements, including Hólmgarðr (Novgorod), and Kønugarðr (Kiev); Fjodor Uspenskij argues that the use of the element garðr in these names, as well as in the names Garðar and Miklagarðr (Constantinople), shows the influence of Old East Slavic gorodǔ (city), as garðr usually means farmstead in Old Norse. He further argues that the city names can be used to show that the Rus' were also competent in Old East Slavic. At this time the Rus' borrowed some 15 Old East Slavic words, such as the word for marketplace, tǔrgǔ, as torg, many of which spread to the other Old Norse-speaking regions as well.

The most contemporary sources are the Varangian runestones, but just like the sagas, the vast majority of them arrive relatively late. The earliest runestone that tells of eastwards voyages is the Kälvesten runestone from the 9th century in Östergötland, but it does not specify where the expedition had gone. It was Harald Bluetooth's construction of the Jelling stones in the late 10th century that started the runestone fashion that resulted in the raising of thousands of runestones in Sweden during the 11th century; at that time the Swedes arrived as mercenaries and traders rather than settlers. In the 8th, 9th and 10th centuries runic memorials had consisted of runes on wooden poles that were erected in the ground, something which explains the lack of runic inscriptions from this period both in Scandinavia and in eastern Europe as wood is perishable. This tradition was described by Ibn Fadlan who met Scandinavians on the shores of the Volga.

The Fagerlöt runestone gives a hint of the Old Norse spoken in Kievan Rus', as folksgrimʀ may have been the title that the commander had in the retinue of Yaroslav I the Wise in Novgorod. The suffix -grimmr is a virtually unique word for "leader" which is otherwise only attested in the Swedish medieval poem Stolt Herr Alf, but in the later form grim. It is not attested as a noun in the sense "leader" in West Norse sources. In Old Norse, the basic meaning of the adjective grimmr is "heartless, strict and wicked", and so grimmr is comparable in semantics to Old Norse gramr which meant both "wrath", "king" and "warrior".

Other runestones explicitly mentioning warriors serving the ruler of Kievan Rus' are one of the Skåäng runestones, the Smula runestone and most famously, the Turinge runestone which immortalises the dead commander with a poem:

Brøðr vaʀu þæiʀ bæstra manna, a landi ok i liði uti, heldu sina huskarla ve[l]. Hann fioll i orrustu austr i Garðum, liðs forungi, landmanna bæstr.	These brothers were the best of men in the land and abroad in the retinue, held their housecarls well. He fell in battle in the east in Garðar (Russia), commander of the retinue, the best of landholders.

The Veda runestone is of note as it indicates that the riches that were acquired in Eastern Europe had led to the new procedure of legally buying clan land, and the Swedish chieftain Jarlabanke used his clan's acquired wealth to erect the monument Jarlabanke Runestones after himself while alive and where he bragged that he owned the whole hundred.

=== Slavic sources ===
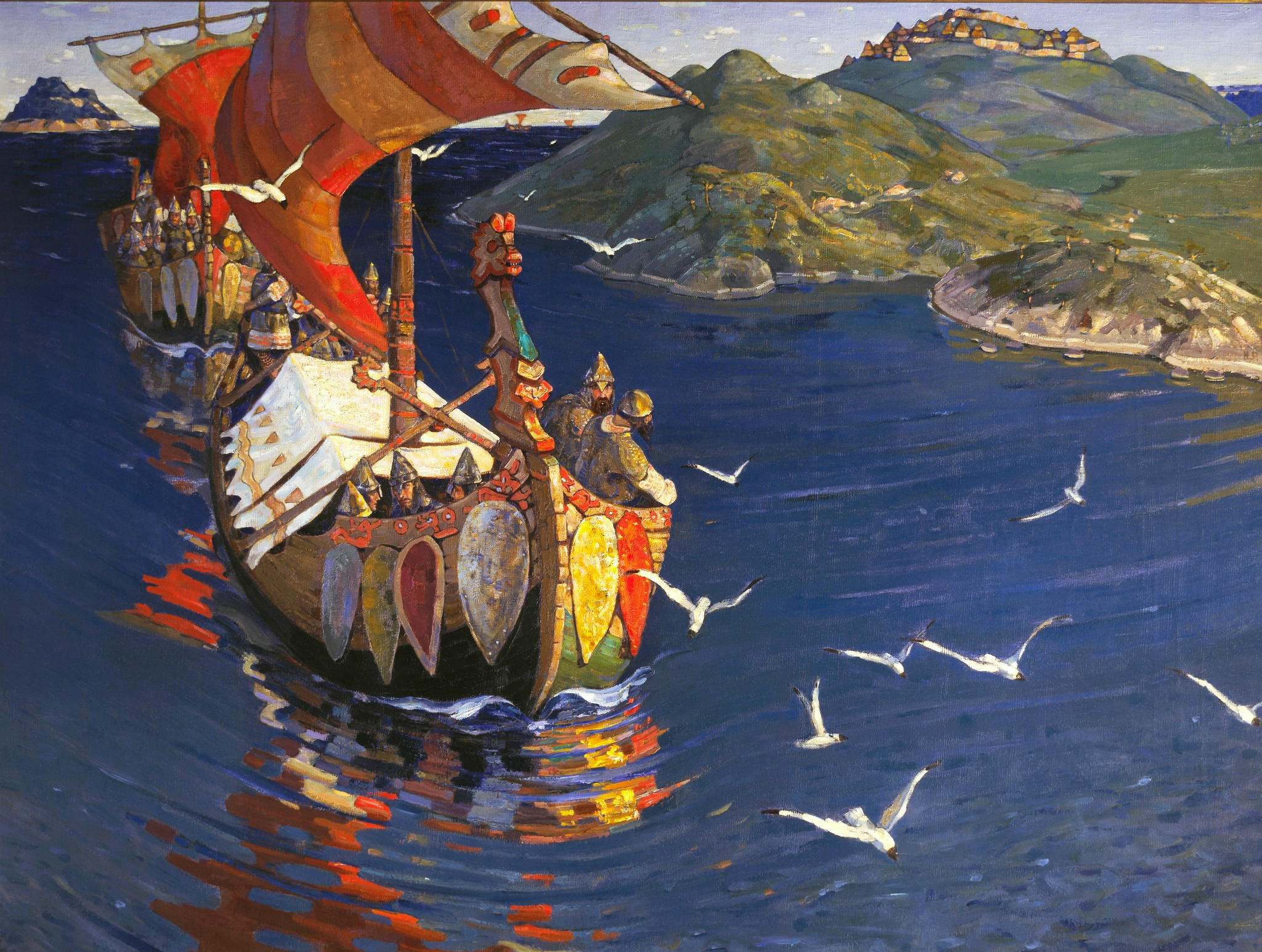
Guests from Overseas, Nicholas Roerich (1899)

The earliest Slavonic-language narrative account of Rus' history is the Primary Chronicle, compiled and adapted from a wide range of sources in Kiev at the start of the 13th century. It has therefore been influential in modern history-writing, but it was also compiled much later than the time it describes, and historians agree it primarily reflects the political and religious politics of the time of Mstislav I of Kiev.

However, the chronicle does include the texts of a series of Rus'–Byzantine Treaties from 911, 945, and 971. The Rus'–Byzantine Treaties give a valuable insight into the names of the Rus'. Of the fourteen Rus' signatories to the Rus'–Byzantine Treaty in 907, all had Norse names. By the Rusʹ–Byzantine Treaty (945) in 945, some signatories of the Rus' had Slavic names while the vast majority had Norse names.

The Chronicle presents the following origin myth for the arrival of Rus' in the region of Novgorod: the Rus'/Varangians 'imposed tribute upon the Chuds, the Slavs, the Merians, the Ves', and the Krivichians' (a variety of Slavic and Finnic peoples).

The tributaries of the Varangians drove them back beyond the sea and, refusing them further tribute, set out to govern themselves. There was no law among them, but tribe rose against tribe. Discord thus ensued among them, and they began to war one against the other. They said to themselves, "Let us seek a prince who may rule over us, and judge us according to the Law". They accordingly went overseas to the Varangian Russes: these particular Varangians were known as Russes, just as some are called Swedes, and others Normans, English, and Gotlanders, for they were thus named. The Chuds, the Slavs, the Krivichians and the Ves' then said to the people of Rus', "Our land is great and rich, but there is no order in it. Come to rule and reign over us". Thus they selected three brothers, with their kinsfolk, who took with them all the Russes and migrated. The oldest, Rurik, located himself in Novgorod; the second, Sineus, at Beloozero; and the third, Truvor, in Izborsk. On account of these Varangians, the district of Novgorod became known as the land of Rus'.

From among Rurik's entourage it also introduces two Swedish merchants Askold and Dir (in the chronicle they are called "boyars", probably because of their noble class). The names Askold (Old Norse: Haskuldr) and Dir (Old Norse: Dyri) are Swedish; the chronicle says that these two merchants were not from the family of Rurik, but simply belonged to his retinue. Later, the Primary Chronicle claims, they conquered Kiev and created the state of Kievan Rusʹ (which may have been preceded by the Rusʹ Khaganate).

=== Arabic sources ===
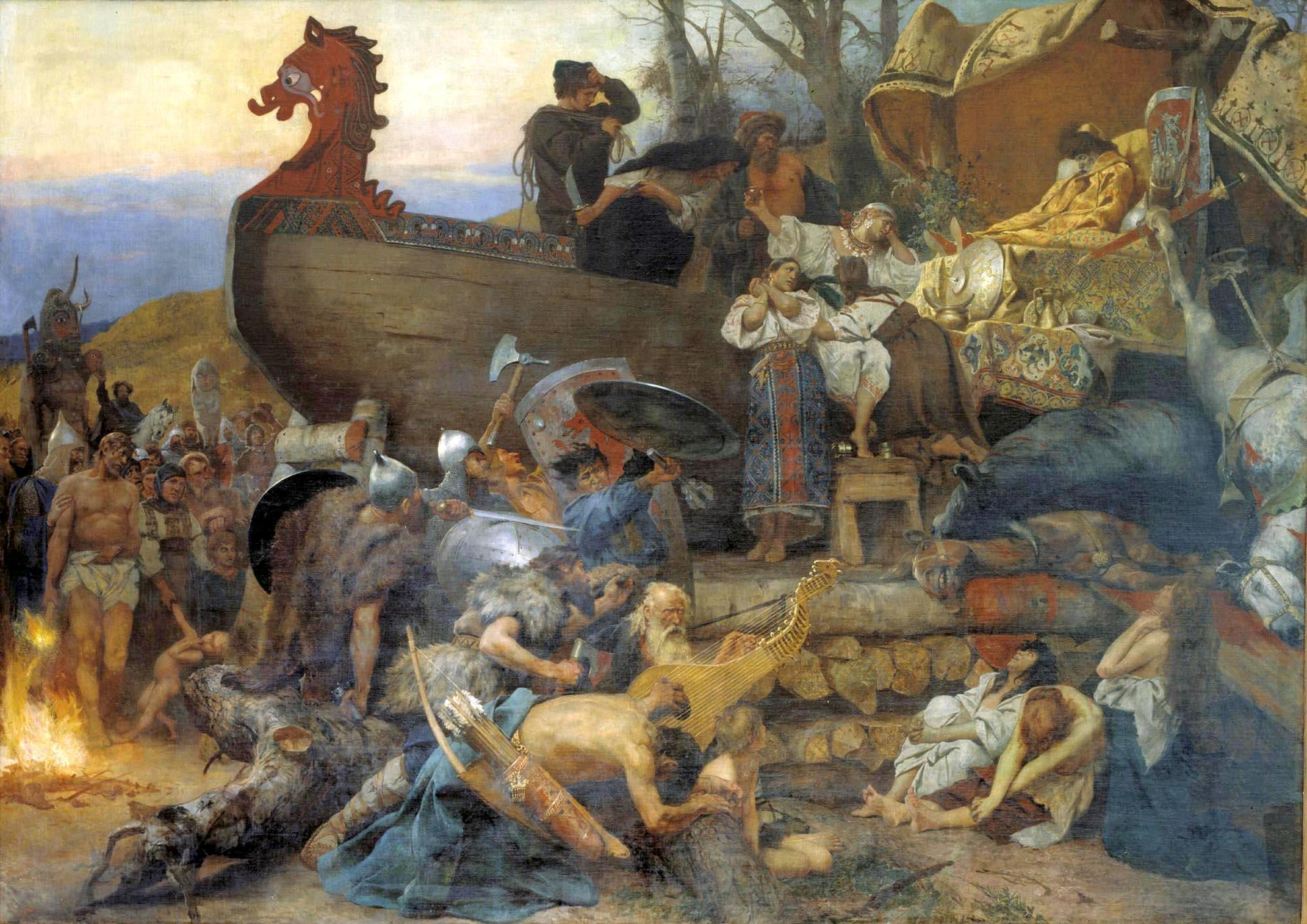
Ship burial of a Rus' chieftain as described by the Arab traveler Ahmad ibn Fadlan who visited north-eastern Europe in the 10th century. Henryk Siemiradzki (1883)

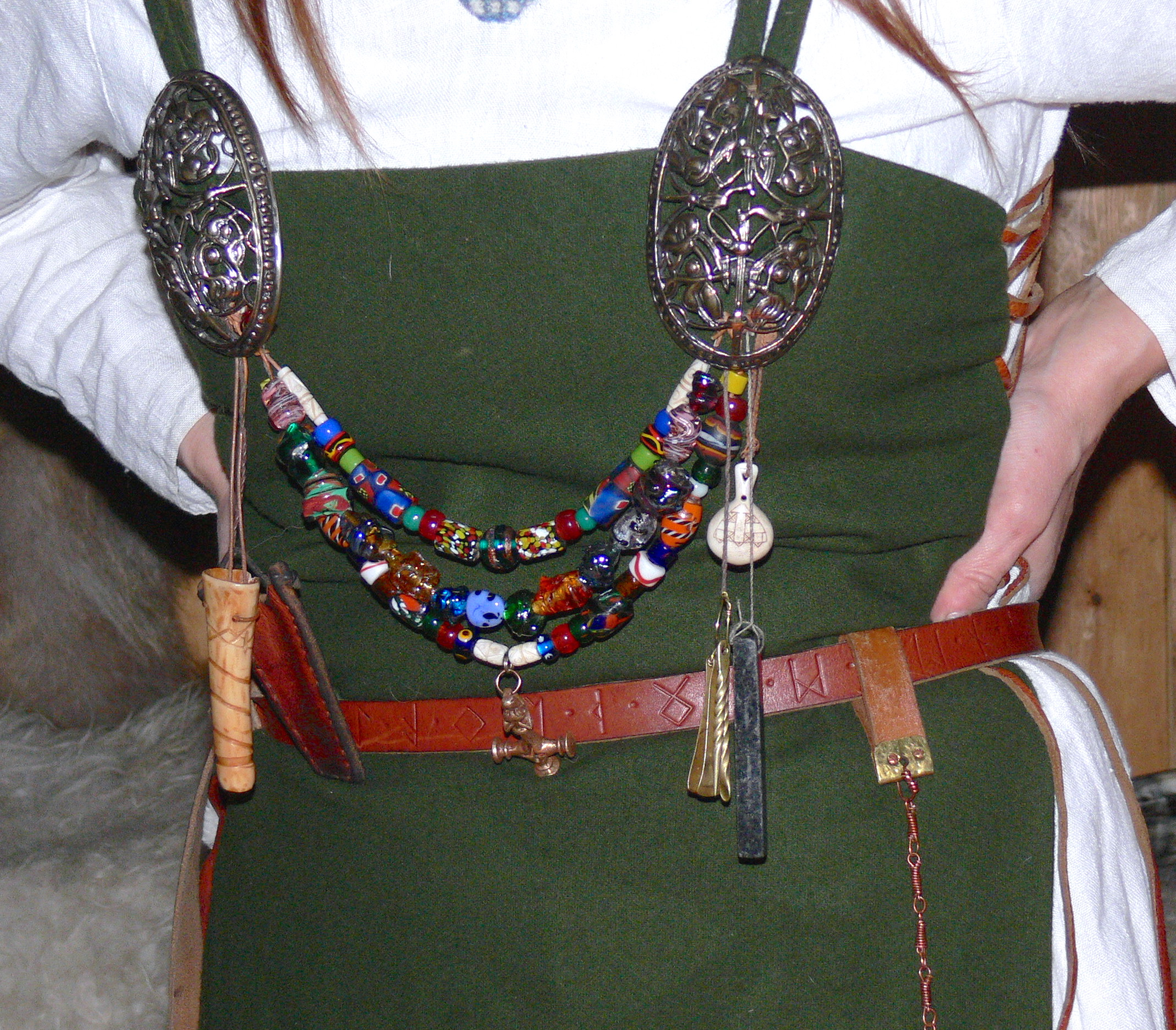
"Each woman wears on either breast a box of iron, silver, copper, or gold; the value of the box indicates the wealth of the husband."

Arabic-language sources for the Rus' people are relatively numerous, with over 30 relevant passages in roughly contemporaneous sources. It can be difficult to be sure that when Arabic sources talk about Rus' they mean the same thing as modern scholars. Sometimes it seems to be a general term for Scandinavians: when Al-Yaqūbi recorded Rūs attacking Seville in 844, he was almost certainly talking about Vikings based in Frankia. At other times, it might denote people other than or alongside Scandinavians: thus the Mujmal al-Tawarikh calls the Khazars and Rus' 'brothers'; later, Muhammad al-Idrisi, Al-Qazwini, and Ibn Khaldun all identified the Rus' as a sub-group of the Turks. These uncertainties have fed into debates about the origins of the Rus'.

Arabic sources for the Rus' had been collected, edited and translated for Western scholars by the mid-20th century. However, relatively little use was made of the Arabic sources in studies of the Rus' before the 21st century. This is partly because they mostly concern the region between the Black and the Caspian Seas, and from there north along the lower Volga and the Don. This made them less relevant than the Primary Chronicle to understanding European state formation further west. Imperialist ideologies, in Russia and more widely, discouraged research emphasising an ancient or distinctive history for Inner Eurasian peoples. Arabic sources portray Rus' people fairly clearly as a raiding and trading diaspora, or as mercenaries, under the Volga Bulghars or the Khazars, rather than taking a role in state formation.

The most extensive Arabic account of the Rus' is by the Muslim diplomat and traveller Ahmad ibn Fadlan, who visited Volga Bulgaria in 922, and described people under the label Rūs/Rūsiyyah at length, beginning thus:

I have seen the Rus as they came on their merchant journeys and encamped by the Itil. I have never seen more perfect physical specimens, tall as date palms, blond and ruddy; they wear neither tunics nor caftans, but the men wear a garment which covers one side of the body and leaves a hand free. Each man has an axe, a sword, and a knife, and keeps each by him at all times. The swords are broad and grooved, of Frankish sort. Each woman wears on either breast a box of iron, silver, copper, or gold; the value of the box indicates the wealth of the husband. Each box has a ring from which depends a knife. The women wear neck-rings of gold and silver. Their most prized ornaments are green glass beads. They string them as necklaces for their women.

— quoted in Gwyn Jones, A History of the Vikings

Apart from Ibn Fadlan's account, scholars draw heavily on the evidence of the Persian traveler Ibn Rustah who, it is postulated, visited Novgorod (or Tmutarakan, according to George Vernadsky) and described how the Rus' exploited the Slavs.

As for the Rus, they live on an island ... that takes three days to walk round and is covered with thick undergrowth and forests; it is most unhealthy. ... They harry the Slavs, using ships to reach them; they carry them off as slaves and…sell them. They have no fields but simply live on what they get from the Slav's lands. ... When a son is born, the father will go up to the newborn baby, sword in hand; throwing it down, he says, "I shall not leave you with any property: You have only what you can provide with this weapon."

— Ibn Rustah

=== Byzantine sources ===
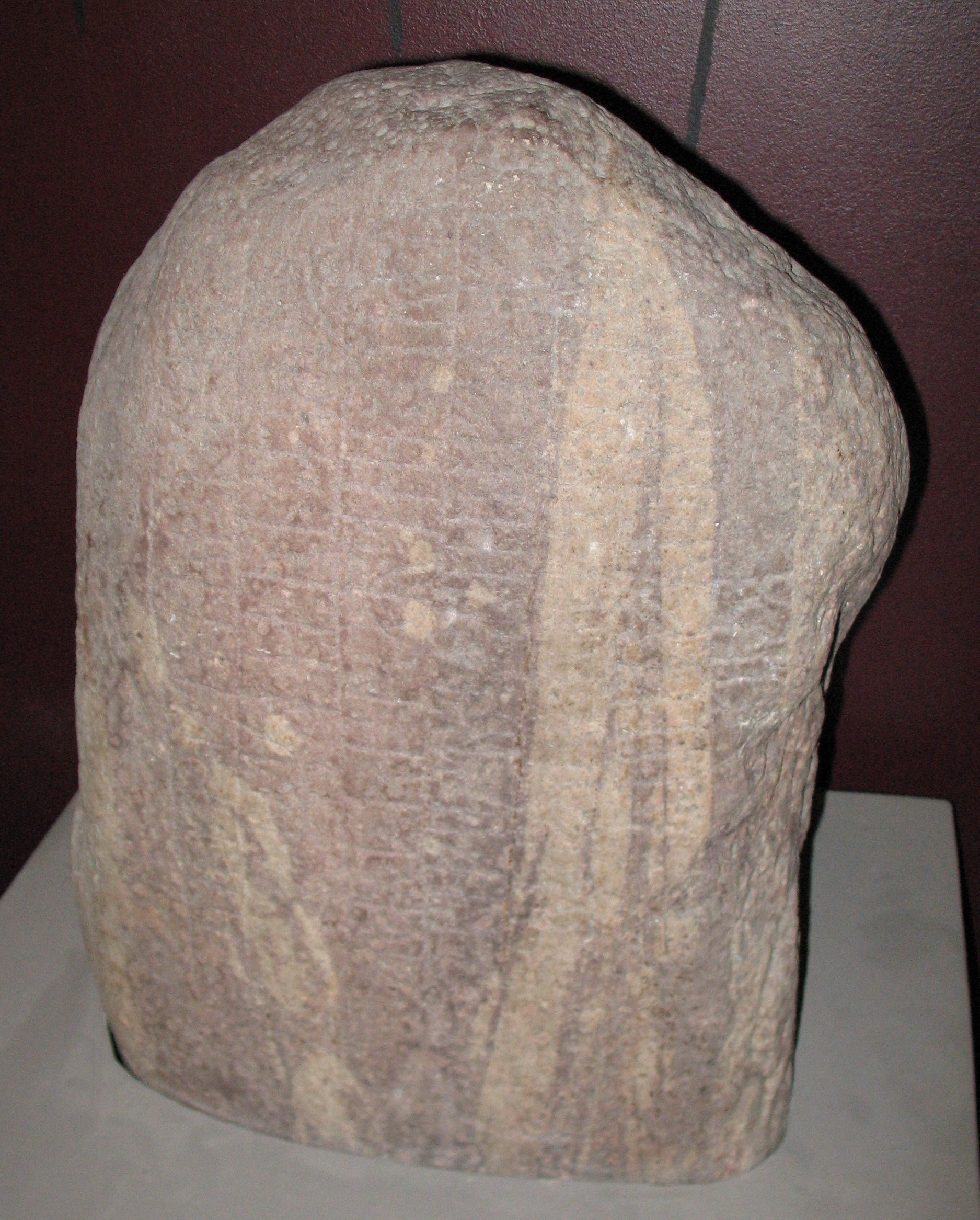
The Pilgårds runestone, which tells of two locations at the Dniepr cataracts, Eifor (one of the rapids) and Rufstein (Rvanyj Kamin').

When the Varangians first appeared in Constantinople (the Paphlagonian expedition of the Rusʹ in the 820s and the Siege of Constantinople in 860), the Byzantines seem to have perceived these people, whom they called the Rhos (Greek: Ῥώς), as a different people from the Slavs. At least no source says they are part of the Slavic race. Characteristically, Pseudo-Simeon and Theophanes Continuatus refer to the Rhos as dromitai (Δρομῖται), a word related to the Greek word meaning a run, suggesting the mobility of their movement by waterways.

In his treatise De Administrando Imperio, Constantine VII describes the Rhos as the neighbours of Pechenegs who buy from the latter cows, horses, and sheep "because none of these animals may be found in Rhosia"; his description represents the Rus' as a warlike northern tribe. Constantine also enumerates the names of the Dnieper cataracts in both rhosisti ('ῥωσιστί', the language of the Rus') and sklavisti ('σκλαβιστί', the language of the Slavs). The Rus' names are usually etymologised as Old Norse. An argument used to support this view is that the name Aeifor in reference to the fourth cataract is also attested on the Pilgårds runestone from the 10th c. on Gotland. However, some researches indicate that at least several of the Rus' names can be Slavic and, as for the Dnieper cataract Aeifar / Aeifor, its name doesn't have an acceptable and convincing Scandinavian etymology. At the time, the Byzantines also recorded the existence of some of the lesser important Slavic tribes in the region, and the emperor only knew of Rhosia, which referred to the Rus' who lived in Kiev, closer to Byzantium, and the Rus' who lived in the north, along the Volkhov River.

Constantine's form for the non-Slavonic names	Latin transliteration	Constantine's interpretation of the Slavonic or both	Proposed Old Norse etymons for the non-Slavonic names	Proposed Slavic etymons for the non-Slavonic names
Ἐσσουπῆ	Essoupi	"Do not sleep!"	nes uppi "upper promontory" súpandi "slurping"	не спи (ne spy) "do not sleep!" (compare the Ukrainian не спи /ne spɪ/ "do not sleep!")
Οὐλβορσί	Oulvorsi	"the Island of the Barrage"	Úlfarsey "Úlfar's island" hólm-foss "island rapid"	—
Γελανδρί	Gelandri	"Noise of the Barrage"	gjallandi/gellandi "yelling, loudly ringing"	—
Ἀειφάρ, Ἀειφόρ	Aeifar, Aeifor	... because the pelicans nest in the stones of the barrage ...	æ-fari/ey-færr "never passable" æ-for/ey-forr "ever fierce"	—
Βαρουφόρος	Varouforos	... because it forms a large lake ...	vara-foss "stony shore rapid" báru-foss "wave rapid"	—
Λεάντι	Leanti	"the Boiling of the Water"	hlæjandi "laughing"	lьjant'i (< Proto-Slavic *lьjǫtji) "the one that pours" derived from lьjati (Proto-Slavic *lьjati) "to pour" (compare the Ukrainian лляти /ˈlʲːɑtɪ/ "to pour" and the Polish lać /lat͡ɕ/ "to pour")
Στρούβουν, Στρούκουν	Strouvoun, Stroukoun	"Little Barrage"	strjúkandi "stroking, delicately touching" strukum, "rapid current"	стрибун (strybun) "the one that jumps" from the Ukrainian стрибати /strɪˈbatɪ/ "to jump"

=== Western European sources ===
The first Western European source to mention the Rus' are the Annals of St. Bertin (Annales Bertiniani). These relate that Emperor Louis the Pious' court at Ingelheim, in 839, was visited by a delegation from the Byzantine emperor. In this delegation there were men who called themselves Rhos (in the Latin text, ... qui se, id est gentem suam, Rhos vocari dicebant, ...; translated by Aleksandr Nazarenko as ... who stated that they, i.e. their nation, were called Rhos, ...). Once Louis enquired the reason of their arrival (in the Latin text, ... Quorum adventus causam imperator diligentius investigans, ...), he learnt that they were Swedes (eos gentis esse Sueonum; verbatim, their nation is Sveoni). Fearing that they were spies, he detained them, before letting them proceed after receiving reassurances from Byzantium. Subsequently, in the 10th and 11th centuries, Latin sources routinely confused the Rus' with the tribe of Rugians. Olga of Kiev, for instance, was designated as queen of the Rugians (reginae Rugorum) in the Lotharingian Chronicle compiled by the anonymous continuator of Regino of Prüm. At least after the 6th century, the name of the Rugii referred to Slavic speaking peoples including the Rus'. According to the Annals of St. Bertin, the Rus' leader had the title Khagan (... quod rex illorum, Chacanus vocabulo, ...).

Another source comes from Liutprand of Cremona, a 10th-century Lombard bishop whose Antapodosis, a report from Constantinople to Holy Roman Emperor Otto I, says that Constantinople 'stands in territory surrounded by warlike peoples. On the north it has the ... Rusii sometimes called by another name Nordmanni, and the Bulgarii who live too close for harmony'.

== Assimilation ==
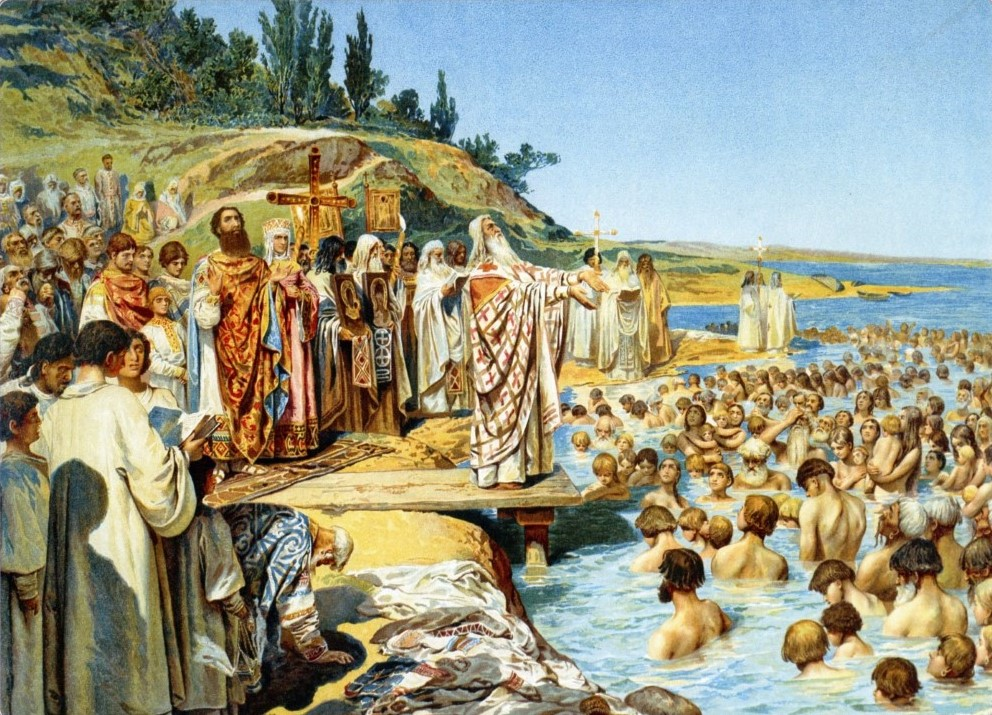
The Baptism of Kievans, a painting by Klavdiy Lebedev

The Scandinavian influence in Kievan Rus' was most important during the late 9th c. and during the 10th c. In 976, Vladimir the Great (Valdamarr gamli) fled from his brother Yaropolk to Sweden, ruled by Erik the Victorious, where he gathered an invasion force that he used to conquer Kievan Rus'. Vladimir was initially a pagan who is reported by the Primary Chronicle to have worshiped Perun and Veles, and this is probably a Slavic translation of the corresponding Norse gods Thor and Freyr, who beside Odin were the two most important gods to the Swedes. However, in 988, he converted to the Eastern Orthodox Church, whereas the Norse in Scandinavia remained Norse pagans or converted to the Catholic Church. After this, the Norse influence decreased considerably both in character and in size, and in the 11th c. the Norse are mentioned as Varangian mercenaries and employees serving the princely family.

Elena A. Melnikova at the Russian Academy of Sciences notes that in Russian historiography, the assimilation of the Norse Rus' is presented as a very rapid affair, based on studies of material culture. However, material objects are not as strong an indicator of ethnic identity as the language spoken in a society. Usually, the only non-archaeological claim to rapid assimilation is the appearance of three Slavic names in the princely family, i.e. Svjatoslav, Predslava, and Volodislav, for the first time in the treaty with Byzantium of 944. Another reason for assuming a rapid assimilation is given by Yaroslav Shchapov, who writes that as a consequence of the Rus' adoption of Byzantine (Eastern) rather than Roman Christianity, as well as the assimilation of Byzantine culture, "writing, literature and law in the national language" spread much earlier than in Western countries.

Melnikova comments that the disappearance of Norse funeral traditions c. 1000, is better explained with Christianisation and the introduction of Christian burial rites, a view described with some reservations by archaeologist Przemysław Urbańczyk of the Institute of Archeology and Ethnology at the Polish Academy of Sciences. So the lack of Norse burials from c. 1000 is not a good indicator of assimilation into Slavic culture, and shows instead that the Rus' had turned Orthodox Christian. Also the use of material objects is more connected to change in fashion and to change of social status than it is to ethnical change. She also notes that no systematic studies of the various elements that manifest ethnic identity in relation to the Rus' has been done to support the theory of rapid assimilation, in spite of the fact that "[t]he most important indications of ethno-cultural self-identification are language and literacy."

=== Urban ===
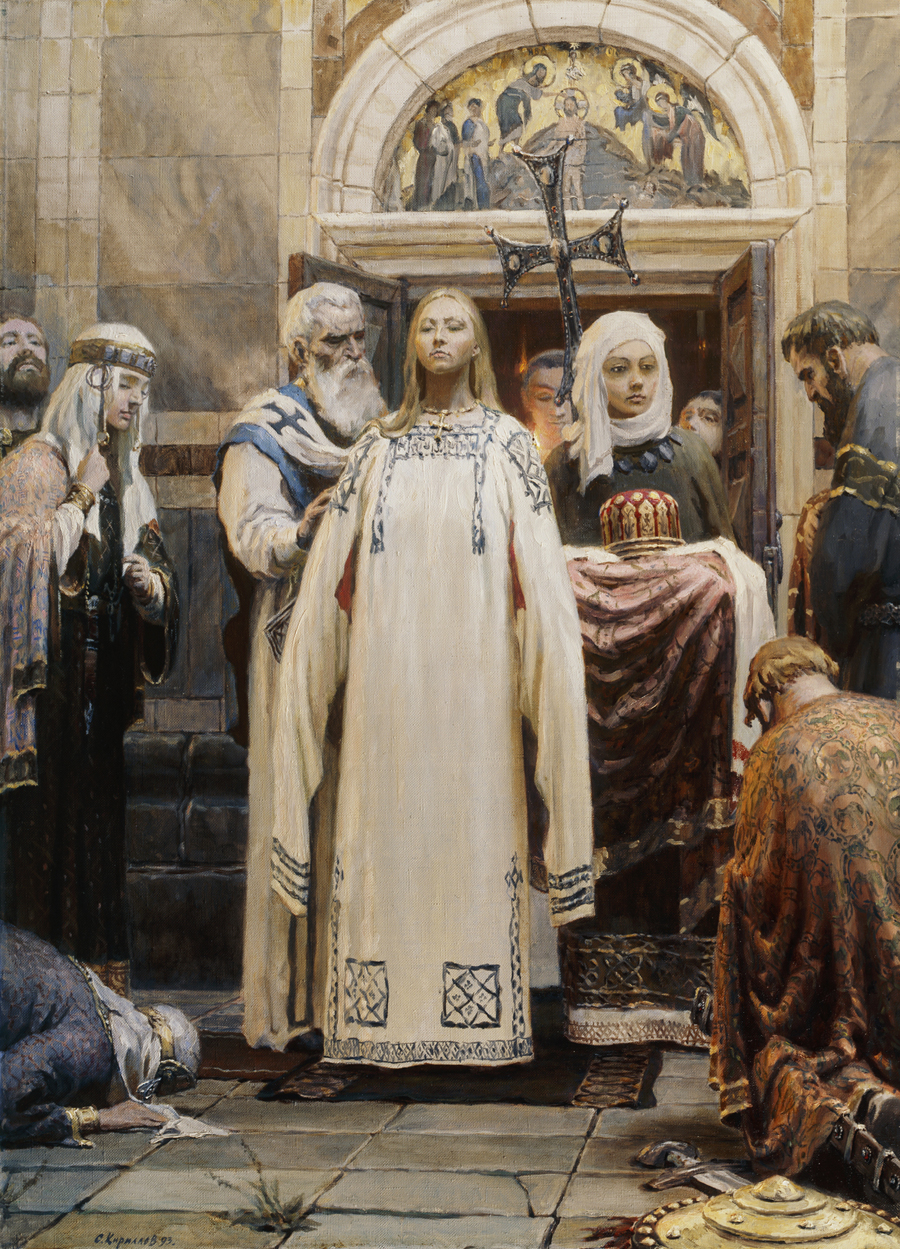
Princess Olga (Baptism), 1993 painting by Sergei Kirillov. In Olga's time, the Norse elite started to become bilingual and also speak Old East Slavic.

The Rus' elite became bilingual c. 950 but it was not until the end of the 11th century that Old East Slavic can be shown to have become their native language. Until the mid-10th century all the attested Rus' names were Norse. In the Rus'–Byzantine Treaty of 944 or 945 there are 76 names among whom 12 belong to the ruling family, 11 to emissaries, 27 to other agents, and 26 to merchants. In the princely family, there are three Slavic names Svjatoslav, son of prince Igor' (Ingvar) and Volodislav and Predslava (of unknown relation). The other members of the family have Norse names, i.e. Olga (Helga), Akun (Hákon), Sfanda (Svanhildr), Uleb (Óleifr), Turd (Þórðr), Arfast (Arnfastr), and Sfir'ka (Sverkir). The emissaries also have Old Norse names except for three who have Finnish names. Olga has a representative by the Finnish name Iskusevi, whereas Volodislav is represented by the Norse Uleb (Óleifr). Among the 27 agents there are some who have Finnish names, but none with Slavic, while among the 26 merchants there are three with Finnish names and two with Slavic.

In the 980s, among Sviatoslav's grandchildren, the Primary Chronicle informs that Vladimir the Great had twelve sons and one daughter. Only one of them, a son, had a Norse name, Gleb (Guðleifr), whereas the other children had Slavic compound names mostly ending with -slav ("fame"). After this generation, the ruling dynasty restricted itself to five Norse male names and one female name, of which the most popular ones would be Oleg, Igor and Gleb (was murdered in 1015 and canonised). The name Rurik (Hrœrekr) reappears in the mid-11th c. but stays restricted in use. Among female names, only Olga stays popular. The Norse names Hákon, Óleifr, and Ivarr remain in use among the East Slavic nobility, but Norse names become rarer at the end of the 10th c. which may point to increased assimilation of the Rus' into the Slavic population.

Among the Norse names that are not used in the ruling family, there is great variation in how they are spelled in the treaties. All names except for Oleg, Olga and Igor are spelled as closely to Old Norse as was possible in Old East Slavic. There were also variations in how the vowels were presented Óleifr was shown as Oleb or Uleb, Hákon as Jakun and Akun, Arnfastr as Arfast and Fastr as Fost. The interdentals /þ/ and /ð/ are rendered as d, but also rarely as z or t as in Turd from Þórðr and in Vuzlev from Guðleifr. The Fr- in the beginning of names which was common in Old Norse but rare in Old East Slavic usually appeared as Pr- as in Prasten from Freysteinn. There was no standard way of spelling ON names.

While the Primary Chronicle uses the same Slavicised forms throughout, rendering Helgi as Ol(e)g, Helga as Ol'ga, Ingvarr as Igor' and Guðleifr as Gleb, they are unlikely to represent the form the names had at the end of the 10th c. Foreign sources give forms closer to the Old Norse originals. Byzantine sources from the second half of the 10th c. preserve the nasalisation in Ingvarr, and in the Cambridge document written in Hebrew, Helgi appears as HLGW, with initial H-. The adaptation of Guðleifr was still not complete by 1073, as shown in a manuscript where there is a vowel between G- and -l- in Gleb, showing that the name is still pronounced with an initial Gu-. Theses sources reflect authentic Old Norse pronunciation of these names, which shows that the adaptation of these names did not take place in the 10th c. but was finished a century later.

When the Primary Chronicle was written in 1113, the annalist used the already fully adapted Old East Slavic forms and he does not appear to have known that Gleb and Vuzlev both represented Guðleifr, but instead kept them distinct. Later in the 12th c., in spite of the renown of the name Igor', the original Norse form Ingvar was borrowed again as a separate name, and it appears in the Hypatian Codex as the name of Ingvar Yaroslavich (d. 1212), and two princes of Ryazan. One of the latter was named Ingvar Igorevich, mentioned in 1207–1219, which shows that the two names were no longer connected. Consequently, Melnikova, considers that the 12th c. stands in stark contrast to the previous two centuries, showing that the Slavicisation of the Rus' elite would have been complete after the second half of the 11th c.

On the other hand, the scholar Omeljan Pritsak considered that Old Norse must have been well known in Kiev and Novgorod, especially during the early decades of the 12th century. The linguist and literary theorist Roman Jakobson held a contrasting opinion, writing that Bojan, active at the court of Yaroslav the Wise, and some of whose poetry may be preserved in the epic poem The Tale of Igor's Campaign, or Slovo, in Old East Slavic, may have heard Scandinavian songs and conversations from visitors as late as 1110 (about the time his own work was done), and that even later, at the court of Mstislav (Haraldr), there must have been many opportunities to hear them. He cautions, however, that it cannot be presumed that Old Norse was still habitually spoken in 12th-century princely courts. Further, he says that Bojan's own life and career did not necessarily coincide with the time of the men whose lives he commemorated, and that he may have written of princes of an earlier period known to him only by report. Scholarly consensus holds as well that the author of the national epic, Slovo, writing in the late 12th century, was not composing in a milieu where there was still a flourishing school of poetry in the Old Norse language.

=== Rural ===
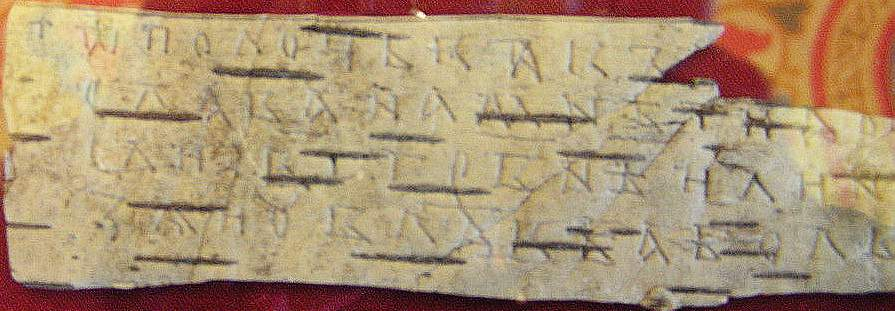
Birch bark letter No. 155, 12th century

There are remains of Old Norse culture as late as the 14th and early 15th centuries in the form of runic or rune-like inscriptions and as personal names. The c. 1000 birch-bark letters from Novgorod contain hundreds of names, most of them Slavic or Christian, and according to Melnikova there are seven letters with Old Norse names, but Sitzman identifies as many as 18, including Staraja Russa no. 36.

The oldest of these letters (no. 526) is from the 1080s, and refers to Asgut from a village in the vicinity of Lake Seliger which was on the road between Novgorod and the central parts of Kievan Rus'. Another letter (no. 130) is from the second half of the 14th century and was sent to Novgorod from another part of the Novgorod Republic and mentions the names Vigar' (Vigeirr or Végeirr), Sten (steinn) of Mikula, Jakun (Hákon), and the widow of a second Jakun. The most interesting of the letters (no. 2) mentions a place called Gugmor-navolok, which may derive from Guðmarr, and two people living in the vicinity called Vozemut (Guðmundr) and Vel'jut (Véljótr). Perhaps a Guðmarr once settled near a portage (navolok) on the route to Lake Onega and naming traditions were preserved in the settlement until the 14th century It is unlikely that he was a new settler because there are no traces of 14th-century immigration, nor are there any Scandinavian remains. It is likely that his people adopted the local material culture but kept the family naming traditions.

Sten, the man from Mikula, could be a visitor from Sweden or Swedish-speaking Finland, but the other letters suggest people who had Norse names but were otherwise part of the local culture. They appear together with people of Slavic names and take part in the same activities, and they lived in scattered villages in the north-east periphery of the Novgorod Republic. The area was visited by Novgorod tribute collectors in the 11th century, and was integrated in the republic through colonisation during the 12th and 13th centuries. Since Varangians were part of the administration of Novgorod they likely ventured in the area and sometimes settled there. The use of their naming traditions in the 14th century show the conservatism of some of the Rus' traditions.

The runic script survived for some time in remote parts of Kievan Rus', as evidenced by two finds. One of them is a weaver's slate spindle-whorl found in Zvenigorod in the south-westerm part of Kievan Rus'. The whorl has the runic inscription si{X}riþ, representing the Norse female name Sigrið on the flat top and two crosses and two f runes on the side. The whorl is dated thanks to being found in a layer from the period 1115–1130, when the settlement grew and became a town. No other Scandinavian finds were made except for two other whorls with runic-like inscriptions from the same time. Another whorl with a runic-like inscription was found in the old Russian fort of Plesnesk not far from Zvenigorod. This was a strategically important location and there are several warrior burials dating to the late 10th c. These graves belonged to warriors of a rank similar to a Kievan grand prince and some of them could have been of Scandinavian descent.

The inscriptions could be from descendants of the Rus' who settled in the area as protection for the western border of Kievan Rus'. The inscription shows archaic features and the g rune (X) is from the Elder Futhark, which could be due to copying the inscription from generation to generation. In that case the name Sigriðr was inherited for generations in the family. However, the f runes show that this was not the case, because the rune and the cross have similar meaning, although in different religions. Only those who had adhered to Norse paganism and later converted to Christianity would understand their significance, which necessitates a survival of old Norse traditions. It is possible that this community of descendants of late 10th-century Rus' who lived in a remote area of Kievan Rus' preserved family names, runic lore in archaic forms, ancestral beliefs and some of the Old Norse language, as evidenced by the runes.

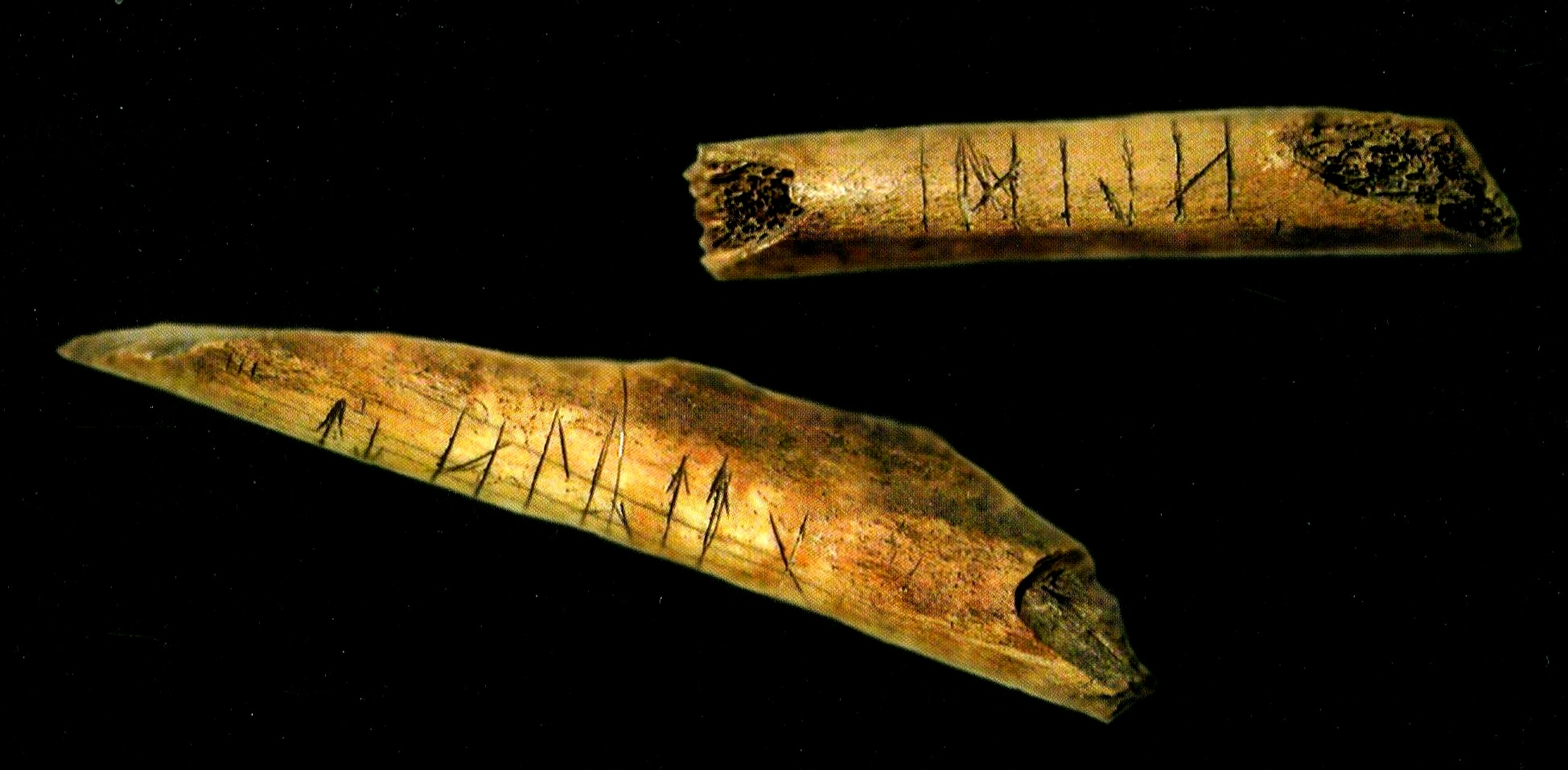
Two 12th–13th c. runic inscriptions from Maskovichi.

There is another set of inscriptions that look like runes from an old fortification named Maskovichi, on the river route of Western Dvina. It was on the Latvian border and could control the river, although it was located several km away. The fort was used in the 12th and 13th century, and would later turn into a small castle. C. 110 bone fragments with graffiti have been found and they include inscriptions and pictures of warriors and weapons. The runic-like inscriptions are only three to six letters long and some can be interpreted. Some 30 of them are clearly Cyrillic, while 48 are runic. Some of the runic inscriptions are written with mirror-runes (right-to-left) and are illegible, but several can be read as personal names, words and individual runes. The reading of them is uncertain, but they were made by people who knew or remembered runes.

Consequently, in Kievan Rus' there were descendants of the Rus' who preserved parts of their heritage during centuries, the countryside being more conservative than towns.

== Legacy ==
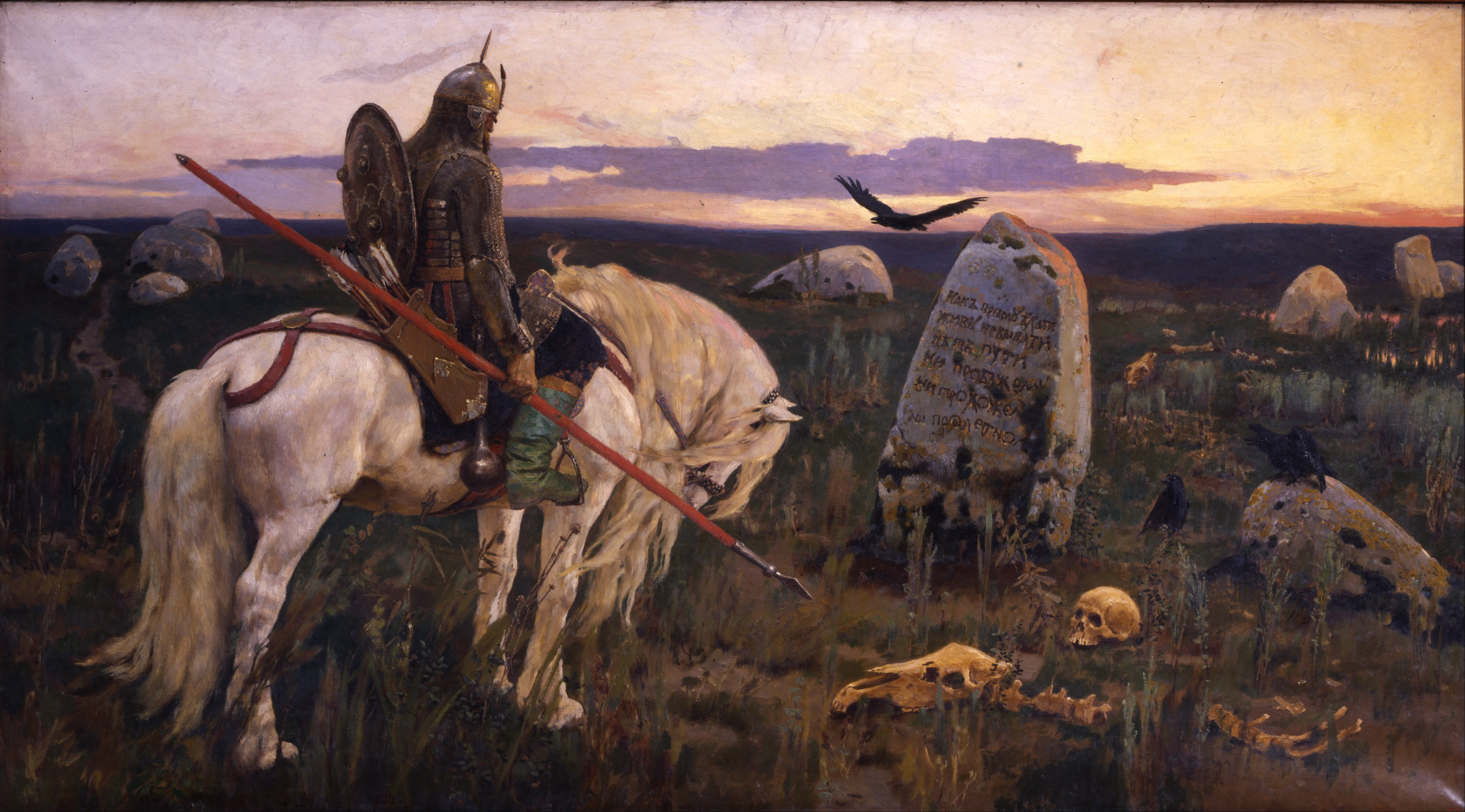
"A vitjaz' at the Crossroads" (Витязь на распутье), by Viktor Vasnetsov (1882)

The Norse influence is considered to have left many traces on the Old East Slavic legal code, the Russkaja Pravda, and on literary works such as The Tale of Igor's Campaign, and even on the Byliny, which are old heroic tales about the early Kievan Rus' (Vladimir the Great and others), where one of the words for "hero" is derived from Viking, i.e. vitjaz' (витязь). Several scholars note that this is "of considerable importance generally, as far as social and cultural background of language is concerned". Although, they also note that parallels may arise from general similarities between Germanic and Slavic societies, they state that these similarities remain a profitable field of comparative studies.

Russian contains several layers of Germanic loanwords that need to be separated from the North Germanic words that entered Old East Slavic during the Viking Age. Estimations of the number of loan words from Old Norse into Russian vary from author to author ranging from more than 100 words (Forssman) down to as low as 34 (Kiparsky) and 30 (Strumiński), including personal names. According to the most critical and conservative analysis, commonly used ON words include knut ("knout"), seledka ("herring"), šelk ("silk"), and jaščik ("box"), whereas varjag ("Varangian"), stjag ("flag") and vitjaz' ("hero", from viking) mostly belong to historical novels. Many belong to a special field and ceased to be commonly used in the 13th c., such as berkovets (from ON *birkisk, i.e. "Birka/birk pound", referring to 164 kg), varjag, vitjaz', gol(u)bec (from gulf meaning "box", "crate" or "shed"), grid', gridi (from griði, grimaðr meaning a "king's bodyguard"), lar' (from *lári, lárr meaning "chest", "trunk"), pud (from pund referring to 16.38 kg), Rus' (see etymology section above), skala (skál, "scale"), ti(v)un (thiónn, "Novgorod official" in the 12th c.), šelk (*silki, "silk"), and jabeda (embætti, "office").

Norse settlers also left many toponyms across north-western Russia, where the names of settlements or nearby creeks reveal the name of the Norse settler, or where he came from. A man named Asviðr settled in a place today known as Ašvidovo, Bófastr in Buchvostovo, Dýrbjǫrn in Djurbenevo, Einarr in Inarevo, Kynríkr in Kondrikovo, Rødríkr in Redrikovo, Ragnheiðr in Rognedino, Snæbjǫrn in Sneberka, Sveinn in Sven', Siófastr in Suchvostovo, Steingrímr in Stegrimovo, and Thorbjǫrn in Turyborovo. More common Norse names have left several toponyms, such as Ivarr in Ivorovo and Ivorovka, Hákon in Jakunovo and Jakunicha, Oléf in Ulebovo, Olebino and Olibov, and Bjǫrn, appears in Bernovo, Bernjatino, Bemniški, Bernavo, and in Bernoviči. There is also Veliž which is the same place name as Vællinge, an old estate near Stockholm, in Sweden. Many place names also contain the word Varangian, such as Varegovo, Varež(ka), Varyzki, Varjaža, Verjažino, and Verjažka. Other names recall the Kolbangians, such as Kolbežycze, Kolbjagi, and Kolbižicy, and a group called "Burangians" (Byringar), in the names Burjaži, Buregi, Burigi, Burezi, Burjaki, Burjaz', etc.

As for other influences on the Russian language, they are less apparent, and could be due to coincidence. In Old Norse and the modern Scandinavian languages (except for the Jutish dialect of Danish), the definite article is used as an enclitic article after the noun. In Europe, this is otherwise only known from Basque and from the Balkan sprachbund, in languages such as Macedonian and Bulgarian. However, it also appears in dialects in Northern Russia, too far away from Bulgarian to have been influenced by it. As standard Russian has no definite article at all, the appearance of a postpositioned definite article in Northern Russian dialects may be due to influence from Old Norse. As for standard Russian, just like in Old Norse, and in the modern Scandinavian languages, there is a passive construction using an enclitic reflexive pronoun, -s in North Germanic and -s'(a) in Russian. However, it is not known from written Russian before the 15th c. and a corresponding construction has appeared independently in modern Romance languages, e.g. Italian vendesi.

== Archaeology ==
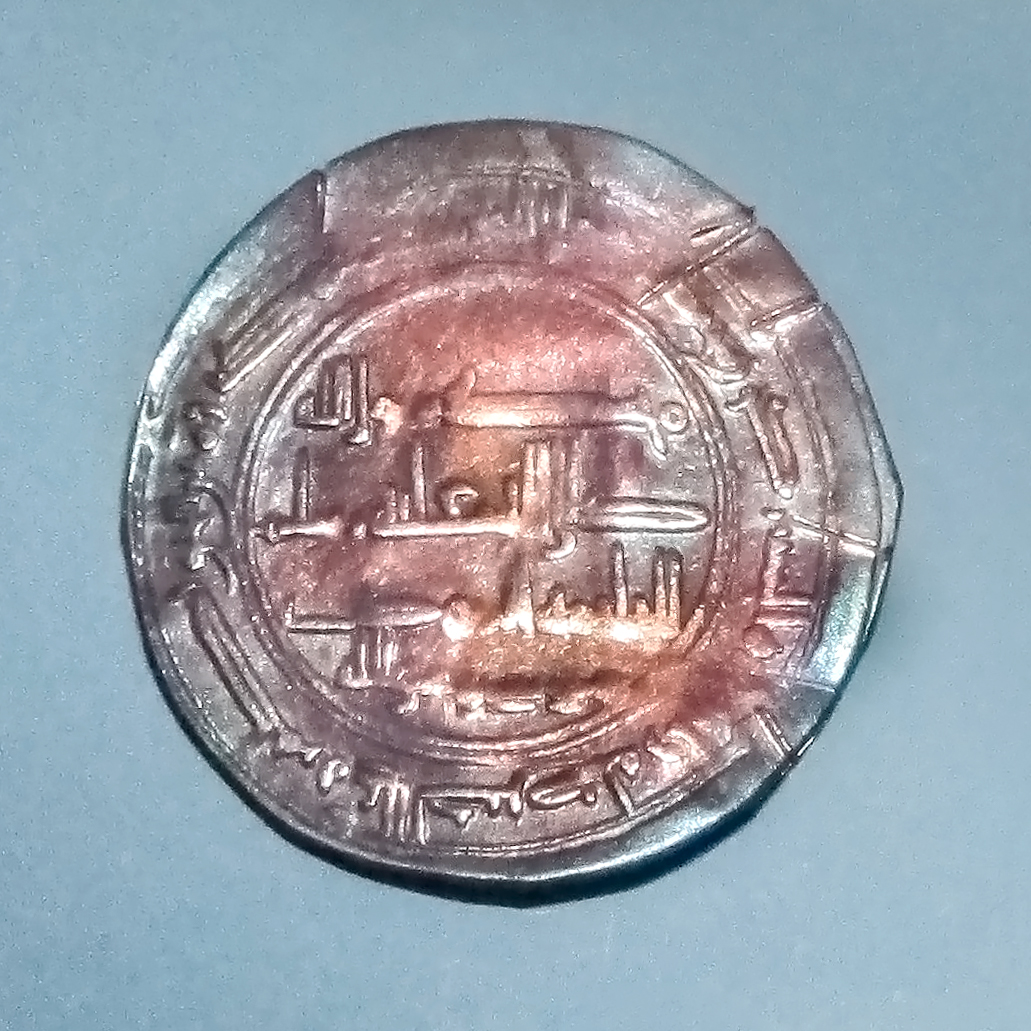
Early 9th-century Khazar coin, found in the Spillings Hoard in Gotland.

Numerous artefacts of Scandinavian affinity have been found in northern Russia (as well as artefacts of Slavic origin in Sweden). However, exchange between the northern and southern shores of the Baltic had occurred since the Iron Age (albeit limited to immediately coastal areas). Northern Russia and adjacent Finnic lands had become a profitable meeting ground for peoples of diverse origins, especially for the trade of furs, and attracted by the presence of oriental silver from the mid-8th century AD. There is an undeniable presence of goods and people of Scandinavian origin; however, the predominant people remained the local (Baltic and Finnic) peoples.

In the 21st century, analyses of the rapidly growing range of archaeological evidence further noted that high-status 9th- to 10th-century burials of both men and women in the vicinity of the Upper Volga exhibit material culture largely consistent with that of Scandinavia (though this is less the case away from the river, or further downstream). This has been seen as further demonstrating the Scandinavian character of elites in "Old Rusʹ".

There is uncertainty as to how small the Scandinavian migration to Rus' was, but some recent archaeological work has argued for a substantial number of 'free peasants' settling in the upper Volga region.

The quantity of archaeological evidence for the regions where the Rus' people were active grew steadily through the 20th century, and beyond, and the end of the Cold War made the full range of material increasingly accessible to researchers. Key excavations have included those at Staraya Ladoga, Novgorod, Rurikovo Gorodische, Gnyozdovo, Shestovitsa, numerous settlements between the Upper Volga and the Oka. Twenty-first century research, therefore, is giving the synthesis of archaeological evidence an increasingly prominent place in understanding the Rus'. The distribution of coinage, including the early 9th-century Peterhof Hoard, has provided important ways to trace the flow and quantity of trade in areas where Rus' were active, and even, through graffiti on the coins, the languages spoken by traders.

There is also a great number of Varangian runestones, on which voyages to the east (Austr) are mentioned.

In the mythical lays of the Poetic Edda, after her true love Sigurd is killed, Brunhild (Brynhildr in Old Norse) has eight slave girls and five serving maids killed and then stabs herself with her sword so that she can be with him in Valhalla, as told in The Short Lay of Sigurd, similarly to the sacrifices of slave girls that Ibn Fadlan described in his eyewitness accounts of the Rus'. Swedish ship burials sometimes contain both males and females. According to the website of Arkeologerna (The Archaeologists), part of the National Historical Museums in Sweden, archaeologists have also found in an area outside of Uppsala a boat burial that contained the remains of a man, a horse and a dog, along with personal items including a sword, spear, shield, and an ornate comb. Swedish archeologists believe that during the Viking age Scandinavian human sacrifice was still common and that there were more grave offerings for the deceased in the afterlife than in earlier traditions that sacrificed human beings to the gods exclusively. The inclusion of weapons, horses and slave girls in graves also seems to have been practiced by the Rus'.

== Historiography ==
Prior to the 18th century, it was the consensus of Russian historians that the Rus' arose out of the native Slavic populations of the region. This changed following a 1749 presentation by German historian Gerhardt Friedrich Müller before the Russian Academy of Sciences, built in part on earlier work by Gottlieb-Siegfried Bayer and based on primary sources, particularly the Russian Primary Chronicle. He suggested that the founders of the Rus' were ethnically Scandinavian Varangians, what became known as the 'Normanist' view. Though Müller met with immediate nationalistic opprobrium, by the end of the century his views represented the consensus in Russian historiography. The attribution of a Slavic origin to the Rus' saw a politically motivated 'anti-Normanist' resurgence in the 20th century within the Soviet Union, and this revisionist view also received nationalistic support in the nation-building post-Soviet states, but the broad consensus of scholars is that the origin of the Rus' lies in Scandinavia.

== Genetics ==
The cemetery of Ostriv is located in the region along the Ros' River. By 2020, 67 inhumation graves had been excavated there and dated from the early 11th century. Most of the artefacts found there are uncommon in Ukraine, but typical for the East Baltic region. This suggests a complex multi-ethnic population, presumably consisting of Baltic region migrants and locals. The ancient DNA analysis shows that the tested individuals cluster with present-day Icelandic and East Baltic populations. They are on the edge of the variability of previously published Swedish Vikings and close to dated medieval individuals from Estonia.

== Bibliography ==
- Blöndal, Sigfús (2007). Benedikz, Benedikt S. (ed.). The Varangians of Byzantium. Cambridge University. ISBN 978-0-521-21745-3.
- Bandle, O., ed. (2002). The Nordic Languages, An International Handbook of the History of the North Germanic Languages. Vol. 1. Braunmüller, K.; Jahr, E. H.; Karker, A.; Naumann, H. P.; Teleman, U.; Consulting Editors: Elmevik, L.; Widmark, G. HSK 22.1. Berlin, New York: Walter de Gruyter.
- Brink, Stefan; Price, Price (2008). The Viking World. Routledge. ISBN 978-1-134-31826-1.
- Bury, John Bagnell; Gwatkin, Henry Melvill (1936). The Cambridge Medieval History, Volume 3. University Press. ISBN 0-415-32756-3.
- Christian, David (1999). A History of Russia, Mongolia, and Central Asia. Blackwell.
- Danylenko, Andrii (2004). "The name Rus': In search of a new dimension". Jahrbueher für Geschichte Osteuropas. 52: 1–32.
- Davidson, H.R. Ellis (1976). The Viking Road to Byzantium. Allen & Unwin.
- Davies, Norman (1996). Europe: A History. New York: Oxford University Press.
- DeVries, Kelly (1999). The Norwegian Invasion of England in 1066. Boydell & Brewer Ltd. ISBN 978-0-85115-763-4.
- Dolukhanov, Pavel M. (1996). The Early Slavs: Eastern Europe from the Initial Settlement to the Kievan Rus. New York: Longman.
- Duczko, Wladyslaw [in Polish] (2004). Viking Rus: Studies on the Presence of Scandinavians in Eastern Europe. The Northern World. Vol. 12. Brill. ISBN 90-04-13874-9.
- Franklin, Simon; Shepard, Jonathan (1996). The Emergence of Rus: 750–1200. Longman. ISBN 978-0-582-49091-8.
- Goehrke, C. (1992). Frühzeit des Ostslaven. Darmstadt: Wissenschaftliche Buchgesellschaft.
- Hellquist, Elof (1922). Svensk etymologisk ordbok [Swedish etymological dictionary] (in Swedish). Lund: Gleerup.
- Logan, F. Donald (2005). The Vikings in History. Taylor & Francis. ISBN 0-415-32756-3.
- Lunt, Horace Gray (1975). On the language of old Rus: some questions and suggestions. Harvard University, Harvard Ukrainian Research Institute.
- Magocsi, Paul R. (1996). A History of Ukraine. Toronto: University of Toronto Press.
- The Annals of Saint-Bertin. Ninth-Century Histories. Vol. 1. Translated by Nelson, Janet L. Manchester and New York. 1991.
- Pritsak, Omeljan (1981). The Origin of Rus'. Cambridge, Mass.: Harvard University Press.
- Stang, Hakon. (1996). The Naming of Russia. Oslo: Middelelser.
- Thorir Jonsson Hraundal (January 2014). "New Perspectives on Eastern Vikings/Rus in Arabic Sources". Viking and Medieval Scandinavia. 10: 65–97. doi:10.1484/J.VMS.5.105213.
- Tolochko, Olksiy P (2008). "The Primary Chronicle's 'Ethnography' Revisited: Slavs and Varangians in the Middle Dnieper Region and the Origin of the Rus' State". In Garipzanov, Ildar H.; Geary, Patrick J.; Urbańczyk, Przemysław (eds.). Franks, Northmen and Slavs. Identities and State Formation in Early Medieval Europe. Brepols.
- Waldman, Carl; Mason, Catherine (2005). Encyclopedia of European Peoples. Infobase Publishing. ISBN 1-4381-2918-1.
- Gerard Miller as the author of the Normanist theory (Brockhaus and Efron)
