= Interpretatio germanica =

Identification of Roman gods with their own deities by Germanic peoples

Interpretatio germanica is the practice by the Germanic peoples of identifying Roman gods with the names of Germanic deities. According to University of Bonn philologist Rudolf Simek, this occurred around the 1st century AD, when both cultures came into closer contact.

== Names of days of the week ==
Some evidence for interpretatio germanica exists in the Germanic translations of the Roman names for the days of the week from Roman deities into names of approximately equivalent Germanic deities:

- Sunday, the day of Sunnǭ (Old Norse: Sunna, Sól; Old English: Sunne; Old High German: Sunna), the sun (as female), was earlier the day of Sol, the sun (as male)
- Monday, the day of Mēnô (Máni; Mōna; Māno), the moon (as male), was earlier the day of Luna, the moon (as female)
- Tuesday, the day of Tīwaz (Týr; Tīw; Ziu), was earlier the day of Mars, god of war
- Wednesday, the day of Wōdanaz (Odin, Óðinn; Wōden; Wuotan), was earlier the day of Mercury, god of travelers and eloquence
- Thursday, the day of Þunraz (Thor, Þórr; Þunor; Donar), was earlier the day of Jupiter, god of thunder. The name is derived from Old English þunresdæg and Middle English Thuresday (with loss of -n-, first in northern dialects, from influence of Old Norse Þórsdagr), meaning "Thor's Day", after the Norse god of Thunder, Thor. The hammer-wielding Þunraz may elsewhere appear identified with the club-wielding Hercules.
- Friday, the day of Frijjō (Frigg; Frīg; Frīja), was earlier the day of Venus, goddess of love

In most of the Romance languages, which derive from Latin, days of the week still preserve the names of the original Roman deities, such as the Italian for Tuesday, martedì (from the Latin Martis dies).

The one exception to the use of Germanic gods is Saturday, which retains the name of a foreign god, possibly because there was no obvious Germanic substitute. The name of the day is associated with Saturn in many West Germanic languages; such as the English "Saturday", the West Frisian Saterdei, the Low German Saterdag, and the Dutch zaterdag all meaning Saturn's day.

== Dissenting view ==
Simek emphasizes the paucity of evidence for a widespread interpretatio germanica, as opposed to the well-attested opposite interpretatio romana, and notes that comparison with Roman gods is insufficient to reconstruct ancient Germanic gods, or equate them definitively with those of later Norse mythology.

== See also ==
- Translation of gods
  - Interpretatio graeca
  - Interpretatio romana
  - Interpretatio slavica
