= Koliada (deity) =

Slavic pseudo-deity

- Solar cycle
- God Koliada by Andrey Mazin

Koliada or Koleda (Bulgarian: Коледа, romanized: Koleda) is a Slavic pseudo-deity, a personification of the newborn winter Sun and symbol of the New Year's cycle. The figure of Koliada is connected with the solar cycle, (the Slavic root *kol- suggests a wheel or circularity) passing through the four seasons and from one substantial condition into another.

In the different Slavic countries at the koliada winter festival people performed rituals with games and songs in honour of the deity, such as the koleduvane. In some regions of Russia the ritual gifts (usually buns) for the koledari are also called kolyada. In the lands of the Croats, a doll called Koled symbolized Koliada. Koliada is mentioned either as a male or (more commonly) as a female deity in various songs.

== Holiday ==
There are many traditions that recall both the deity and the ritual of Koliada. All of them occur on or around Winter Solstice:

- Koleduvane is a ceremony with pagan roots that is still performed on Christmas Eve in many Slavic countries.
- Koleda is the modern Bulgarian word for Christmas.
- Koliadka, Koliada or Kaleda is a traditional song usually sung in Eastern Slavic countries (Belarus and Ukraine) only on Orthodox Christmas holidays, between the 7 and 14 of January
- Crăciun is the Romanian and Karácsony – the Hungarian word for Christmas. They are both derived from Korochun/Krachun - one of the names of the pagan holiday Koliada, although neither Romania nor Hungary are Slavic countries.
- Kalėdos is the Lithuanian word for Christmas.

There are Slavic neopagan communities in most of the Slavic countries whose goal is to popularize ancient pagan beliefs and practices in present-day society.

== In music ==
Some Slavic pagan rock and folk rock bands have songs about Koliada:

- Song of the Ukrainian black metal band Nokturnal Mortum called Kolyada
- Song of the Russian folk band Ivan Kupala, called Kolyada
- Song of the Russian pagan metal band Arkona, called Kolyada
- Song of the Belarusian pagan metal band Kolo Pravi - Goy Kolyada
- Song Kolyada of the Russian band Veter vody
- Song Kolyada of the Ukrainian female singer Iryna Fedyshyn
- Song Kolyada my of the Ukrainian female singer Iryna Fedyshyn
- Song Kolyada-kolyadka of the Ukrainian female singer Iryna Dolya

== See also ==
- Slavic deities
- Slavic mythology
- Koledari
- Ded Moroz
