= Interpretatio slavica =

Interpretatio slavica is the practice by the Slavic peoples to identify the gods of neighboring peoples and the names of Christian saints with the names of Slavic deities.

== Identification with related pagan deities ==
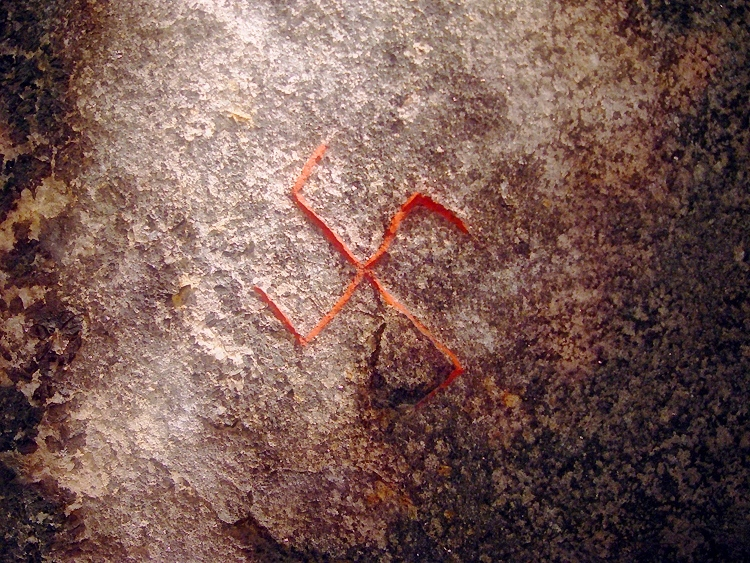
Detail of swastika on the 9th century Snoldelev Stone

- Perun is a god of thunder, in functions very similar to the Germanic-Scandinavian Thor, the Baltic Perkūnas and Karelian-Finnish Ukko (the latter is of Baltic origin). Both in Germanic and in Finnish mythologies, "hatchets" were also an attribute of the Thunderer. It is noteworthy that both Thor and Perun were often linked by the symbol "yarga" (the Slavic name for the four-pointed swastika), recorded by Hilda Davidson. To the Vikings the swastika could have come from the Goths or through the Baltic medium.
- Stribog — resembles Latvian Žaltys, Indian god of chaos Vritra (it is noteworthy that both deities are represented in the form of chronic snake like entities or ordinary snakes). The Slavic word stryj is derived from Proto-Indo-European *stru-io- and is cognate with Lithuanian: strujus "uncle, old man" and Old Irish: sruith "old, honorable"
- Veles — considered a variant of Velnias and Germanic Frey. From the treaties of Russia with Byzantium, it is known that for the Varangian-Rus in the squad of Igor, Perun and Veles were "their own gods". It is likely that these two deities replaced the Scandinavians with their Thor and Freyr, similar in function to the Slavic deities.
- Simargl — according to some scientists, it is an analog of the Iranian Simurgh, although today it is widely believed that the name Simargl is a distorted phrase of "sema yerila". Some researchers draw attention to the similarities between the Simargl and the fire dog Sköll, who represents the sun. The legend of eating the sun is also present from Baltic mythology.
- Diu is a variant of the name of the ancient Zeus in the Old Russian teachings against paganism. The Russian version of the name "Zeus", according to one of the hypotheses, formed from its basis Diw.
- Mokosh is an analogue of the Finno-Ugric Moksha. According to Boris Rybakov, the name of the Finnish people of the Mokshas originated from the latter.

== Identification with Christian saints ==
- Elijah the Prophet — after the baptism of Russia, he replaced Perun
- Paraskeva Friday — gradually replaced Mokosh
- Saint Blaise — replaced Volos (not to be confused with Veles, the god of wisdom and knowledge)

== Identification with Christian holidays ==
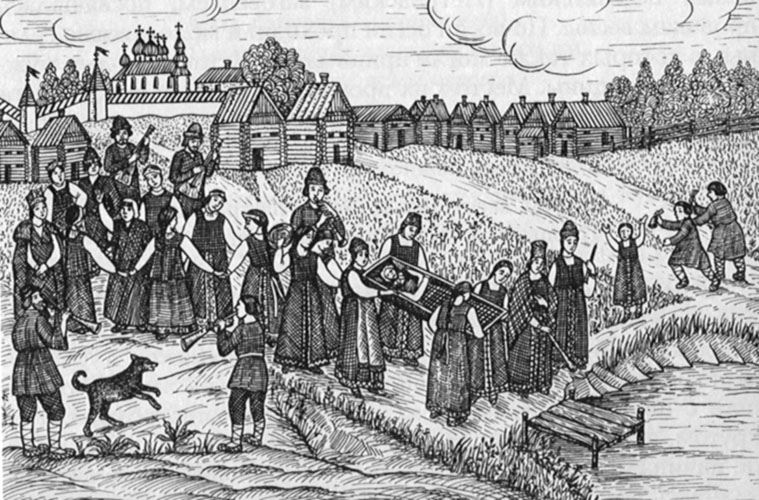
Funeral of Kostroma. Drawing from lubok. 19th century

According to a number of scientists, some native Slavic deities can be reconstructed by the names of religious (Christian) holidays which have features of paganism. Such holidays include:

- Maslenitsa
- Jarilo
- Kostroma
- Kostrubonka
- Koliada
- Kupala

According to Vladimir Toporov, it is impossible to reconstruct the Slavic gods from the names of rites and holidays, and even more so their functions.
