= Textual variants in the Primary Chronicle =

Differences in Primary Chronicle manuscripts

Textual variants in the Primary Chronicle manuscripts of the Kievan Rus' arise when a copyist makes deliberate or inadvertent alterations to the text that is being reproduced. Textual criticism (or textology) of the Primary Chronicle or Tale of Bygone Years (Old East Slavic: Повѣсть времѧньныхъ лѣтъ, romanized: Pověstĭ vremęnĭnyxŭ lětŭ, (Note: Belarusian: Аповесць мінулых часоў, romanized: Apoviesć minulych časoŭ; Russian: Повесть временных лет, romanized: Povest' vremennykh let; Ukrainian: Повість минулих літ, romanized: Povist' mynulykh lit) commonly abbreviated PVL) has included study of its textual variants.

== Legend ==
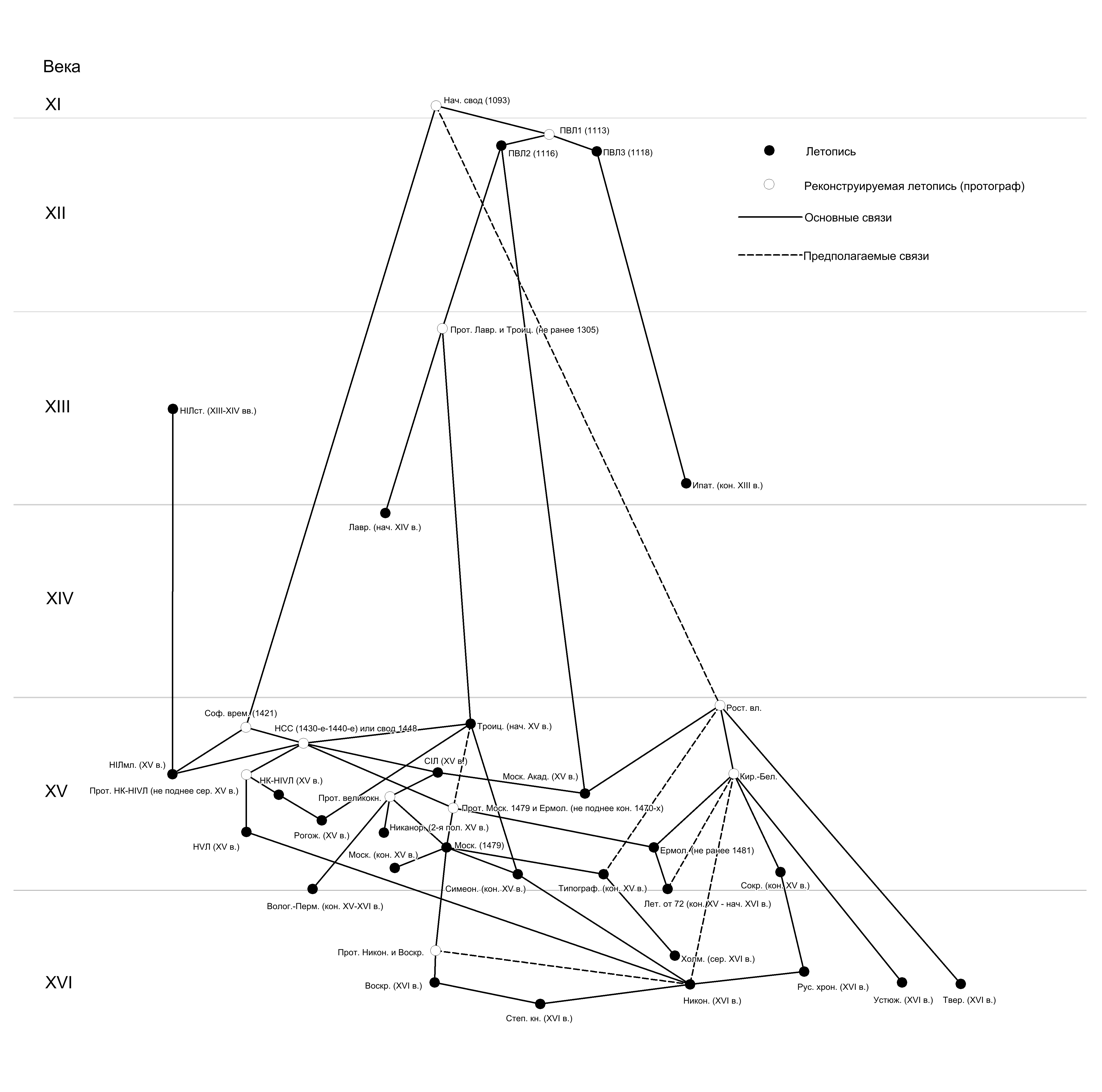
Genealogical scheme of the main Rus' chronicles (Shakhmatov, Lur'e, Likhachev)

Frequently used sigla (scribal symbols and abbreviations) of Primary Chronicle manuscripts and editions include:

Six main manuscripts
English name	Lat	Abr	Cyr	Slavic names	Digital versions
Academic Chronicle	A	Aka	А	Russian: Академическая летопись, romanized: Akademicheskaya letopis' Ukrainian: Академічний літопис, romanized: Akademichnyj litópys	manuscript scan
Hypatian Codex	H	Ipa; Ipat	И	Russian: Ипатьевская летопись, romanized: Ipat'evskaya letopis' Ukrainian: Іпатіївський літопис, romanized: Ipátijivśkyj litópys	manuscript scan
Khlebnikov Codex; Xlebnikov Codex	Kh; X	Xle	Х	Russian: Хлебниковский список, romanized: Hlebnikovskij spisok Ukrainian: Хлєбниковський список, romanized: Khljebnykovśkyj spysok	manuscript scan
Laurentian Codex	L	Lav	Л	Russian: Лаврентьевский список, romanized: Lavrent'evskij spisok Ukrainian: Лаврентіївський список, romanized: Lavrentijivśkyj spysok	manuscript scan
Radziwiłł Chronicle	R	Rad	Р	Russian: Радзивилловская летопись, romanized: Radzivillovskaya letopis' Ukrainian: Радзивіллівський літопис, romanized: Radzyvíllivśkyj litópys	manuscript scan
Trinity Chronicle	TL	Tro	Т	Russian: Троицкая летопись, romanized: Troitskaya letopis' Ukrainian: Троїцький літопис, romanized: Trojitśkyj litópys	(manuscript lost)

Laurentian Codex
(click for full PDF)

Hypatian Codex
(click for full PDF)

Radziwiłł Chronicle
(click for full PDF)

Academic Chronicle
(click for full PDF)

Khlebnikov Codex
(click for full PDF)

Synodal Scroll or Older Redaction of the Novgorod First Chronicle (click for full PDF)

Novgorod First Chronicle manuscripts
English name	Lat	Abr	Cyr	Slavic names
Novgorod First Chronicle	NPL; N1L	Novg. I НIЛ	НПЛ; Н1Л	Russian: Новгородская первая летопись, romanized: Novgoródskaya pérvaya létopisʹ Ukrainian: Новгородський перший літопис, romanized: Novhorodśkyj pershyj litópys
Synod Scroll; Older Redaction			НПЛст	Russian: Синодальный список, romanized: Sinodálʹnyy spispok Russian: Старший извод, romanized: Starshij izvod
Novgorod First Chronicle of the Younger Redaction	NPLml		НПЛмл	Russian: Новгородская первая летопись Младшего Извода, romanized: Novgoródskaya pérvaya létopis' Mladshego Izvoda
Commission Scroll	K	Kom	К	Kommissionyi
Academy Scroll	Ak	NAca	НАк	Akademichenskyi
Tolstoi Scroll	T	Tol; Tols	Тол	Tolstovoi

Critical editions

- Complete Collection of Russian Chronicles: PSRL
- Aleksey Shakhmatov: Šax
- A. F. Bychkov 1872: Byč
- Dmitry Likhachev: Lix
- Donald Ostrowski et al. Paradosis (2003, digitised 2014): α
- L. Müller (2001) critical modern German translation
1872 critical edition
of the Laurentian Codex
(click for full PDF)

1843 critical edition
of the Hypatian Codex
(click for full PDF)

1950 critical edition
of the NPL
(click for full PDF)

1914 English translation
of the NPL
(click for full PDF)

== List ==
Note: Unlike the chapters and verses of the Bible used in biblical studies, textual criticism of the Primary Chronicle (PVL) employs notation by page and line. (Note: "Examples are quoted here as they appear in the Laurentian manuscript and are taken from the 1950 Academy of Sciences edition of the Povest' vremennyx let. Numbers in parentheses indicate the location (page and line number) of each example in Volume I of the Academy of Sciences edition.") For example, a notation such as "3.2" refers to the "third (3rd) page, second (2nd) line".

=== 0 ===
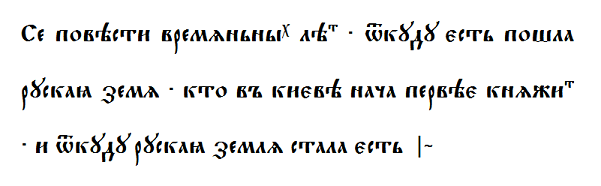
Opening line of the PVL according to the Laurentian Codex (Lav) of 1377

0.1

Се повѣсти времѧньных лѣт., Se pověstĭ vremęnĭnyx lět, 'These are the tales of bygone years.' – Lav Tro Byč Šax Lix
повесть временных лѣтъ черноризца феѡдось|ева, pověstĭ vremennyx lětŭ čĭrnorizĭtsa Feodosieva, 'Tale of bygone years by the monk of Theodosius' – Rad Aka Ipa α
Пѡвѣсти врѣменных лѣт. нестера черноризца.| федѡосїева , pověstĭ vremennyx lět. nestera čĭrnorizĭtsa Fedōsïeva, 'Tale of bygone years by the nestera (Note: Some readers have taken the word нестера to refer to Nestor the Chronicler, but Ostrowski (1981) pointed out: 'The word нестера was added in [the Khlebnikov Codex], and thus cannot be used as evidence for the name of the compiler of the PVL.') monk of Theodosius' – Xle
Временникъ, еже есть нарицается лѣтописание, Vremennikŭ, ezhe estĭ naritsaetsya lětopisanie, 'Bygone years, which is the name of the chronicle' – Novgorod First Chronicle Younger Redaction

0.2

манастыря печерьскаго,, manastyrja pečerĭskago,, 'from the Monastery of Pechersk (the Caves),' – Rad Aka Ipa Xle α
omitted – Lav Tro Byč Šax Lix

0.2–3

ѿкуду есть пошла рускаꙗ земѧ. кто въ киевѣ нача первѣе кнѧ<жит>, 'regarding the origin of the land of Rus', the first princes of Kiev' – Lav
князеи и земля Руския, knyazej i zemlya Ruskiya, 'about the Rus' princes and land.' – Novgorod First Chronicle Younger Redaction

0.3

киевѣ нача, Kievě nacha, 'of Kiev began' – Lav Byč Šax Lix
и како избра богъ страну нашу на послЂднЂе время, и грады почаша бывати по мЂстом, преже Новгородчкая Б волость и потом Кыевская, и о поставлении Киева, како во В имя назвася В Кыевъ., 'and how God chose our country for the last time, and the cities began to be in their places, first in the Novgorodian volost and then the Kyevan, and of the rise of Kiev, which was called by the name of Kyevû.' – Novgorod First Chronicle Younger Redaction
omitted – all other manuscripts, α

=== 1 ===
1.1

се начнемъ повѣсть сию., se načnemŭ pověstĭ siju., 'let us begin this story.' – Lav Tro Aka Ipa Byč Lix α
Се начнемъ повѣсть сїю., Se načnemŭ pověstĭ sīju., 'Let us begin this story.' – Xle
се начн^{м}е повѣсть сию., Se načn^{m}e pověstĭ siju., 'Let us [begin] this story.' – Rad
Се начьнѣмъ повѣсть сию., Se načĭněmŭ pověstĭ siju., 'Let us begin this story.' – Šax

1.2

трие сынове ноеви, trie synove noevi, 'the three sons of Noah' – Tro Byč Lix
.г҃.е сн҃ве ноеви, .g'.e s[y]nve noevi, 'the 3 s[o]ns of Noah' – Rad Aka α
бо .г҃.е сн҃ве ноеви, bo .g'.e s[y]nve noevi, 'for the 3 s[o]ns of Noah' – Ipa
оубо трїе с҃нове ноеви, ubo trīe s[y]nove Noevi, 'for the three sons of Noah' – Xle
убо трие сынове Ноеви, ubo trie synove Noevi, 'for the three sons of Noah' – Šax
первие с<нве> ноеви, pervie s<ive> noevi, '(the) first s[ons] of Noah' – Lav

1.3

симъ. хамъ. афетъ., simŭ. xamŭ. afetŭ., 'Simŭ, Xamŭ, Afetŭ.' – Lav Tro Ipa Byč Šax Lix α
с^{м}и. х^{м}а. афе^{т}, s^{m}i. x^{m}a. afe^{t}., 'Smi, Xma, Afet.' – Aka Rad (афетъ) Xle (и афе^{т})

1.9

елмаисъ. инди. равиꙗ. на всѧ., elmaisŭ, indi, rabija na vsja, 'Elmais, Indi[a], all of [A]rabia.' – Lav
елмаисъ инди аравия силная колия комагини финикия вся, elmaisŭ indi arabija silnaja kolija finikija vsja, 'Elmais Indi[a] Arabia the Strong Kolija Komagini all of Phinicia.' – Tro
елоумаисъ. инди. равиꙗ силнаа. коулїи. колгини. фикиа всѧ:-, elymaisŭ, indi, rabija silnaa, kulīi, kolgini, fikia vsja, 'Elymais, Indi[a], [A]rabia the Stron[g], Kulīi, Kolgini, all of Phicia.' – Rad Aka (3 ї/и variations)
елумаисъ. индиѧ. aравиа силнаꙗ. кулии. колгини. финикиꙗ всѧ, elymaisŭ, indija, arabija silnaja, kulii, kolgini, finikija vsja, 'Elymais, India, Arabia the Strong, Kulii, Kolgini, all of Phinicia.' – Ipa
елоумаись. индиѧ аравїа силнаа. коулии. комагины. финикїа всѧ., elymaisŭ, indija arabīa silnaa, kulii, komaginy, finikīa vsja, 'Elymais, India Arabia the Stron[g], Kulii, Komaginy, all of Phinicīa.' – Xle

=== 3 ===
3.8

илурикъ, ilurikŭ, 'Illyricum' – Rad Aka Ipa Xle Šax α
илюрикъ, iljurikŭ, 'Illyricum' – Lav Byč Lix
люрикъ, ljurikŭ, 'Illyricum' – Tro
Ἰλλυρίς, Illyrís, 'of Illyria' – George Hamartolos

See also Generations of Noah

3.8–3.9

Ἰλλυρίς, ἡ Λυχνίτις, Ἀδριανή, Illyrís, he Lychnítis, Adriané, 'of Illyria, Lychnitis, Adriane' – George Hamartolos
Илурикъ, Словѣне, Лухития, Анъдриакия, Ilurikŭ, Slověne, Luxnitija, Anŭdriakija, 'Illyricum, the Slavs, Lychnitia, Andriakia' – α

=== 4 ===
4.12

<св>еи. оурма<не> русь. агнѧне галичане, <sv>ei. urma<ne> rusĭ. agnjane galichane, '<Sw]edes, Urma<ne> Rus', Agnjane, Galichane' – Lav
свѣе урмане готе русь ангняне галичане, svěi urmane gote rusĭ angnjane galichane, 'Swedes Urmane Gote Rus' Angnjane Galichane' – Tro
всеи оурмане галичанѣ, vsei urmane galichaně, 'all Urmane Galichane' – Rad
свеи. оурмане. галичане., svei. urmane. galichane, 'Swedes, Urmane, Galichane' – Aka
свеи. оурмане. готѣ. русь. аглѧнѣ. галичанѣ., svei. urmane. gotě. rusĭ. agljaně. galichaně, 'Swedes, Urmane, Gote, Rus', Agljane, Galichane.' – Ipa
свеи, оурмане. гте роу^{c} а<глѧ>не, галичане., svei, urmane. gte rus a<glja>ne, galichane, 'Swedes, Urmane. G[o]te Rus A[glja]ne, Galichane.' – Xle

The Urmane are usually interpreted as "Normans" or "Norsemen"; Gote as either "Goths" or "Gotlanders"; A(n)gnjane or Agljane as "Angles" / "English"; and Galichane as either "Galicians" (and thus translated as "Spaniards", see Galicia (Spain)), "Gauls" or "Welsh".

4.13

волохове, voloxove, 'Vlachs or Italians' – Tro Ipa Xle Šax α
<волъ>хва, <volŭ>xva, 'Vlachs or Italians' – Lav Byč Lix
omitted – Rad Aka

It is unclear what Volokhove (or Volŭkhva) means. Cross & Sherbowitz-Wetzor (1930, 1953) translated it as "Italians" (compare modern Polish Włochy "Italy" or "Italians"); but in 6.6 he rendered Волохомъ/Волхомъ/Волотомъ as Vlakhs. Lunt (1995) described the Volokhs as 'people speaking Latin or a Romance language.' Thuis (2015) translated both as "Vlachs", adding 'This is possibly a Celto-Romance people.'

4.13

римляне, rimljane, 'Romans' – Tro Byč Šax Lix α; (римлѧне) Lav Xle; (римлѧнѣ) Ipa
omitted – Rad Aka

=== 5 ===
5.22

племени афетова. нар ци еже суть словѣне., plemeni afetova, nar tsi ezhe sutĭ slověne., 'the line of Afet, the Nartsi who are Slovenes.' – Lav Byč Lix
племени^{ж} афетова нарицаеми иновѣрци еже соуть словене, plemeni^{zh} afetova naritsaemi inověrtsi ezhe sutĭ slovene., 'the line of Afet, called the Inovertsi, who are Slovenes.' – Rad
племени же а҃фетова. нарицаемии норци еже сѹть словѣне., plemeni zhe ahfetova, naritsaemii nortsi ezhe sutĭ slověne., 'the line of Ahfet, called the Nortsi, who are Slovenes.' – Aka
племени же афетова. нарѣ<ц>аемѣи норци. иже сѹть словенѣ., plemeni zhe afetova, narě<ts>aeměi nortsi, izhe sutĭ sloveně., 'the line of Afet, called the Nortsi, who are Slovenes.' – Ipa

The N- ethnonym is unclear. Cross & Sherbowitz-Wetzor (1930, 1953) rendered them as the Noricians, who are identical to the Slavs. Lunt (1995), noting that Lav and Rad 'have independent corruptions', translated Ipa/Xle/Aka as (those) called Norci, who are Slavs. He commented: 'These clauses do not fit together easily. (...) This rather odd sentence seems, then, to imply that the Norci are a sub-tribe of Slavs.' Thuis (2015) wrote the Noriks, who are Slavs, adding 'The inhabitants of the Roman province of Noricum along the Danube. Possibly, this is a reference to the purported Urheimat of the Slavic people.'

5.23–25 See also Hungarian conquest of the Carpathian Basin § Second phase (900–902)

=== 6 ===
6.6–8 See also Hungarian conquest of the Carpathian Basin § Second phase (900–902)

6.13

деревлѧне, derevlęne, 'Derevlęne' – Rad Ipa Xle (деревлѧ)
Деревляне, Derevliane, 'Derevliane' – α
древлѧне, drevlęne, 'Drevlęne' – Lav Aka
Древляне, Drevliane, 'Drevliane' – Byč Šax Lix

=== 7 ===
7.21–22

в понтеское море треми жерелы., v ponteskoe more tremi zherely., 'into the Pontesk Sea through three mouths' – Ipa (жералы) Xle
в поньтьское море треми жерелы., v ponĭtĭskoe more tremi zherely., 'into the Ponĭtĭsk Sea through three mouths' – Rad Aka (понтьское)
в Поньтьское море трьми жерелы,, v Ponĭtĭskoe more trĭmi zherely., 'into the Ponĭtĭsk Sea through three mouths' – α Šax (понтьское)
в понетьское море жереломъ., v ponetĭskoe more zherelomŭ, 'into the Ponetsk Sea through mouths' – Lav Byč Lix

=== 8 ===
7.21–9.4 Journey of Andrew the Apostle along the Dnieper from Korsun via the future site of Kyiv towards the future site of Veliky Novgorod.

=== 9–10 ===
9.5–10.16

9.5–21 The legendary founding of Kiev (Kyiv)

9.17

киевъ, kievŭ, 'Kiev' – Lav Tro Rad Ipa Byč Lix
кыевь, kyevŭ, 'Kyev' – Aka Xle Šax α

9.26–10.16 The acts of Kyi, and the death of the four siblings.

10.5

приходившю ему ко цр҃ю. ꙗко|же сказають. – Lav
приходившю ему и ко царю якоже сказають – Tro
приходившю ему ко царю, якоже сказають, – Byč
приходившю ему ко царю, якоже сказають, – Lix
проходившю емоу ко цр҃ю не свѣмы.|но токмо ѡ сем вѣмы. ꙗкож сказоують. – Rad
пришедшѹ емѹ | къ цр҃ю не свѣмы. но токмо ѡ семь вѣмы. ꙗкоже | сказѹютъ. – Aka
приходившю ему къ с | црсю | не свѣмы. но токмо ѡ се|мъ вѣмы ꙗкоже сказаю|ть. – Ipa
прихдовїшю емоу къ цр҃ю, не свѣмы [lacuna] – Xle
приходивъшю ему къ цѣсарю, которого не съвѣмы, нъ тъкъмо о семь вѣмы, якоже съказають, – Šax
приходивъшю ему къ цьсарю, не съвѣмы, нъ тъкъмо о семь вѣмы, якоже съказають, – α

=== 12 ===
12.16

деревлѧне, derevlęne, 'Derevlęne' – Rad Aka Ipa
Деревляне, Derevliane, 'Derevliane' – Byč Lix α
древѧнѧ, drevlęnę, 'Drevlęnę' – Lav
древяня, drevliania, 'Drevliania' – Tro
Древляне, Drevliane, 'Drevliane' – Šax
[lacuna] – Xle

=== 16 ===
16.21–17.3

=== 17 ===
17.4–24 Prediction of Khazar downfall.

17.25–29 See also Primary Chronicle § Opening date error.

=== 19–20 ===
Act	Novgorod First Chronicle (NPL)		Laurentian Codex (Lav)		Hypatian Codex (Ipa, Ipat)		Radziwiłł Chronicle (Rad)	
	Church Slavonic	Modern English	Church Slavonic	Modern English	Church Slavonic	Modern English	Church Slavonic	Modern English
Revolt; 19:14–16	В лѣто 6362 (854) (...) И въсташа словенѣ и кривици и меря и чюдь на варягы, и изгнаша я за море; и начаша владѣти сами собѣ и городы ставити.	In the year 6362 (854) (...) And the Slovenes and Krivitsi and Merya and Chudĭ rose against the Varangians and expelled them beyond the sea; and they began to rule themselves and set up cities.	Въ лето 6369. Изъгнаша варяги за море, и не даша имъ дани, и почаша сами в собе володети.	6368–6370 (860–862). The tributaries of the Varangians drove them back beyond the sea and, refusing them further tribute, set out to govern themselves.	В лѣто [6370 (862)] И изгнаша Варѧгы за море, и не даша имъ дани. Н почаша сами в собѣ володѣти.	In the year [6370 (862)] And they expelled the Varangians across the sea, and gave them no tribute, and they themselves became masters.	В лѣт. ҂ѕ҃.т҃.о҃. Бы[г]ша варѧгы за морь[ꙗ] и не да им дани. и почаша сами в собѣ володѣти.	In the year 6370, [they] exiled the Varangians beyond the sea and gave them no tribute. And they themselves became masters of their own affairs.
Conflict; 19:16–18	И въсташа сами на ся воеватъ, и бысть межи ими рать велика и усобица, и въсташа град на град, и не бѣше в нихъ правды.	And they arose to fight with themselves, and there was great strife and discord between them, and they rose up city upon city, and there was no righteousness among them.	И не бе в нихъ пра вды, и въста родъ на родъ, быша в них усобице, и во евати почаша сами на ся.	There was no law among them, but tribe rose against tribe. Discord thus ensued among them, and they began to war one against another.	и не бѣ в нихъ правды, и въста родъ на род, и быша оусобицѣ в них, и воєвати сами на сѧ почаша.	And they had no righteousness, and clan stood up against clan, and they were plagued by strife within them, and they began to fight against each other.	и не бѣ в них правды. и восташа род на род. и быша в них оусобици. воевати по <...>	And there was no righteousness among them. And they rose up clan against clan. And there were wars among them <...>.
Agreement; 19:18–20	И рѣша к себѣ: «князя поищемъ, иже бы владѣлъ нами и рядилъ ны по праву».	And they resolved to themselves: "Let us look for a prince who would rule over us and reward us according to our rights."	Реша сами в себе: «По ищемъ собе князя, иже бы володелъ нами и су дилъ по праву».	They said to themselves, "Let us seek a prince who may rule over us and judge us according to the Law."	И ркоша: «поищемъ сами в собѣ кнѧзѧ, иже бы володѣлъ нами и рѧдилъ по рѧду, по праву».	And they said: "Let us look for a prince for ourselves, who would command us and rule according to order, according to the law."	<...> зѧ. иже бы <в...> рѧдилъ по правоу	<...>ce, who would <r...> according to the law."
Journey & ethnonym 19:20–24	Идоша за море к варягомъ	They went over the sea to the Varangians	Идоша за море къ варягомъ, к руси. Сице бо ся зваху тьи варязи суть, яко се друзии зо вутся свие, друзии же урмане, анъгляне, друзи и гъте, тако и си.	They accordingly went overseas to the Varangian Rus': these particular Varangians were known as Rus', just as some are called Swedes, and others Normans, English, and Gotlanders, for they were thus named.	идоша за море к Варѧгом. к Руси; сіце бо звахуть ты Варѧгы Русь, ӕко се друзии зовутсѧ Свеє, друзии же Оурмани, Аньглѧне, инѣи и Готе, тако и си.	They went across the sea to the Varangians, to the Rus'; for this reason thou shalt call the Varangians the Rus', as the others are called Svej [Swedes], and the others Ourmany [Normans?], Anĭgliane [Angles], and still others Gote [Goths/Gotlanders?], so they are.	и идоша за море к варѧго<м> к ру<с> сице бо тїи звахоус варѧзи роус ꙗко се дроузии зовоутьс свие дроузииж оуръмѧни. инъглѧне. дроузии и готе. тако и си	And they went across the sea to the Varangian[s], to the Ru[s]; for these Varangians were called Rus, as others are called Svye (Swedes), and others Urŭmiany [Normans?], Ynŭgliane [Angles], and others Gote [Goths/Gotlanders?], so they are.
Invitation; 19:24–20:3	и ркоша: «земля наша велика и обилна, а наряда у нас нѣту; да поидѣте к намъ княжить и владѣть нами».	and said: "Our land is great and plenty, but we have no order; so come to us to reign and rule us."	Реша русь, чюдь, словени, и кри вичи, вся: «Земля наша велика и обилна, а наря да в ней нетъ. Да поидете княжитъ и володети на ми».	The Chuds, the Slavs, the Krivichians, and the Ves' then said to the people of Rus', "Our land is great and rich, but there is no order in it. Come to rule and reign over us."	Ркоша Русь, Чюдь, Словенѣ, Кривичи, и всѧ: «Землѧ наша велика и ѡбилна а нарѧда въ неи нѣтъ. да поидете кнѧжит̑ и володѣть нами».	The Rus', Chudĭ, Slovenes, Krivichi and Ves' said: "Our land is great and rich, but there is no order in it. So go reign and rule over us and judge."	рѣша роуси. чюд. и словене. и кривичи. и вси. землѧ наша велика и ѡбилна. а нарѧда в неи нѣтъ. да поидѣте оу нас кн҃жити. и володѣти:-	The Rus', Chud, Slovenes, Krivichi and Ves' said: "Our land is great and rich, but there is no order in it. So come and reign and govern over us."
Arrival; 20:3–11	Изъбрашася 3 брата с роды своими, и пояша со собою дружину многу и предивну, и приидоша к Новугороду. И сѣде старѣишии в Новѣгородѣ, бѣ имя ему Рюрикъ; а другыи сѣде на Бѣлѣозерѣ, Синеусъ; а третеи въ Изборьскѣ, имя ему Труворъ. И от тѣх варягъ, находникъ тѣхъ, прозвашася Русь, и от тѣх словет Руская земля; и суть новгородстии людие до днешняго дни от рода варяжьска.	Three brothers took off with their clans, and they brought a great and foremost army with them, and came to Novѣgorodѣ. And the eldest sits in Novѣgorodѣ, his name is Ryurikŭ; the second sits on Bѣlѣozesѣ [Bele-Ozero, "White Lake"], Syneusŭ; and the third sits in Izbor'skѣ, his name is Truvorŭ. And from those Varangians, the finders of those things, were nicknamed Rus', and from those things came the Rus' land; and the people of Novgorod are from the Varangians until this day.	И изъбрашася 3 братья с роды своими, по яша по собе всю русь, и придоша: старейший Рю рикъ, а другий - Синеусъ на Беле-озере, а третий Изборьсте Труворъ. От техъ прозвася Руская зе мля, новугородьци, ти суть людье ноугородьци от рода варяжьска. Преже бо беша словени.	They thus selected three brothers, with their kinsfolk, who took with them all the Rus' and migrated. The oldest, Rurik, located himself in Novgorod; the second, Sineus, at Beloozero; and the third, Truvor, in Izborsk. On account of these Varangians, the district of Novgorod became known as the land of Rus'. The present inhabitants of Novgorod are descended from the Varangian race, but aforetime they were Slavs.	и изъбрашасѧ триє брата с роды своими, и поӕша по собѣ всю Русь и придоша къ Словѣномъ пѣрвѣє, и срубиша город̑ Ладогу. и сѣде старѣишии в Ладозѣ Рюрикъ, а другии Синєоусъ на Бѣлѣѡзерѣ, а третѣи Труворъ въ Изборьсцѣ. и ѿ тѣхъ Варѧгъ прозвасѧ Рускаӕ землѧ.	And having chosen three brothers from their people, they took with them all the Russes and came first to the Slavs (Slovenes), and they built the city of Ladoga. Ryurikŭ, the eldest, settled in Ladoga [Ladozě], Sineusŭ, the second, at Bělěōzerě ["White Lake"], and Truvorŭ, the third, in Izborsk [Izborǐstsě]. From these Varangians the land of Rus' received its name.	И избрашас .г҃. е братѧ. з роды своими. и поꙗша собѣ всю роу. и приидоша к словеном первое. и сроубиша город ладогоу. и сѣде в ладозѣ стареи рюрикъ. а дрѹгии с<и>де оу нас на белѣѡзере. а третии трѹворъ въ изборьскѹ. и ѡ тѣх вѧрѧгъ. прозвасѧ роускаа землѧ новгород тїи сѹт люде новгородци ѿ род варежска преж бо бѣ	And having chosen three brothers from their people, they took with them all the Rus' and came first to the Slovenes. And they built the city of Ladoga. And the oldest, Ryurikŭ, settled in Ladoga [Ladozě]. And the second/other settled with us at Bеlěōzere ["White Lake"]. And the third, Truvorŭ, in Izborǐsku. From these Varangians the land of Rus' received its name. Novgorod and the essence of the Novgorodians were from the Varangian clan before that.
Deaths; 20:11–19	По двою же лѣту умрѣ Синеусъ и брат его Труворъ, и прия власть единъ Рюрикъ, обою брату власть, и нача владѣти единъ.	Two years later Sineusŭ and his brother Truvorŭ died, and only Ryurikŭ took power, the authority of both his brothers, and he began to reign alone.	По дву же лету Синеусъ умре и братъ его Труворъ. И прия власть Рюрикъ, и раздая мужемъ свои мъ грады: овому Полотескъ, овому Ростовъ, дру гому Белоозеро. И по темъ городомъ суть находни ци варязи; перьвии насельници в Новегороде словене, Полотьски кривичи, в Ростове меря, в Беле-озере весь, в Муроме мурома. И теми всеми обладаше Рюрикъ.	After two years, Sineus and his brother Truvor died, and Rurik assumed the sole authority. He assigned cities to his followers, Polotsk to one, Rostov to another, and to another Beloozero. In these cities there are thus Varangian colonists, but the first settlers were, in Novgorod, Slavs; in Polotsk, Krivichians; at Beloozero, Ves', in Rostov, Merians; and in Murom, Muromians. Rurik had dominion over all these districts.	По дъвою же лѣту оумре Синеоусъ и братъ єго Труворъ, и приӕ Рюрикъ власть всю ѡдинъ. и пришед' къ Ильмєрю и сруби город' надъ Волховом', и прозваша и Новъгород' и сѣде ту кнѧжа', и раздаӕ мужемъ своимъ волости, и городы рубити, ѡвому Полътескъ, ѡвому Ростовъ, другому Бѣлоѡзеро. И по тѣмь городомъ суть находницѣ Варѧзи; пѣрвии наслѣдници в Новѣгородѣ Словенѣ, и в Пол̑о̑тьскѣ Кривичи, Ростовѣ Мерѧне, Бѣлѣѡзерѣ Весь, Муромѣ Мурома. И тѣми всѣми ѡбладаше Рюрикъ.	After two years Sineusŭ died, as well as his brother Truvorŭ, and Ryurikŭ assumed the sole authority. He then came to the Ilĭmer and founded on the Volkhov a city, which they named Novûgorod', and he settled there as prince, assigning cities and towns to his men, Polŭteskŭ to the one, Rostově to the other, and Běloōzero to another. And Varangians were the finders of these towns; the original descendants in Nověgorodě were Sloveně, and in Polôtĭskě were Krivichi, Rostovŭ Meręne, Bělěōzerě Vesĭ, Muromě Muromians. And Ryurikŭ possessed all these things.	По двою же лѣтоу оумре синеоусъ. и братъ его трѹворъ. и приа всю власть рюрикъ ѡдинъ. и пришед ко илмерю. и сроуби городкъ над волховом. и прозва новъгород. и сѣде тоу кн҃жа. раздаа волости. моужемъ своим. и городы роубити. ѡвомѹ полтескъ. ѡвомоу ростовъ. дроугомѹ бѣлоѡзеро. и по тѣмъ городомъ нахо дници соуть варѧзи. а первии насельници в новѣгород словени. в полоцкѹ кривичи. в ростове мерѧне. в белѣѡзере вес. в муромѣ мурома. и тѣми всѣми ѡбладаше рюрикъ.	After two years Sineusŭ died, as well as his brother Truvorŭ, and Ryurikŭ assumed the sole authority. He then came to the Ilĭmer and founded on the Volkhov a city, which they named Novŭgorod, and he settled there as prince, assigning cities to his men, Polteskŭ to the one, Rostovŭ to the other, and Běloōzero to another. And in those cities there were Varangians. And the first inhabitants of Novŭgorod were Slovenes. In Polotsku, there were Krivichi. In Rostove, there were Meręne. In Belěōzero, there were Ves. In Muromŭ, there were Muromians. And all of them were ruled by Ryurikŭ.
(Next)	(Text continues with a story about Igor and Oleg's campaign against Kiev, modern Kyiv).		(Text continues with a story about the reign of Askold and Dir in Kiev, modern Kyiv).		(Text continues with a story about the reign of Askold and Dir in Kiev, modern Kyiv).			

=== 25 ===
25.10–21 See also Hungarian conquest of the Carpathian Basin § Second phase (900–902)

=== 26 ===
26.21

ко ѡлго|[ви] гл҃ѧ, ko Ōlgo[vi] glę, 'Oleg' – Lav
ко лвови гл҃ѧ, ko Lvovi glę, 'Leo' – Rad, Aka,
къ лвови гл҃ѧ, kŭ Lvovi glę, 'Leo' – Ipa, Xle,

=== 41 ===
41.13 reference to Acts 19:13–14.

=== 54.12b–55.9 ===
The death of Igor of Kiev.

=== 55.10–60.8 ===
Olga's revenge on the Derevlians. See also Olga of Kiev § Drevlian Uprising.

55.10

вольга, vōlǐga, 'Vōlǐga' – Lav, Byč, Lix
ольга, ōlǐga, 'Ōlǐga' – Tolstoy, Šax, α
ѡльга, ōlǐga, 'Ōlǐga' – Ipa
ѡлга, ōlga, 'Ōlga' – Rad, Xle
олга, olga, 'Olga' – Aka, Kom

55.22

никифоровъ, nikiforovŭ, 'Nikiforov' – Ipa, Byč, Šax, Lix, α
никифоровь, nikiforovǐ, 'Nikiforov' – Aka
микифоровъ, mikiforovŭ, 'Mikiforov' – Kom, Tolstoy
микифорѡ^{в}, mikiforōv, 'Mikiforōv' – Xle
ники^{ѳ}ровъ, nikithrovŭ, 'Nikithrov' – Rad
нифовъ., nifovŭ, 'Nifov' – Lav

55.23

идѣже ^{с} е^{с} н҃нѣ дворъ воротиславль и, 'where in there is now[adays] the courtyard of Vorotislavl' and' – Rad (воротиславль. и), Xle(идеже)
идѣже есть н҃нѣ дворъ воротиславль. и, 'where there is now[adays] the courtyard of Vorotislavl'. And' – Aka
идеже есть нынѣ двор^{ъ} воротиславль и, 'where there is nowadays the courtyard of Vorotislavl' and' – Ipa
есть, 'there is' – Lav
идеже есть нынѣ дворъ Воротиславль и, 'where there is nowadays the courtyard of Vorotislavl' and' – Byč, Šax, Lix
иде же есть нынѣ дворъ Воротиславль и, 'There is also nowadays the courtyard of Vorotislavl' and' – α

55.24

omitted – Lav
чюдинь, а перевѣсище бѣ внѣ града., chjudinĭ, a perevěsishte bě vŭně grada., 'Chudin, and [the] hunting ground / bird trap was outside [the] city' – Rad (гра^{д}.), Aka (ч^{д}ю^{и}нь.), Ipa (города), Xle (перевѣсишто; города.), Byč (Чюдинъ), Šax (вънѣ), Lix (Чюдинъ), α (вънѣ)

55.25

дворъ другыи, идеже есть дворъ Деместниковъ, 'another courtyard, where [the] courtyard of Demestnikov is' – Rad, Aka, α
дворъ другый идѣже есть дворъ Демьстиковъ, 'another courtyard where [the] courtyard of Demestikov is' – Byč, Šax, Lix
дворъ другыи, 'another courtyard' – Kom, Tolstoy (другии)
дворъ теремныи. и другыи идеже е^{с} дворъ демесниковъ, '[a] terem courtyard and another, where [the] courtyard of Demes(t)nikov is' – Ipa (демесниковъ), Xle (деместниковь)
дворъ демьст^{и}ковъ., '[the] courtyard of Demestikov' – Lav

Cross & Sherbowitz-Wetzor (1953): 'another palace, where the palace of the Cantors is now situated'.

56.1

дерьвьска землѧ, derĭvǐska zemlẹ – Lav
деревлѧньскаа землꙗ, derevlẹnǐskaa zemlja – Rad
деревѧньскаа землѧ, derevẹnǐskaa zemlẹ – Aka
деревьск^{а}ꙗ землѧ, derevǐskaja zemlẹ – Ipa
деревскаа землѧ, derevskaa zemlẹ – Xle
деревьскаꙗ землꙗ, derevĭskaja zemlja – Kom Tolstoy (деревъскаꙗ)
Дерьвьска земля, Derĭvǐska zemlia – Byč, Šax (Деревьска), Lix
Деревьская земля, Derevǐskaia zemlia – α

=== 60–62 ===
60.25–62.8 Olga's visit to Tsargrad (Constantinople), and conversion to Byzantine Christianity. See also Olga of Kiev § Conversion.

60.26

бѣ тогда ц҃рь имѧнемь цѣмьскии., 'There was then a tsarĭ named Tsěmĭskii.' – Lav
и бѣ тогда ц҃рь костѧнтинъ с҃нъ леѡновъ., 'And there was then a tsarĭ Kostyantinŭ son of Leōnovŭ.' – Rad
и бѣ тогда ц҃рь костѧнтинь с҃нъ леѡновь., 'And there was then a tsarĭ Kostyantinĭ son of Leōnovĭ.' – Aka
и бѣ тогда црсь костѧнтинъ. с҃нъ леѡнтовъ., 'And there was then a tsrsĭ Kostyantinŭ, son of Leōntovŭ.' – Ipa
и бѣ тогда ц҃рь костѧнтин. с҃нь леоновь., 'And there was then a tsarĭ Kostyantin, son of Leonovĭ.' – Xle
и бѣ тогда цесарь именемь чемьскыи они, 'And there was then a tsesarĭ named Chemĭskȳi they' – Kom
и бѣ тогда цесарь именемь чемьскии, 'And there was then a tsesarĭ named Chemĭskii' – NAk Tol

Ostrowski (2007): 'Since the emperor at the time was not Tsimiskes but Constantine, the reading Костянтинъ сынъ Леоновъ might be considered a correction of the primary but historically incorrect reading.'

61.21b–22

и ре^{ч} црь п^{е}реклюкала мѧ еси ольга. и дасть еи, i rech tsrĭ perekljukala mę esi olĭga. i dastĭ ei, 'And [the] tsar said: '[You] have fooled me, Olga [nominative].' And [he] gives her' – Lav
и ре^{ч} переклюкала мѧ еси олго. и вдасть еи, i rech perekljukala mę esi olgo. i vdastĭ ei, 'And [he] said: '[You] have fooled me, Olga [vocative].' And [he] gave her' – Rad
и рече переклюкала мѧ еси олго. и вдасть еи, i reche perekljukala mę esi olgo. i vdastĭ ei, 'And [he] said: '[You] have fooled me, Olga [vocative].' And [he] gave her' – Aka
и ре^{ч} ц^{с}рь переклюка мѧ олга. и вдасть еи, i reche tssrĭ perekljuka mę olga. i vdastĭ ei, 'And [the] tsar said: 'Olga [nominative] has fool[ed] me.' And [he] gave her' – Ipa
и ре^{ч} црь переклюка мѧ олга. и вдасть еи, i rech tsrĭ perekljuka mę olga. i, 'And [the] tsar said: 'Olga [nominative] has fool[ed] me.' And [he] gave her' – Ipa
и рече цесарь прѣдстоꙗщимъ ту велможамъ своимъ упремудри мꙗ олга словесы своими бѣ же она мудра словесы цесарь же пакы чемьскыи слышавши глаголы еꙗ дасть еи, 'And the Tsesar said to his nobles [standing] before him: 'Olga [nominative] has outsmarted me with her words.' For she was wise in words. And the Tsesar, having heard her words, then gave her' – Kom

Butler (2008): '[Ostrowski et al. (2003)], lines 61,22, omits "esi" after "Perekliukala" (sometimes with vocative "Ol'go"), which causes some manuscripts to read, "You have fooled, me, Ol'ga."'

62.8–25 Epilogue to Olga's conversion

62.14–18 biblical quotation Proverbs 1:20–22

Премудрость на исходищихъ поеть ся, на путьхъ же дьрзновение водить. На краихъ же забральныхъ проповѣдаеть ся, въ вратѣхъ же градьныхъ дьрзающи глаголеть. Елико бо лѣтъ незълобивии дьржать ся по правьду, 'Wisdom is celebrated in places of concourse, she lifteth up her voice in the streets; she crieth at the entrance to the walls, at the gates of cities she uttereth speech. For as many years as the just cleave to wisdom, they shall not be ashamed.' – α
עַד־מָתַ֣י ׀ פְּתָיִם֮ תְּֽאֵהֲב֫וּ פֶ֥תִי וְלֵצִ֗ים לָ֭צֹון חָמְד֣וּ לָהֶ֑ם וּ֝כְסִילִ֗ים יִשְׂנְאוּ־דָֽעַת׃ בְּרֹ֥אשׁ הֹמִיֹּ֗ות תִּ֫קְרָ֥א בְּפִתְחֵ֖י שְׁעָרִ֥ים בָּעִ֗יר אֲמָרֶ֥יהָ תֹאמֵֽר׃ חָ֭כְמֹות בַּח֣וּץ תָּרֹ֑נָּה בָּ֝רְחֹבֹ֗ות תִּתֵּ֥ן קֹולָֽהּ׃, 'Out in the open wisdom calls aloud, she raises her voice in the public square; at noisy street corners she cries out, at the city gate she makes her speech: “How long will you who are simple love your simple ways? How long will mockers delight in mockery and fools hate knowledge?"' – Proverbs 1:20–22 NIV

62.21–22 biblical quotation Proverbs 13:19

Желание благовѣрьныхъ наслажаеть душю, 'The accomplished desire of the faithful is sweet to the soul.' – α
תַּאֲוָ֣ה נִ֭הְיָה תֶעֱרַ֣ב לְנָ֑פֶשׁ וְתֹועֲבַ֥ת כְּ֝סִילִ֗ים ס֣וּר מֵרָֽע׃, 'A longing fulfilled is sweet to the soul, but fools detest turning from evil.' – Proverbs 13:19 NIV (KVJ: 'The desire accomplished is sweet to the soul: but it is abomination to fools to depart from evil.')

62.22–23 biblical quotation Proverbs 2:2

62.23–24 biblical quotation Proverbs 8:17

62.24–25 biblical quotation John 6:37

=== 63 ===
63.8–9 biblical quotation 1 Corinthians 1:18

Невѣрьнымъ бо вѣра хрьстияньска уродьство есть, 'For to the infidels, the Christian faith is foolishness.' – α
Ὁ λόγος γὰρ ὁ τοῦ σταυροῦ τοῖς μὲν ἀπολλυμένοις μωρία ἐστίν, 'For the message of the cross is foolishness to those who are perishing.' – 1 Corinthians 1:18 NIV

63.9–11 biblical quotation Psalm 82:5

Не съмыслиша бо, ни разумѣша въ тьмѣ ходящии, и не вѣдять славы Господьня., 'They do not comprehend it, because they walk in darkness and do not see the glory of God.' – α
לֹ֤א יָֽדְע֨וּ ׀ וְלֹ֥א יָבִ֗ינוּ בַּחֲשֵׁכָ֥ה יִתְהַלָּ֑כוּ יִ֝מֹּ֗וטוּ כָּל־מֹ֥וסְדֵי אָֽרֶץ׃, 'The 'gods' know nothing, they understand nothing. They walk about in darkness; all the foundations of the earth are shaken.' – Psalm 82:5 NIV

63.13–19 biblical quotation Proverbs 1:24–31 (or 1:25–30)

63.29–64.1 biblical quotation Exodus 21:17 (MT; LXX: Exodus 21:16). See also Textual variants in the Book of Exodus § Exodus 21.

Аще къто отьца или матере не послушаеть, съмьртию да умреть., Ashche kŭto otĭtsa ili matere ne poslushaetĭ, sŭmĭrtiyu da umretĭ., 'Whosoever heedeth not his father or his mother shall suffer death.' – α
וּמְקַלֵּ֥ל אָבִ֛יו וְאִמֹּ֖ו מֹ֥ות יוּמָֽת׃ ס, ū-mə-qal-lêl ’ā-ḇîw wə-’im-mōw mō-wṯ yū-māṯ. s, 'And he who curses his father or his mother surely shall be put to death.' – Exodus 21:17 NIV

Compare Deuteronomy 21:18–21.

=== 65–67 ===
65.14–18 Sviatoslav's invasion of Bulgaria (first part)

65.19–67.20 Siege of Kiev (968)

=== 69–73 ===
69–73 Sviatoslav's invasion of Bulgaria (second part)

=== 84–121 ===
84.18

бохъмичѣ, boxŭmichě, 'of Mohammedan (Islamic)' – Lav

111.23–24 (NPL 152.10–11)

на браченье., na brachenĭe, 'in(to) marriage' – Lav Byč Lix
на ѡброучание:-, na ōbrouchanie:-, 'in(to) betrothal' – Rad
на ѡбрѹченїе., na ōbruchenīe., 'in(to) betrothal' – Aka
на ѡбручение., na ōbruchenie., 'in(to) betrothal' – Ipa
на оброученїе., na obrouchenīe., 'in(to) betrothal' – Xle
на брачение, na brachenie, 'in(to) marriage' – Kom Tol Šax
на обручение., na obruchenie., 'in(to) betrothal' – α

Ostrowski (2007): 'Here the expected reading is 'marriage' (брачение) since Volodimir had already been 'betrothed' (обручение) to Anna earlier in the narrative.' Müller (2006) and Gippius (2002) argued that 'marriage' (брачение) was the primary reading, and that 'betrothal' (обручение) had to have been a later corruption in the protograph of Ipa and Kle, which had also contaminated Rad and Aka. Ostrowski countered that 'one may ask why the scribe of [Rad/Aka] would adopt a contextually incorrect reading from the contaminating source to replace a contextually correct reading in his direct source.' Following the lectio difficilior potior principle, Ostrowski asserted 'betrothed' (обручение) as the original text.

=== 122–125 ===
Volodimer' I defeated the Pechenegs on the river Trubizh, and alleged founded Belgorod (Bilhorod Kyivskyi) and Pereyaslavl' (Pereiaslav).

=== 132–134 ===
Killing of Boris and aftermath. See also Boris and Gleb.

132.29–133.3 biblical quotation Proverbs 1:16–19

“Скори суть пролияти кръвь бес правды. Събираютъ собѣ зълая ти бо обьщають ся кръви. Сихъ путие суть съконьчавающе безаконие, нечьстиемь бо свою душю емлють”., 'Soon they will shed blood without justice. They gather together the wicked, for they share their blood. These ways are the ways of the lawless, for they eat their souls with iniquity.' – α ("They make haste to shed blood unjustly. For they (133) promise blood, and gather evil. Their path runneth to evil, for they possess their souls in dishonor" (Prov., i, 16-19).')
וְ֭הֵם לְדָמָ֣םכֵּ֗ן אָ֭רְחֹות כָּל־בֹּ֣צֵֽעַ בָּ֑צַע אֶת־נֶ֖פֶשׁ בְּעָלָ֣יו יִקָּֽח׃ פ (...) וְ֭הֵם לְדָמָ֣ם יֶאֱרֹ֑בוּ (...) כִּ֣י רַ֭גְלֵיהֶם לָרַ֣ע יָר֑וּצוּ וִֽ֝ימַהֲר֗וּ לִשְׁפָּךְ־ דָּֽם׃, 'for their feet rush into evil, they are swift to shed blood. (...) These men lie in wait for their own blood; they ambush only themselves! Such are the paths of all who go after ill-gotten gain; it takes away the life of those who get it.' – Proverbs 1:16–19 NIV (KVJ: 'For their feet run to evil, and make haste to shed blood. (...) And they lay wait for their own blood; they lurk privily for their own lives. So are the ways of every one that is greedy of gain; which taketh away the life of the owners thereof.')
οι γαρ πόδες αυτών εις κακίαν τρέχουσι και ταχινοί εισι του εκχέαι αίμα (...) αυτοί γαρ οι φόνου μετέχοντες θησαυρίζουσιν εαυτοίς κακά[.] αύται αι οδοί εισι πάντων των συντελούντων τα άνομα τη γαρ ασεβεία την εαυτών ψυχήν αφαιρούνται, 'For their feet run to evil, and are quick to pour out blood. (...) For they, the ones partaking in murder, treasure up for themselves evils. These are the ways of all the ones completing the lawless [things]. For by impiety they remove their own life/soul.' – Proverbs 1:16–19 LXX ABP

=== 135–141.16 ===
Killing of Gleb and aftermath. See also Boris and Gleb.

135.1

акъ | хулу имуще, akû xulu imuše, 'as though they have blasphemy' – Lav
аки хвалоу имѹще, aki xvalou imuše, 'as though they have praise' – Rad, Aka
аки хвалу имуще, aki xvalu imuše, 'as though they have praise' – Ipa
акы хвалоу имѧще, aky xvalou imęše, 'as though they have praise' – Xle

135.27–136.1 Predslava Volodimerovna informs Yaroslav Volodimerovich, version A.

Въ сеже время пришьла бѣ вѣсть къ Ярославу отъ Передъславы о отьни съмьрти, и посъла Ярославъ къ Глѣбу, глаголя: “Не ходи, отьць ти умьрлъ, а братъ ти убиенъ отъ Святопълка”., 'At this moment, Yaroslav received from Predslava the tidings of [their] father's death, and Yaroslav sent [someone] to Gleb, saying: 'Do not set out, your father has died and your brother has been murdered by Svyatopolk."' – α
в се же времѧ пришла бѣ вѣсть ѿ передьславы кь ꙗрославу ѡ от҃ни смр҃ти. и посла ꙗрославъ кь глѣбу гл҃ѧ не ходи ѡц҃ь ти оум҃рлъ. а братъ ти оубитъ ѿ с҃тополка., 'At this moment, from Pered'slava Yaroslav received the tidings of [their] father's death, and Yaroslav sent [someone] to Glěb, saying: 'Do not set out, your father has died and your brother has been murdered by Svyatopolk."' – Ipa Xle
Compare Novgorod First Chronicle Younger Redaction (NPL ml):

В се же время пришла бЂ вЂсть къ Ярославу от Передславы о отни смерти, и посла Ярославъ къ ГлЂбу, глаголя: «отець ти умерлъ. а брат ти убиенъ от Святополка»., 'At the same time there came news to Yaroslav from Peredslava about [their] father's death, and Yaroslav sent [someone] to Glěb, saying: "Your father has died, and your brother has been killed by Svyatopolk."' – NPL ml

140.25–141.1 Predslava Volodimerovna informs Yaroslav Volodimerovich, version B.

Въ туже нощь приде ему вѣсть ис Кыева отъ сестры его Передъславы: “Отьць ти умьрлъ, а Святопълкъ сѣдить въ Кыевѣ, убивъ Бориса, а на Глѣба посъла; а блюди ся сего повелику”., 'The same night news came from Kiev sent by his sister Predslava: "Your father has died and Svyatopolk settled in Kiev. He has killed Boris, and has sent [men] against Gleb. Be exceedingly on your guard against him."' – α Lav Aka
в ту же нощь приде ему вѣсть ис кыева. ѿ сестры его передьславы ѡц҃ь ти оумерлъ а ст҃ополкъ сѣдить в киевѣ. пославъ оуби бориса и глѣба. а ты блюдисѧ сего повелику, 'The same night news came from Kyevŭ sent by his sister Pered'slava: "Your father has died and Svyatopolk settled in Kyevŭ, having sent [men] to kill Boris and Glěb. Be exceedingly on your guard against him."' – Ipa Xle Rad

=== 141.17–142.24 ===
Battle of Liubech (1016) between Sviatopolk I of Kiev and Yaroslav I of Kiev.

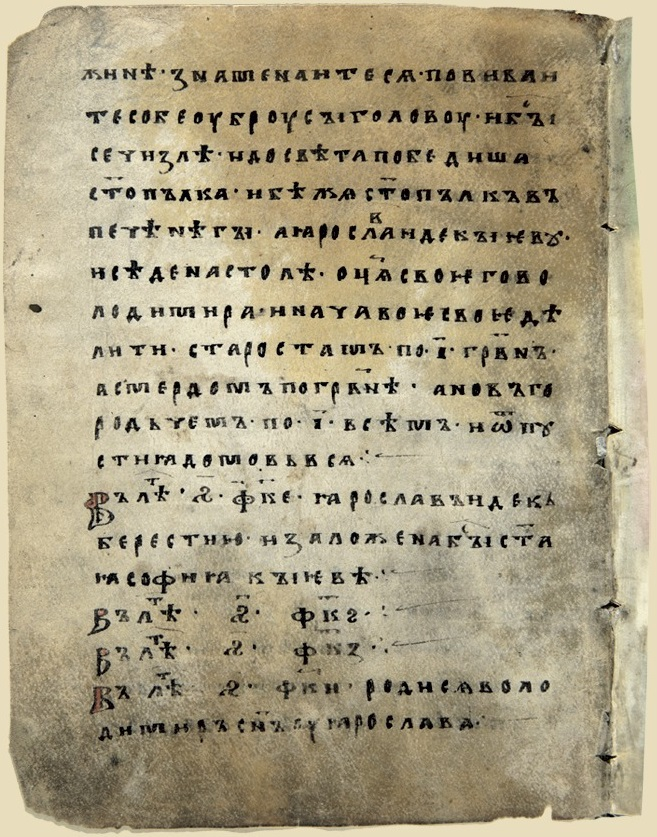
The Novgorod First Chronicle Synodal manuscript (NPL St.) starts in the middle of a sentence about the Battle of Liubech. The preceding folios have been lost.

Textual comparison of PVL and NPL manuscripts on the Battle of Liubech in Old East Slavic
Line (PVL)	Hypatian (Ipa) Radziwiłł (Rad) Academic (Aka)	Khlebnikov (Xle)	Laurentian (Lav)	Novgorod First Chronicle (NPL) Older Edition (St.)	Novgorod First Chronicle (NPL) Younger Edition (Ml.)
142.13b	И бысть сѣча зъла,				
–	–				оже за рукы емлющеся сЂчаху и по удолиемъ кровь течаше; мнозЂ вЂрнии видяху аггелы божиа помагающа Ярославу;
142.14	(и) не бѣ льзѣ озеръмь Печенѣгомъ помогати,			–	
142.15–16a	и притиснуша Святопълчь съ вои къ озеру.			–	
142.16b	И въступиша на ледъ,			–	
142.16c– 17a	–	и обломисѧ ле^{д} с вои ст҃опо^{л}чи и мнѡѕи потопоша въ вода^{х}. и	и ѡбломисѧ с ними ледъ. и	–	
142.17b	одолати нача Ярославъ.			–	
142.17c–18	Видѣвъ же Святопълкъ, побеже, и одолѣ Ярославъ.		[lacuna]	и до свЂта победиша Святопълка.	
142.19a	Святопълкъ же бѣжа въ Ляхы,			И бЂжя Святопълкъ въ ПечЂнЂгы,	
–	–				и бысть межи Чахы и Ляхы, (...).
142.19b–20	Ярославъ же сѣде Кыевѣ на столѣ отьни.		ꙗрославъ же сѣде кыевѣ на столѣ ѡтьни и дѣдни·	а Ярослав иде Кыеву, и сЂде на столЂ отця своего Володимира.	

Textual comparison of PVL and NPL manuscripts on the Battle of Liubech in English
Line (PVL)	Hypatian (Ipa) Radziwiłł (Rad) Academic (Aka)	Khlebnikov (Xle)	Laurentian (Lav)	Novgorod First Chronicle (NPL) Older Edition (St.)	Novgorod First Chronicle (NPL) Younger Edition (Ml.)
142.13b	And the battle was terrible,				
–	–				with them clutching each other's hands and blood flowing through the valleys; many of the faithful saw God's a[n]gels helping Yaroslav;
142.1	(and) due to the lake, the Pechenegs could not help.			–	
142.15–16a	And they pushed Sviatopolk with [his] soldiers to the lake.			–	
142.16b	And (when) they went onto the ice,			–	
142.16c– 17a	–	and the ice weakened under Sviatopolk's soldiers and many drowned in the waters.	and the ice weakened under them. And	–	
142.17b	Yaroslav began obtaining the advantage.			–	
142.17c–18	Seeing this, Sviatopolk fled, and Yaroslav won.		[lacuna]	and before daybreak they defeated Sviatopolk.	
142.19a	But Sviatopolk fled to the Lyakhs [Poles].			And Sviatopolk fled to the Pechenegs.	
–	–				And between the Czechs and Lyakhs [Poles], he [died] (...).
142.19b–20	But Yaroslavŭ settled in Kyevŭ upon [the] throne of [his] father.		But Jaroslavŭ settled in Kyevŭ upon [the] throne of [his] father and grandfather.	But Yaroslav went [to] Kyevu, and settled on [the] throne of his father Volodimer'.	

142.16–18

И въступиша на ледъ, и одолати нача Ярославъ. Видѣвъ же Святопълкъ, побеже, и одолѣ Ярославъ., 'And when they went onto the ice, Iaroslav began obtaining the advantage. Seeing this, Sviatopolk fled and Iaroslav won.' – Rad Aka Ipat α
и въступиша на ледъ. | и ѡбломисѧ с ними ледъ. и ѡ|далати нача ꙗрославъ. [lacuna], 'And they went onto the ice, and the ice weakened under them. And Iaroslav began obtaining the advantage. [lacuna]' – Lav
и въстоупиша на ле^{д}, и обломисѧ ле^{д} с вои ст҃опо^{л}чи | и мнѡѕи потопоша въ вода^{х}. и ѡдолѧти нача ꙗро|славь. видѣв же ст҃ополкь побѣже. и ѡдолѣ ꙗро|славь., 'And they went onto the ice, and the ice weakened under Sviatopolk's soldiers and many drowned in the waters. Iaroslav began obtaining the advantage. Seeing this, Sviatopolk fled and Iaroslav won.' – Xle

142.19

Святопълкъ же бѣжа въ Ляхы, Ярославъ же, 'But Sviatopolĭkŭ fled to Lyakh [Poland], but Yaroslavŭ' – all PVL mss. and editions
И бЂжя Святопълкъ въ ПечЂнЂгы, а Ярослав, 'And Sviatopolĭkŭ fled to the Pechěněgs, but Yaroslav' – NPL st.
И бЂжа Святополкъ в ПеченЂгы, и бысть межи Чахы и Ляхы, никим же гонимъ пропаде оканныи, и тако злЂ живот свои сконча; яже дымъ и до сего дни есть; а Ярославъ, 'And Sviatopolĭkŭ fled to the Pecheněgs, and he was between the Czechs [Bohemians] and the Lyakhs [Poles], and being chased by no one, the accursed ended his life in an evil way; and there is still stench from it to this day; but Yaroslavŭ' – NPL ml.

Compare PVL 144.28–145.20

142.19–20

Ярославъ же сѣде Кыевѣ на столѣ отьни., 'But Yaroslavŭ settled in Kyevŭ upon [the] throne of [his] father.' – Rad Aka Ipat Xle α
ꙗрославъ же сѣде кыевѣ на столѣ ѡтьни и дѣдни, 'But Jaroslavŭ settled in Kyevŭ upon [the] throne of [his] father and grandfather.' – Lav Byč Šax Lix
а Ярослав иде Кыеву, и сЂде на столЂ отця своего Володимира., 'But Yaroslav went [to] Kyevu, and settled on [the] throne of his father Volodimer'.' – NPL st. NPL. ml. (Ярославъ иде къ)

=== 151 ===
151.19

городъ, gorodŭ, 'citadel' – Lav Ipa Xle (горѡд) Byč Lix
градъ, gradŭ, 'citadel' – Rad Aka (град) Šax α

151.20

кыи, kyi, 'at Kyiv' – Lav
кыевъ, kyevŭ, 'at Kyev' – Ipa Xle Byč
omitted – Rad Aka Šax Lix α

151.21

црк҃вь | ст҃ыꙗ. соѳьꙗ митрополью., 'the metropolitan Church of St. Sophia' – Lav Aka
црк҃вь ст҃ыа софиа. и митрополью., 'the church of St. Sophia. And (the) metropolitan [church].' – Rad
црк҃вь. ст҃ыꙗ | софьꙗ. премудрость б҃ию | митрополью., 'the metropolitan Church of St. Sophia of divine wisdom' – Ipa
цр҃ковъ премѫдрѡс бж҃їю ст҃ыи соѳеи, митрополїю, 'the church of divine wisdom Saint Sophei, the metropolitan (one)' – Xle

=== 152 ===
152.20

симонъ, Simonŭ, 'Simon' – Lav
соломонъ, Solomonŭ, 'Solomon' – Aka, Ipa, Rad (соломнъ), Xle (солѡмонъ) Byč, Šax, Lix, α

=== 161 ===
The so-called Testament of Yaroslav the Wise.

161.18

переꙗславль. а вѧчеславу, pereyaslavl'. A vęcheslavu, '...Pereyaslavl'. To Vyacheslav...' – Lav Ipa Xle
Переяславль, а Вячеславу, Pereyaslavl', a Vyacheslavu, '...Pereyaslavl', to Vyacheslav...' – Šax α
переꙗславль. а вечславѹ, pereyaslavl'. A vechslavu, '...Pereyaslavl'. To Vechslav...' – Rad
переꙗславль. [а игорю воломеръ] а вечславѹ, pereyaslavl'. [a igoryu volomerŭ] a vechslavu, '...Pereyaslavl'. [To Igor Volomerŭ] to Vechslav...' – Aka
переꙗславль а игореви володимирь а вꙗчеславу, pereyaslavl' a igorevi volodimirĭ a vyacheslavu, '...Pereyaslavl' to Igorevi Volodimirĭ to Vyacheslav...' – Kom
переꙗславль а игореви володимиръ а вꙗчеву, pereyaslavl' a igorevi volodimirŭ a vyacheslavu, '...Pereyaslavl' to Igorevi Volodimirŭ to Vyachev...' – NAk Tol
Переяславль, а Игорю Володимеръ, а Вячеславу, Pereyaslavl', a Igoryu Volodimerŭ, a Vyacheslavu, '...Pereyaslavl', to Igor Volodimerŭ, to Vyacheslav...' – Byč Lix

It is not clear why 'to Igor[evi] Volo[di]merŭ' is found in relatively late copies, but not in the earliest copies. It could represent a harmonisation effort with 162.12–13 and 162.21–22, where all witnesses attest that 'Igor' [settled] in Volodimerŭ', and that when Vyacheslav died in Smolensk shortly thereafter, 'Igor' settled in Smolinĭskě, moving over from Volodimerŭ'. The Igor' in question is probably Igor Yaroslavich, who reportedly died sub anno 1060 (162.28). Cross & Sherbowitz-Wetzor (1953) and Thuis (2015) both included the city as Vladimir in their translations, footnoting it as "Vladimir-Volÿnsk" and "city in Volhynia" respectively (ergo, modern Volodymyr, Volyn Oblast), without further explanation.

=== 216–217 ===
215.27–218.5 Eulogy of Vsevolod Yaroslavich I of Kiev. Accession of Sviatopolk Iziaslavich II of Kiev (with prominent role for Vladimir II Monomakh).

=== 218–225 ===
218.6–226.3 Cuman (Polovtsi) invasion of Rus' (1093). See also Siege of Torchesk and Battle of the Stuhna River.

218.20–21

имѣю отрокъ своих· ѱ҃· иже могу|ть про[ти]ву имъ стати·, iměju otrokŭ svoix· ps· iže mogu tĭ pro[ti]vu imŭ stati·, 'I have about 700 of my men who can stand against them.' – Lav, Bychkov, Karski, Likhachev
имѣю ѿрокъ своих· ѿ иже могѹ|ть имъ противоу стать., iměju ōtrokŭ svoix· ō iže mogu tĭ imŭ protivou statĭ., 'I have about 800 of my men who can stand against them.' – Rad
имѣꙗ ѡтрокъ своих| ·ѿ· иже могѹть имь противѹ стати·, iměja ōtrokŭ svoix ·ō· iže mogutĭ imŭ protivu stati., 'I have about 800 of my men who can stand against them.' – Aka
имѣю ѡтро|къ своихъ· ·и҃·сот· иже мо|гуть [имъ] противу имъ ста|ти·, iměju ōtrokŭ svoixŭ· ·i·sot· iže mogutĭ [imŭ] protivu sta ti, 'I have about 8 hundred of my men who can stand against them' – Ipa
имѣю | отрѡк своих. ѡсмь сот. иже могоут противоу им сттаи., iměju otrōk svoix. vos[e]mŭ sot. iže mogout protivou im sttai., 'I have about eight hundred of my men who can stand against them' – Xle

=== 226–255 ===
226.3–255 Chernigov war of succession (1093–1097). See also Oleg I of Chernigov#Chernigov war of succession.

==== 235 ====
235.20

меѳоди папа римскыи·, Methodi papa Rimskyi·, 'Methodius the Pope of Rome' – Lav
мефодїи патариискы·̏и·, Methodïi Patariiskyi, 'Methodius of Patara' – Aka
меѳдии патариискыи, Methdii Patariiskyi, 'Methdius of Patara' – Rad

=== 256–257 ===
256–257.13.

=== 257–263 ===
257.13–263.17 The blinding of Vasilko Rostislavich.

=== 263–273 ===
263.17–273.16 Internecine war in Rus' 1097–1100.

=== 273–274 ===
273.16–274.22 Council of Uvetichi (c. 1100).

=== 275–276 ===
1101–1102. Dynastic challenges to Sviatopolk II Iziaslavich of Kiev by Yaroslav Yaropolkich of Brest (?) and Mstislav Volodimerovich of Novgorod. Peace with Polovtsi.

=== 277–279 ===
1103 campaign against the Polovtsi (Cumans) by Sviatopolk II Iziaslavich of Kiev and Vladimir II Monomakh. Battle of the Sutin River.

Compare the strikingly similar narrative of the 1111 campaign against the Polovtsi by Sviatopolk II and Monomakh in the Hypatian Codex лл.99–100.

=== 280 ===
1104: various dynastic events, siege of Minsk, signs in sky.

=== 281 ===
1105–1107: various dynastic events, Semigallians defeat Vseslavichi.

=== 282 ===
1107–1108: Polovtsi raid by Boniak. Peace treaty.

282.25–283.3. See also Aepa.

томьж лѣт мцса тогож иде володимеръ и двд҃ъ и ѡлегъ къ аепѣ и другому аепѣ· и створиша миръ· и поꙗ володимеръ за юргѧ· аепину дщерь· ѡсеневу внуку· а ѡлегъ поꙗ за сн҃а· аепину дчерь· гиргеневу внуку· мцса· генвр ·в҃і· дн҃ь·:·, 'That same year, in [the] same month, Volodimer' and D[a]v[i]d' and Ōleg' went to Ayepě and [the] other Ayepě. And [they] made peace. And Volodimer' took [as a wife] for Yurgę Aepa's (Aepinu's) daughter, Osen(ev)'s granddaughter, and Ōleg' took [as a wife] for [his] son Aepa's (Aepinu's) daughter, Girgen(ev)'s granddaughter, on [the] 12th day of [the] month of January.' – Lav
томъже лѣтѣ тогоже мцса иде володимеръ и двд҃ъ и ѡлегъ к аꙗпѣ· и другому аепѣ· и створиша миръ· и поꙗ володимеръ за гергиꙗ епиѡпину дщерь· ѧсѣну внука· а ѡлегъ поꙗ [ ] акаепиду дщерь ꙗневу внуку· мцса генварѧ· во вторы на ·і҃· дн҃ь·, 'That same year, in [the] same month, Volodimer' and D[a]v[i]d' and Ōleg' went to Ajapě and [the] other Aepě. And [they] made peace. And Volodimer' took [as a wife] for Gergija Epiōpa's (Epiōpinu's) daughter, Ęsěn(u)'s granddaughter, and Ōleg' took [as a wife] [space left blank] Akaepa's (Akaepidu's) daughter, Janev's (Janevu's) granddaughter, on [the] twelfth day of [the] month of January.' – Ipat

=== 283 ===
1108–1109: Sviatopolk II Iziaslavich of Kiev orders construction of various church buildings.

=== 284–285 ===
1109–1110: Rus' campaign against Polovtsi. Signs in sky at Kyiv Pechersk Lavra, including lightning, pillars of fire and cloud, and an angelic apparation.

=== 286.1–7 ===
286.1–7 Only in Lav, Rad and Aka: colophon of Sylvester of Kiev (1116).

=== 286.7a–7pp ===
286.7a–7pp Only in Ipa and Xle: Primary Chronicle continuation of the Hypatian Codex and Khlebnikov Codex (1110–1117).

286.7nn

ꙗкоже рече к моисѣеві· се англ҃ъ мои прѣды поидеть предъ лицемъ твоимъ· – Ipa
ꙗкоже реч к моѵ·̏сееви. се аг҃глъ мои предидет прде лицем твоим. – Xle
ӕкоже рече к Моисѣевı. се анг҃лъ мои прѣдыпоидеть предъ лицемъ твоимъ. – Šax 1908

286.7oo

ꙗкоже рекохомъ прѣже зьнаменье се быс· мцса февралѧ· – Ipa
ꙗкож рекохѡм прежед. знаменїе се быс. мцса феврал. – Xle
ӕкоже рекохомъ прѣже зьнаменье се быс̑ . мс̑ца февралѧ . – Šax 1908

286.7pp

въ ·а҃і· дн҃ь· исходѧще сему лѣту· и҃і·:·- – Ipa
въ а҃і. дн҃ь. – Xle
въ . а҃ı . дн҃ь . исходѧще сему лѣту. и҃ı – Šax 1908

== Hypatian PVL continuation ==
The Hypatian Codex continuation of the Primary Chronicle (PVL) from the year 6619 (1111) compared to other closely related documents, such as the Suzdalian Chronicle and the Testament of Vladimir Monomakh in the Laurentian Codex, and the Novgorod First Chronicle.

1111 campaign against the Polovtsi
Lav (Suzdalian Chronicle) л.96: В лѣт̑ . ҂s҃ . х҃ . ѳı҃ . Идоша веснѣ на Половцѣ Ст҃ополкъ Володимеръ Дв҃дъ и дошедше Воинѧ и воротишасѧ., 'In the year 6619 (1111) in the spring, Sviatopolk, Volodimer' and Davyd went to the Polovtsi and the warriors arrived and returned.'
Ipa лл.99–100: Extensive narrative; see Council of Dolobsk § Council of Dolobsk of 1111 in the Hypatian Codex and Battle of the Salnitsa river.

Monomakh's 1113 campaign against the Polovtsi
Lav (Monomakh's Testament): (omitted)
Ipa л.102об: слышавше же Половцѣ смерть Ст҃ополчю, slȳshavshe zhe Polovtsě smertĭ S[via]topolchyu, 'When the Polovtsi heard of Sviatopolk's death,'

Lav (Monomakh's Testament) 250.20–21a: к выреви бѧху пришли аепа и бонѧкъ· хот^{ѣ}ша взѧти, k vȳrevi bęlhu prishli aepa i bonękŭ, khotěsha vzęti, 'Aepa and Bonyak had approached Vÿr', wanting to take it.'
Ipa л.102об: и съвокупившесѧ и придоша къ Выры, i sŭvokupivshesę i pridosha kŭ Vȳrȳ, 'they gathered and marched on Vyr.'

Lav (Monomakh's Testament) 250.21b–22a: и ко ромну идох со ѡлгомь и з дѣтми на нь·, 'I advanced to meet them as far as Romnÿ with Oleg and my children.'
Ipa л.102об: Володимеръ же совокупивъ сн҃ы свои и сыновцѣ. иде къ Выру. и совокуписѧ съ Ѡлгомъ., 'But Volodimerŭ, having gathered his sons and cousins/nephews, advanced to Vyr and joined [his forces] with Oleg's.'

Lav (Monomakh's Testament) 250.22b: и ѡни ѡчитивше бѣжаша·, 'And [when] they noticed, they fled.'
Ipa л.102об: Половцѣ же бѣжаша., '[The] Polovtsi fled.'

== See also ==
- Rus' chronicle § List of Rus' chronicles
- Textual criticism of the Primary Chronicle
- Textual variants in the Hebrew Bible
- Textual variants in the New Testament

== Bibliography ==
=== Primary sources ===
- Complete Collection of Rus' Chronicles (PSRL). Saint Petersburg: Typography of Edward Prats.
  - Shakhmatov, Aleksey (1908). Лѣтопись По Ипатьевскому Списку [The Chronicle according to the Hypatian Codex]. Complete Collection of Rus' Chronicles (PSRL). (in Church Slavic). Vol. 2. Saint Petersburg: Typography of Edward Prats.
  - PSRL (1926–1928). Лаврентьевская летопись [Laurentian Chronicle]. Complete Collection of Rus' Chronicles (PSRL) (in Church Slavic). Vol. 1. Leningrad: USSR Academy of Sciences Publishing House.
- Cross, Samuel Hazzard; Sherbowitz-Wetzor, Olgerd P. (1953) [1930]. The Russian Primary Chronicle, Laurentian Text. Translated and edited by Samuel Hazzard Cross and Olgerd P. Sherbowitz-Wetzor (PDF). Cambridge, Massachusetts: The Mediaeval Academy of America. p. 325.
  - Cross, Samuel Hazzard; Sherbowitz-Wetzor, Olgerd P. (2013) [1953]. SLA 218. Ukrainian Literature and Culture. Excerpts from The Rus' Primary Chronicle (Povest vremennykh let, PVL) (PDF). Toronto: Electronic Library of Ukrainian Literature, University of Toronto. p. 16. Archived from the original (PDF) on 30 May 2014.
- Gorsky, A. A. (2012). "Приглашение Рюрика на княжение в памятниках древнерусского начального летописания" [Rurik's invitation to reign in the records of the old Rus' Primary Chronicle]. Исторический вестник (Historical Messenger) (in Russian). 1 (1). Runivers: 6–23. (web text)
- Ostrowski, Donald, ed. (2003). The Povest' vremennykh let: An Interlinear Collation and Paradosis. 3 volumes (in Russian and English). Cambridge, MA: Harvard University Press. Archived from the original on 9 March 2005. (assoc. ed. David J. Birnbaum (Harvard Library of Early Ukrainian Literature, vol. 10, parts 1–3)) – This 2003 Ostrowski et al. edition includes an interlinear collation including the five main manuscript witnesses, the Trinity Chronicle (as far as can reliably reconstructed), three manuscripts of the Novgorod First Chronicle, as well as a new paradosis ("a proposed best reading").
  - Ostrowski, Donald; Birnbaum, David J. (7 December 2014). "Rus' primary chronicle critical edition – Interlinear line-level collation". pvl.obdurodon.org (in Church Slavic). Archived from the original on 28 April 2025. – A 2014 digitised and improved online version of Ostrowski et al. 2003.
- Izbornyk (2001). "Новгородская Первая Летопись" [Novgorod First Chronicle]. Izbornyk (in Church Slavic). Nauka. – digitised 1950 Nauka edition of the Novgorod First Chronicle (NPL), including both the Synodal (Synodalnyy) or "Older Edition" (Starshego Izvoda, St.) and the mid-15th-century Archaeographic Commission's edition (Komissionnyy) or "Younger Edition" (Mladshego Izvoda, Ml.)
- Thuis, Hans (2015). Nestorkroniek. De oudste geschiedenis van het Kievse Rijk [Nestor Chronicle: the oldest history of the Kievan Realm] (in Dutch). Nijmegen: Uitgeverij Vantilt. p. 304. ISBN 9789460042287.

=== Literature ===
- Butler, Francis (2008). "Ol'Ga's Conversion and the Construction of Chronicle Narrative". The Russian Review. 67 (2). Wiley: 230–242. doi:10.1111/j.1467-9434.2008.00482.x. ISSN 0036-0341. JSTOR 20620746.
- Dimnik, Martin (January 2004). "The Title "Grand Prince" in Kievan Rus'". Mediaeval Studies. 66: 253–312. doi:10.1484/J.MS.2.306512.
- Gippius, Alexey A. (2014). "Reconstructing the original of the Povesť vremennyx let: a contribution to the debate". Russian Linguistics. 38 (3). Springer: 341–366. doi:10.1007/s11185-014-9137-y. JSTOR 43945126.
- Lunt, Horace G. (Summer 1988). "On Interpreting the Russian Primary Chronicle: The Year 1037". The Slavic and East European Journal. 32 (2): 251–264. doi:10.2307/308891. JSTOR 308891.
- Lunt, Horace G. (June 1994). "Lexical Variation in the Copies of the Rus' "Primary Chronicle": Some Methodological Problems". Ukrainian Philology and Linguistics. 18 (1–2). Harvard Ukrainian Research Institute: 10–28. JSTOR 41036551.
- Lunt, Horace G. (1995). "What the Rus' Primary Chronicle Tells Us about the Origin of the Slavs and of Slavic Writing". Harvard Ukrainian Studies. 19. Harvard Ukrainian Research Institute: 335–357. ISSN 0363-5570. JSTOR 41037009.
- Müller, Ludolf (2005). "Studien zur altrussischen Legende der Heiligen Boris und Gleb (6): III. Die Quellen der Chronikerzählung: 2. Die Erzählung über die Schlacht bei Ljubeč". Zeitschrift für Slavische Philologie (in German). 64 (2). Universitätsverlag WINTER Gmbh: 245–278. ISSN 0044-3492. JSTOR 24003950.
- Ostrowski, Donald (March 1981). "Textual Criticism and the Povest' vremennykh let: Some Theoretical Considerations". Harvard Ukrainian Studies. 5 (1). Harvard Ukrainian Research Institute: 11–31. JSTOR 41035890.
- Ostrowski, Donald (2006). "Alexander Nevskii's 'Battle on the Ice': The Creation of a Legend". Russian History/Histoire Russe. 33 (2/4). Brill: 289–312. doi:10.1163/187633106X00186. ISSN 0094-288X. JSTOR 24664446.
- Ostrowski, Donald (2007). "The Načal'Nyj Svod Theory and the Povest Vremennyx Let". Russian Linguistics. 31 (3). Springer: 269–308. doi:10.1007/s11185-007-9014-z. ISSN 0304-3487. JSTOR 40221289.
- Plokhy, Serhii (2006). The Origins of the Slavic Nations: Premodern Identities in Russia, Ukraine, and Belarus. New York: Cambridge University Press. p. 378. ISBN 978-0-521-86403-9.

=== Further reading ===
- Isoaho, Mari (2018). "Shakhmatov's Legacy and the Chronicles of Kievan Rus'". Kritika: Explorations in Russian and Eurasian History. 19 (3). Slavica Publishers: 637–648. doi:10.1353/kri.2018.0033.
- Inés García de la Puente, "Beyond the Sea: On the Use of за море in the Primary Chronicle". Ruthenica. 16. 28–36. 2022.
