= Battle of Liubech =

- Part of the Kievan succession crisis of 1015–1019
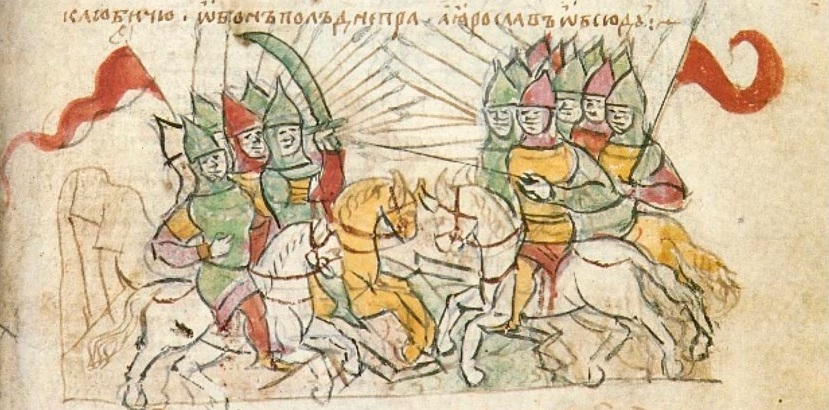
- Battle of Liubech. Miniature in the Radziwiłł Chronicle (15th century).
Date	Autumn 1016
Location	near Liubech (a village in the modern Ripky Raion of Chernihiv Oblast)
Result	Victory of Yaroslav's forces

Belligerents
Sviatopolk	Yaroslav

Commanders and leaders
Sviatopolk the Accursed	Yaroslav the Wise; Eimund Gringsson

The Battle of Liubech (1016) was a clash between the troops of Sviatopolk (prince of Kiev and Turov) and his brother Yaroslav (prince of Novgorod) near the town of Liubech (modern Chernihiv Oblast). It was part of the Kievan succession crisis of 1015–1019 that broke out between the brothers after the death of prince Volodimer I of Kiev (1015).

== In Rus' chronicles ==
The most extensive narrative of the battle is found in the Primary Chronicle (PVL) sub anno 6524 (1016). Similar but divergent narratives are found in the Older and Younger Editions of the Novgorod First Chronicle (NPL).

Initially, the eldest son Sviatopolk took the throne of Kiev (modern Kyiv), and in an attempt to get rid of other contenders for princely power, killed his brothers Boris, Gleb, and Sviatoslav the Derevlian. Sviatopolk was opposed by Yaroslav, who gathered a large army in Novgorod and then marched south. The two armies met near Liubech and reportedly did not dare to start fighting for three months.

Eventually, in late 1016, a decisive battle took place at Liubech. The main textual witnesses of the Primary Chronicle provide conflicting accounts on details (in lines 141.17–142.22) of the battle, with additional variants in the Novgorod First Chronicle.

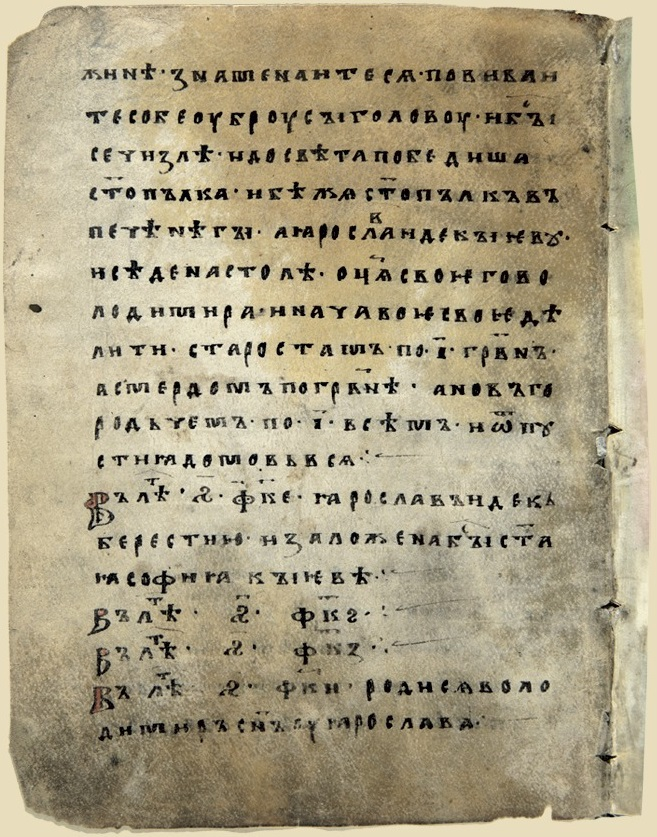
The Novgorod First Chronicle Synodal manuscript (NPL St.) starts in the middle of a sentence about the Battle of Liubech. The preceding folios have been lost.

Textual comparison of PVL and NPL manuscripts on the Battle of Liubech in Old East Slavic
Line (PVL)	Hypatian (Ipa) Radziwiłł (Rad) Academic (Aka)	Khlebnikov (Xle)	Laurentian (Lav)	Novgorod First Chronicle (NPL) Older Edition (St.)	Novgorod First Chronicle (NPL) Younger Edition (Ml.)
142.13b	И бысть сѣча зъла,				
–	–				оже за рукы емлющеся сЂчаху и по удолиемъ кровь течаше; мнозЂ вЂрнии видяху аггелы божиа помагающа Ярославу;
142.14	(и) не бѣ льзѣ озеръмь Печенѣгомъ помогати,			–	
142.15–16a	и притиснуша Святопълчь съ вои къ озеру.			–	
142.16b	И въступиша на ледъ,			–	
142.16c– 17a	–	и обломисѧ ле^{д} с вои ст҃опо^{л}чи и мнѡѕи потопоша въ вода^{х}. и	и ѡбломисѧ с ними ледъ. и	–	
142.17b	одолати нача Ярославъ.			–	
142.17c–18	Видѣвъ же Святопълкъ, побеже, и одолѣ Ярославъ.		[lacuna]	и до свЂта победиша Святопълка.	
142.19a	Святопълкъ же бѣжа въ Ляхы,			И бЂжя Святопълкъ въ ПечЂнЂгы,	
–	–				и бысть межи Чахы и Ляхы, (...).
142.19b–20	Ярославъ же сѣде Кыевѣ на столѣ отьни.		ꙗрославъ же сѣде кыевѣ на столѣ ѡтьни и дѣдни·	а Ярослав иде Кыеву, и сЂде на столЂ отця своего Володимира.	

Textual comparison of PVL and NPL manuscripts on the Battle of Liubech in English
Line (PVL)	Hypatian (Ipa) Radziwiłł (Rad) Academic (Aka)	Khlebnikov (Xle)	Laurentian (Lav)	Novgorod First Chronicle (NPL) Older Edition (St.)	Novgorod First Chronicle (NPL) Younger Edition (Ml.)
142.13b	And the battle was terrible,				
–	–				with them clutching each other's hands and blood flowing through the valleys; many of the faithful saw God's a[n]gels helping Yaroslav;
142.14	(and) due to the lake, the Pechenegs could not help.			–	
142.15–16a	And they pushed Sviatopolk with [his] soldiers to the lake.			–	
142.16b	And (when) they went onto the ice,			–	
142.16c– 17a	–	and the ice weakened under Sviatopolk's soldiers and many drowned in the waters.	and the ice weakened under them. And	–	
142.17b	Yaroslav began obtaining the advantage.			–	
142.17c–18	Seeing this, Sviatopolk fled, and Yaroslav won.		[lacuna]	and before daybreak they defeated Sviatopolk.	
142.19a	But Sviatopolk fled to the Lyakhs [Poles].			And Sviatopolk fled to the Pechenegs.	
–	–				And between the Czechs and Lyakhs [Poles], he [died] (...).
142.19b–20	But Yaroslavŭ settled in Kyevŭ upon [the] throne of [his] father.		But Jaroslavŭ settled in Kyevŭ upon [the] throne of [his] father and grandfather.	But Yaroslav went [to] Kyevu, and settled on [the] throne of his father Volodimer'.	

Sviatopolk's army was defeated, and he fled to his father-in-law, the Polish duke Bolesław I the Brave. Yaroslav entered Kiev and for the first time became prince of Kiev.

Researcher Donald Ostrowski (2006) reasoned that the majority reading in the Hypatian (Ipa), Radziwiłł (Rad), and Academic (Aka) manuscripts represent the original text; the ice neither weakened nor broke in the original story. Nevertheless, Ostrowski comments that the later texts may well have influenced Sergei Eisenstein's 1938 historical drama film Alexander Nevsky, detailing the events of the Battle on the Ice in 1242. Rather than simply taking place "on the ice" (just like in the 1016 Battle of Liubech), Eisenstein's film depicts the popular misconception of the ice breaking and many Teutonic Knights drowning, differing from any of the primary sources describing the battle.

== In the Chronicon Thietmari and the Eymund Saga ==
At the same time, the literature suggests that Yaroslav's opponent in the battle of Lyubech might not have been Sviatopolk, who, according to Thietmar of Merseburg fled to Poland immediately after Volodimer's death, and Mstislav the Brave or Sviatoslav the Derevlian.

According to certain scholarly interpretations of the Eymundar þáttr hrings saga, the Varangian chief Eymund may have participated in this battle with Varangian mercenaries on Yaroslav's side, but this is contested.

== Bibliography ==
=== Primary sources ===
- Primary Chronicle (c. 1110s).
  - Cross, Samuel Hazzard; Sherbowitz-Wetzor, Olgerd P. (1953). The Russian Primary Chronicle, Laurentian Text. Translated and edited by Samuel Hazzard Cross and Olgerd P. Sherbowitz-Wetzor (PDF). Cambridge, Massachusetts: The Mediaeval Academy of America. p. 325. (First edition published in 1930. The first 50 pages are a scholarly introduction.)
  - Thuis, Hans (2015). Nestorkroniek. De oudste geschiedenis van het Kievse Rijk (in Dutch). Nijmegen: Uitgeverij Vantilt. p. 304. ISBN 9789460042287.
  - Ostrowski, Donald; Birnbaum, David J. (7 December 2014). "Rus' primary chronicle critical edition – Interlinear line-level collation". pvl.obdurodon.org (in Church Slavic). Archived from the original on 28 April 2025.
- Izbornyk (2001). "Новгородская Первая Летопись" [Novgorod First Chronicle]. Izbornyk (in Church Slavic). Nauka. – digitised 1950 Nauka edition of the Novgorod First Chronicle (NPL), including both the Synodal (Synodalnyy) or "Older Edition" (Starshego Izvoda, St.) and the mid-15th-century Archaeographic Commission's edition (Komissionnyy) or "Younger Edition" (Mladshego Izvoda, Ml.)
- Thietmar of Merseburg, Chronicon Thietmari (1018).
  - Warner, David A., ed. (2001). Ottonian Germany: The Chronicon of Thietmar of Merseburg. Manchester Medieval Sources Series. Manchester & New York: Manchester University Press. ISBN 0-7190-4926-1.

=== Literature ===
- Kotlyar, Mykola (2009). "Любецька битва 1016" [Battle of Liubech 1016]. Encyclopedia of History of Ukraine (in Ukrainian). Institute of History of Ukraine. Archived from the original on 16 September 2016.
- Martin, Janet (2007). Medieval Russia: 980–1584. Second Edition. E-book. Cambridge: Cambridge University Press. ISBN 978-0-511-36800-4.
- Müller, Ludolf (2005). "Studien zur altrussischen Legende der Heiligen Boris und Gleb (6): III. Die Quellen der Chronikerzählung: 2. Die Erzählung über die Schlacht bei Ljubeč". Zeitschrift für Slavische Philologie (in German). 64 (2). Universitätsverlag WINTER Gmbh: 245–278. ISSN 0044-3492. JSTOR 24003950.
- Ostrowski, Donald (2006). "Alexander Nevskii's 'Battle on the Ice': The Creation of a Legend". Russian History/Histoire Russe. 33 (2/4). Brill: 289–312. doi:10.1163/187633106X00186. ISSN 0094-288X. JSTOR 24664446.
- Raffensperger, Christian; Ostrowski, Donald (2023). The Ruling Families of Rus: Clan, Family and Kingdom. London: Reaktion Books. p. 309. ISBN 978-1-78914-745-2. (e-book)
