= Textual variants in the Book of Exodus =

Differences in Book of Exodus manuscripts

Textual variants in the Book of Exodus concerns textual variants in the Hebrew Bible found in the Book of Exodus.

== Legend ==
Purported inter-relationship between significant ancient Old Testament manuscripts (some identified by their siglum).

Frequently used sigla (symbols and abbreviations) of Hebrew Bible manuscripts and editions include:

א: Codex Sinaiticus
A: Codex Alexandrinus
B: Codex Vaticanus (Roman Septuagint)
C: Codex Ephraemi Rescriptus
ABP: Apostolic Bible Polyglot
AC: Aleppo Codex
BHS: Biblia Hebraica Stuttgartensia
Brenton: Brenton's Septuagint Translation 1879
LC: Leningrad Codex
LXX: Septuagint (list)
LXX^{Rahlfs}: Rahlfs' Septuagint 1935
LXX^{Swete}: Swete's Septuagint 1930
K: ketiv
Kennicott^{x}: Kennicott's Vetus Test. Hebraicum
MAM: Miqra according to the Masorah
m.: Mishna
MT or 𝕸: Masoretic Text
MT^{Ginsburg}: C.D. Ginsburg's Masoretic Text
OL or: Old Latin / Vetus Latina (list)
Q: qere
xQx: Dead Sea Scrolls (list)
S: Peshitta
SP: Samaritan Pentateuch
Tg: Targum
Tg^{Be}: Targum Berlin Orientalis 1213
Tg^{J}: Targum Jonathan
Tg^{O}: Targum Onqelos
Tg^{N}: Targum Neofiti
Tg^{PJ}: Targum Pseudo-Jonathan
Vg: Vulgate (list)
Vg^{Clement}: Clementine Vulgate 1592
Vg^{Colunga&Turrado}: A. Colunga & L. Turrado's Vulgata 1946
Vg^{neo}: Nova Vulgata 1979
WLC: Westminster Leningrad Codex

== List ==
This list provides examples of known textual variants, and contains the following parameters: Hebrew texts written right to left, the Hebrew text romanised left to right, an approximate English translation, and which Hebrew manuscripts or critical editions of the Hebrew Bible this textual variant can be found in. Greek (Septuagint) and Latin (Vulgate) texts are written left to right, and not romanised. Sometimes additional translation or interpretation notes are added, with references to similar verses elsewhere, or in-depth articles on the topic in question.

=== Exodus 1 ===
Exodus 1:11

פִּתֹ֖ם, pi-ṯōm, 'Pithom' – MT
Πιθώμ, Pithom – LXX ABP
Pithon – OL^{Sb} Vg
Phythonam – OL^{L}

Exodus 1:15

שִׁפְרָ֔ה, šip̄-rāh, 'Shiphrah' – MT
Σεπφώρα, Sepphóra – LXX ABP
Sepphora – OL^{L}
Sephra – Vg

=== Exodus 3 ===
Exodus 3:14

וַיֹּ֤אמֶר אֱלֹהִים֙ אֶל־מֹשֶׁ֔ה אֶֽהְיֶ֖ה אֲשֶׁ֣ר אֶֽהְיֶ֑ה, way-yō-mer ’ĕ-lō-hîm ’el-mō-šeh, ’eh-yeh ’ă-šer ’eh-yeh;, '[And] the god/God said to Moses: "I am that/who I am",' – WLC
καὶ εἶπεν ὁ θεὸς πρὸς Μωυσῆν λέγων Ἐγώ εἰμι ὁ ὤν·, 'and the god said to Moses, saying: "I am the being / the [one] who is/exists."' – LXX^{Swete}
καὶ εἶπεν ὁ Θεὸς πρὸς Μωυσῆν, λέγων, ἐγώ εἰμι ὁ Ὤν·, 'And God spoke to Moses, saying, I am THE BEING' – Brenton
και είπεν ο θεός προς Μωυσήν εγώ ειμι ο ων, 'And God said to Moses, I am the one being.' – ABP
Dixit Deus ad Moysen: Ego sum qui sum., 'God said to Moses: I am who I am.' – Vg^{Colunga&Turrado}

See also I Am that I Am, Burning bush, and Yahweh § Name.

=== Exodus 6 ===
Exodus 6:14

פַלּוּא֙, p̄al-lū, 'Pallu' – MT
Φαλλους, Phallous – LXX
Φαλλού, Phallou – ABP
Fallus – OL^{L}
Phallu – Vg

Exodus 6:15

אֹ֙הַד֙, ’ō-haḏ, 'Ohad' – MT
Ωαδ, Oad – LXX
Ιωαδ, Ioad – B
Αωδ, Aod – ABP
Aod – OL^{L} Vg

Exodus 6:15

צֹ֔חַר, ṣō-ḥar, 'Zohar' – MT
Σααρ, Saar – LXX ABP
Saar – OL^{L}
Soer – Vg

Exodus 6:21

נֶ֖פֶג, ne-p̄eḡ, 'Nepheg' – MT
Ναφεγ, Napheg – LXX
Ναφεχ, Naphech – B
Ναφεκ, Naphek – ABP
Naphaec – OL^{L}
Nepheg – Vg

Exodus 6:22

אֶלְצָפָ֖ן, ’el-ṣā-p̄ān, 'Elzaphan' – MT
Ελισαφαν, Elisaphan – LXX ABP
Elisapham – OL^{L}
Elsaphan – Vg

Exodus 6:22

סִתְרִֽי, siṯ-rî, 'Zithri' – MT
Σετρι, Setri – LXX
Ζεχρι, Zechri – ABP
Zetri – OL^{L}
Sethri – Vg

Exodus 6:23

אֱלִישֶׁ֧בַע, ’ĕ-lî-še-ḇa‘, 'Elisheba' – MT
Ελισάβεθ, Elisabeth – LXX ABP
Elisabet – OL^{L}
Elisabe – Vg

Exodus 6:24

אֲבִיאָסָ֑ף, ’ă-ḇî-’ā-sāp̄, 'Abiasaph' – MT
Αβιασαφ, Abiasaph – LXX
Αβιασαρ, Abiasar – A B ABP
Abisar – OL^{L}
Abiasab – Vg

Exodus 6:25

פּֽוּטִיאֵל֙, pū-ṭî-’êl, 'Putiel' – MT
Φουτιήλ, Phoutiel – LXX ABP
Phutiel – OL^{L}
Phutihel – Vg

=== Exodus 13 ===
Exodus 13:20

אֵתָ֔ם, ’ê-ṯām, 'Etham' – MT
Οθομ, Othom – LXX
Othon – OL^{M}
Etham – Vg

=== Exodus 14 ===
Exodus 14:2

פִּ֣י הַחִירֹ֔ת, pî ha-ḥî-rōṯ, 'Pi Hahiroth' – MT
τῆς ἐπαύλεως, tes epaúleos, 'of the farm/estate/property' – LXX ABP
Epauleum – OL^{M}
Phiahiroth – Vg

Exodus 14:9

פִּ֣י הַחִירֹ֔ת, pî ha-ḥî-rōṯ, 'Pi Hahiroth' – MT
τῆς ἐπαύλεως, tes epaúleos, 'of the farm/estate/property' – LXX ABP
Epauleum – OL^{M}
Ahiroth – Vg

=== Exodus 17 ===
Exodus 17:1, see also Battle of Refidim

רְפִידִ֔ים, r-p̄î-ḏîm, 'Rephidim' – MT
Ραφιδιν, Raphidin – LXX
Ραφιδείν, Raphideín – ABP
Rapidin – OL^{M}
Raphidin – OL^{Sb}
Raphidim – Vg

Exodus 17:8, see also Battle of Refidim

רְפִידִ֔ים, r-p̄î-ḏîm, 'Rephidim' – MT
Ραφιδιν, Raphidin – LXX
Ραφιδίν, Raphidín – ABP
Rapidin – OL^{M}
Raphidin – OL^{Sb}
Raphidim – Vg

=== Exodus 19 ===
Exodus 19:2, see also Battle of Refidim

רְפִידִ֔ים, rə-p̄î-ḏîm, 'Rephidim' – MT
Ραφιδιν, Raphidin – LXX
Ραφιδείμ, Raphideím – ABP
Rapidin – OL^{M}
Raphidin – OL^{Sb}
Raphidim – Vg

Exodus 19:16

וַיְהִי֩ קֹלֹ֨ת וּבְרָקִ֜ים, way-hî qō-lōṯ ū-ḇə-rā-qîm, 'and there were voices/sounds/noises/thunders and lightnings / flashes of lightning / gleamings' – WLC
ויהי קולות וברקים, way-hi q-v-l-v-t ū-ḇə-rā-qîm, 'and there were voices/sounds/noises/thunders and lightnings / flashes of lightning / gleamings' – SP
καὶ ἐγίνοντο φωναὶ καὶ ἀστραπαὶ, 'and there were voices/sounds and lightnings / flashes of lightning / brightnesses' – LXX^{Swete} Brenton
και εγένοντο φωναί και άστραπαι, 'and there were voices/sounds and lightnings / flashes of lightning / brightnesses' – ABP
et ecce coeperunt audiri tonitrua, ac micare fulgura, 'and behold, thunders began to be heard, and lightnings to flash' – Vg^{Colunga&Turrado}

Compare Exodus 20:18.

=== Exodus 20 ===
Exodus 20 in Brenton's Septuagint translation (1879)

Exodus 20:1

וַיְדַבֵּ֣ר אֱלֹהִ֔ים אֵ֛ת כָּל־הַדְּבָרִ֥ים הָאֵ֖לֶּה לֵאמֹֽר׃ ס, way-ḏab-bêr ’ĕ-lō-hîm, ’êṯ kāl-had-də-ḇā-rîm hā-’êl-leh lê-mōr., 'And [the] god/God spoke all these words, saying,' – WLC (1QExod 4QPaleoExod^{m}) SP
Καὶ ἐλάλησεν Κύριος πάντας τοὺς λόγους τούτους λέγων, 'And the Lord spoke all these words, saying,' – LXX LXX^{Swete} LXX^{Rahlfs} Brenton ABP
Dominus, '[the] Lord' – Vg Vg^{Colunga&Turrado}

Compare Deuteronomy 5:5.

Exodus 20:2, see also I am the Lord thy God

אָֽנֹכִ֖י֙ יְהוָ֣ה אֱלֹהֶ֑֔יךָ, ’ā-nō-ḵî Yah-weh ’ĕ-lō-he-ḵā,, 'I [am] Yahweh your god' – WLC
Ἐγώ εἰμι Κύριος ὁ θεός σου, 'I am Lord the god of yours' – LXX^{Swete}
ἐγώ εἰμι Κύριος ὁ Θεός σου, 'I am Lord the God of yours' – Brenton
εγώ ειμι κύριος ο θεός σου, 'I am lord the god of yours' – LXX^{Rahlfs} ABP
Ego sum Dominus Deus tuus,, 'I am (the) Lord your God,' – Vg^{Colunga&Turrado}

Compare Deuteronomy 5:6.

Exodus 20:2, see also I am the Lord thy God

δουλίας, 'of slavery' – LXX^{Swete} (Pontic Greek spelling)
δουλείας, 'of slavery' – LXX^{Rahlfs} Brenton ABP (Attic and Koine Greek spelling)

Compare Deuteronomy 5:6.

Exodus 20:3, see also Thou shalt have no other gods before me

לֹֽ֣א יִהְיֶֽה־לְךָ֛֩ אֱלֹהִ֥֨ים אֲחֵרִ֖֜ים עַל־פָּנָֽ֗יַ, lō yih-yeh-lə-ḵā ’ĕ-lō-hîm ’ă-ḥê-rîm ‘al-pā-nā-ya,, 'You shall not have other/further gods over/against/above/beside me' – WLC

אֲחֵרִ֖֜ים ’ă-ḥê-rîm is from H312 אחר (achér), which can mean "another", "other", "different", "further", "subsequent", "following", "next", "after".
עַל־ al- is from H5921 על (al), which can mean "over", "against", "above", "beside(s)" (or "along(side)"), "about/concerning", "according", or many other less frequent meanings, and features in the name El Al ("Upwards").

Οὐκ ἔσονταί σοι θεοὶ ἕτεροι πλὴν ἐμοῦ., 'There shall not be to you other gods besides/except me' – LXX^{Swete} LXX^{Rahlfs} Brenton ABP

ἕτεροι heteroi is from ἕτερος, which can mean "other", "another", "different", "second", "after", and the origin of the English word hetero-.

Non habebis deos alienos coram me., '[You] shall have no alien/foreign/strange gods before me / in my presence.' – Vg^{Colunga&Turrado}

alienos is from aliēnus (compare alius and alter), and the origin of the English word alien.
Compare Deuteronomy 5:7 (Hebrew witnesses identical, Greek and Latin witnesses different).

Exodus 20:5, see also Thou shalt not make unto thee any graven image

כִּ֣י אָֽנֹכִ֞י יְהוָ֤ה אֱלֹהֶ֙יךָ֙ אֵ֣ל קַנָּ֔א, kî ’ā-nō-ḵî Yah-weh ’ĕ-lō-he-ḵā ’êl qan-nā, 'because I Yahweh your god [am a] jealous god' – MT WLC SP
קנוא, qanno, 'jealous' – Pap^{Nash} (H7072 instead of H7067 קַנָּא qanna in MT SP)
ἐγὼ γάρ εἰμι Κύριος ὁ θεός σου, θεὸς ζηλωτής,, 'because I am [the] Lord your god, [a] zealot-god,' – LXX^{Swete} LXX^{Rahlfs} Brenton ABP

The words ζῆλος and ζηλωτής are the roots of many words including zeal, zealot, zealotry, zealous, jealous and jealousy.

ego sum Dominus Deus tuus fortis, zelotes,, 'I am (the) Lord your strong God, [a] zelot,' – Vg^{Colunga&Turrado}

Compare Deuteronomy 5:9.

Exodus 20:5, see also Thou shalt not make unto thee any graven image

עַל־שִׁלֵּשִׁ֥ים וְעַל־רִבֵּעִ֖ים, ‘al- šil-lê-šîm wə-‘al- rib-bê-‘îm, 'to/on thirds and fourths' – WLC
ἕως τρίτης καὶ τετάρτης γενεᾶς, 'until of [the] third and fourth generation' – LXX^{Swete} LXX^{Rahlfs} Brenton
επί τρίτην και τετάρτην γενεάν, '(up)on/(un)to/against [the] third and fourth generation' – ABP
in tertiam et quartam generationem, 'into/to(wards)/against/until [the] third and fourth generation' – Vg^{Colunga&Turrado}

Compare Deuteronomy 5:9.

Exodus 20:7, see also Thou shalt not take the name of the Lord thy God in vain

λήψη, 'shall take' – ABP Brenton (classical Greek spelling)
λήμψῃ, 'shall take' – LXX^{Swete} LXX^{Rahlfs} (Koine Greek spelling)

Compare Deuteronomy 5:11.

Exodus 20:7, see also Thou shalt not take the name of the Lord thy God in vain

לֹ֤א יְנַקֶּה֙ יְהוָ֔ה, lō yə-naq-qeh Yah-weh, 'Yahweh will not acquit / leave unpunished / hold guiltless' – WLC
μὴ καθαρίσῃ Κύριος, '[the] Lord shall not cleanse' – LXX^{Swete} LXX^{Rahlfs}
μὴ καθαρίσει Κύριος, '[the] Lord shall not cleanse' – ABP
μὴ καθαρίσῃ Κύριος ὁ Θεός σου, '[the] Lord your God shall not cleanse' – Brenton
nec...habebit insontem Dominus eum, 'and [the] Lord will not hold/consider him innocent' – Vg^{Colunga&Turrado}

Compare Deuteronomy 5:11.

Exodus 20:10, see also Remember the sabbath day, to keep it holy

וּבְהֶמְתֶּ֔֗ךָ, ū-ḇə-hem-te-ḵā,, 'your cattle,' – WLC
ὁ βοῦς σου, καὶ τὸ ὑποζύγιόν σου, καὶ πᾶν κτῆνός σου, 'your ox/cow, and your beast of burden/donkey/mule, and all your beasts of burden/cattle,' – LXX^{Swete} LXX^{Rahlfs} Brenton ABP
jumentum tuum,, 'your beast of burden,' – Vg^{Colunga&Turrado}

Exodus 20:10, see also Remember the sabbath day, to keep it holy

וְגֵרְךָ֖֙ אֲשֶׁ֥֣ר בִּשְׁעָרֶֽ֔יךָ ׃, wə-ḡê-rə-ḵā ’ă-šer biš-‘ā-re-ḵā,, 'your stranger/sojourner who [is] within your gates' – WLC
καὶ ὁ προσήλυτος ὁ παροικῶν ἐν σοί., 'and the proselyte/convert the [one] sojourning among you.' – LXX^{Swete} LXX^{Rahlfs} Brenton ABP
et advena qui est intra portas tuas., 'and [the] stranger/foreigner/guest/newcomer who is within your gates.' – Vg^{Colunga&Turrado}

Exodus 20:11, see also Remember the sabbath day, to keep it holy

אֶת־הַיָּם֙, ’eṯ- hay-yām, 'the sea' – WLC
καὶ τὴν θάλασσαν, 'and the sea' – LXX^{Rahlfs} Brenton ABP
et mare,, 'and [the] sea,' – Vg^{Colunga&Turrado}
omitted – LXX^{Swete}

Compare Deuteronomy 5:15 (an entirely different sentence in all witnesses, which supports Sabbath observance by reference to the Exodus rather than the Genesis creation narrative).

Exodus 20:11, see also Remember the sabbath day, to keep it holy

עַל־כֵּ֗ן בֵּרַ֧ךְ יְהוָ֛ה אֶת־יֹ֥ום הַשַּׁבָּ֖ת, ‘al- kên, bê-raḵ Yah-weh ’eṯ- yō-wm haš-šab-bāṯ, 'Therefore, Yahweh blessed the Sabbath day' – WLC.

The noun H7676 שַׁבָּת shabbath "Sabbath" (Greek: G4521 σάββατον) is derived from, but independent of, the adjective H7637 שְׁבִיעִי šə-ḇî-‘î "seventh" (Greek: G1442 ἕβδομος/ἕβδομη, see hebdo-) earlier in this verse. See Biblical Sabbath § Etymology.

διὰ τοῦτο εὐλόγησεν Κύριος τὴν ἡμέραν τὴν ἑβδόμην, 'Because of this, [the] Lord blessed the seventh day' – LXX^{Swete} LXX^{Rahlfs} Brenton ABP
idcirco benedixit Dominus diei sabbati,, 'therefore [the] Lord blessed [the] day of Sabbath,' – Vg^{Colunga&Turrado}

Compare Deuteronomy 5:15 (an entirely different sentence in all witnesses, which supports Sabbath observance by reference to the Exodus rather than the Genesis creation narrative).

Exodus 20:12, see also Honour thy father and thy mother

ίνα ευ σοι γένηται, 'in order that good [things] should happen to you' – LXX^{Swete} LXX^{Rahlfs} Brenton ABP
omitted – WLC Vg^{Colunga&Turrado}

Compare Deuteronomy 5:16 (where this phrase is identical in Greek witnesses, and not omitted in Hebrew and Latin witnesses, albeit phrased slightly differently from Greek).

Exodus 20:13–15, see also Thou shalt not kill, Thou shalt not commit adultery and Thou shalt not steal

לֹ֥֖א תִּֿרְצָֽח׃ ס לֹ֖֣א תִּֿנְאָֽ֑ף׃ ס לֹ֣֖א תִּֿגְנֹֽ֔ב׃ ס, lō trə-ṣāḥ. s lō tnə-’āp̄. s lō tḡə-nōḇ. s, '[You] shall not murder. [You] shall not commit adultery. [You] shall not steal.' – MT WLC SP
לוא תנאף׃ ס לוא תרצח׃ ס לוא תִּֿגְנֹֽ֔ב׃ ס, wə-lō tnə-’āp̄. s wə-lō trə-ṣāḥ. s wə-lō tḡə-nōḇ. s, 'And [you] shall not commit adultery. And [you] shall not murder. And [you] shall not steal.' – Pap^{Nash}
Οὐ μοιχεύσεις. Οὐ κλέψεις. Οὐ φονεύσεις., '[You] shall not commit adultery. [You] shall not steal. [You] shall not murder.' – LXX^{Swete} LXX^{Rahlfs} Brenton
Οὐ φονεύσεις. Οὐ μοιχεύσεις. Οὐ κλέψεις., '[You] shall not murder. [You] shall not commit adultery. [You] shall not steal.' – ABP

The verb κλέπτω ("to steal") is at the root of modern English words such as kleptomania and kleptocracy.

Non occides. Non moechaberis. Non furtum facies., '[You] shall not kill/slay. [You] shall not commit adultery. [You] shall not commit theft.' – Vg^{Colunga&Turrado}

Compare Deuteronomy 5:17–19.

Exodus 20:16, see also Thou shalt not bear false witness against thy neighbour

לֹֽא־תַעֲנֶ֥ה בְרֵעֲךָ֖ עֵ֥ד שָֽׁקֶר׃ ס, lō-ṯa-‘ă-neh ḇə-rê-‘ă-ḵā šā-qer., 'You shall not answer/respond false/lying witness/evidence against your neighbour' – WLC
Οὐ ψευδομαρτυρήσεις κατὰ τοῦ πλησίον σου μαρτυρίαν ψευδῆ., 'You shall not witness falsely against your neighbour [as a] lying witness' – LXX^{Swete} LXX^{Rahlfs} Brenton ABP
Non loqueris contra proximum tuum falsum testimonium., '[You] do/shall not speak/declare false testimony against your neighbour.' – Vg^{Colunga&Turrado}

Exodus 20:17, see also Thou shalt not covet

לֹ֥א תַחְמֹ֖ד בֵּ֣ית רֵעֶ֑ךָ לֹֽא־תַחְמֹ֞ד אֵ֣שֶׁת רֵעֶ֗ךָ, lō ṯaḥ-mōḏ bêṯ rê-‘e-ḵā; lō-ṯaḥ-mōḏ ’ê-šeṯ rê-‘e-ḵā,, 'You shall not covet the house of your neighbour. You shall not covet the wife of your neighbour' – WLC
Οὐκ ἐπιθυμήσεις τὴν γυναῖκα τοῦ πλησίον σου· οὐκ ἐπιθυμήσεις τὴν οἰκίαν τοῦ πλησίον σου οὔτε τὸν ἀγρὸν αὐτοῦ, 'You shall not covet the woman/wife of your neighbour. You shall not covet the house of your neighbour, nor his field,' – LXX^{Swete} LXX^{Rahlfs} Brenton
Οὐκ ἐπιθυμήσεις τὴν γυναῖκα τοῦ πλησίον σου· οὐκ ἐπιθυμήσεις τὴν οἰκίαν τοῦ πλησίον σου ουδέ τὸν ἀγρὸν αὐτοῦ, 'You shall not covet the woman/wife of your neighbour. You shall not covet the house of your neighbour, nor his field,' – ABP
Non concupisces domum proximi tui, nec desiderabis uxorem ejus,, '[You] shall not covet [the] house of your neighbour, nor shall [you] desire his wife,' – Vg^{Colunga&Turrado}

concupīscō is derived from (con)cupiō ("I desire"), the origin of the English verb "to covet" and the name of the Roman god Cupid.

Exodus 20:17, see also Thou shalt not covet

ούτε παντός κτήνους αυτού, 'nor any of his cattle/beasts [of burden]' – LXX^{Swete} LXX^{Rahlfs} Brenton ABP
omitted – WLC Vg^{Colunga&Turrado}

Exodus 20:18

וְכָל־, wə-ḵāl, 'And all' – WLC
Καὶ πᾶς, 'And all' – LXX^{Swete} LXX^{Rahlfs} Brenton
πας, 'All' – ABP
Cunctus autem, 'But/and all' – Vg^{Colunga&Turrado}

Exodus 20:18

הַקֹּולֹ֜ת וְאֶת־הַלַּפִּידִ֗ם, haq-qō-w-lōṯ ’eṯ-hal-lap-pî-ḏim,, 'the voices/sounds/noises/thunders and the torches' – WLC
την φωνήν και τας λαμπάδας, 'the voice/sound and the torches/lamps/lanterns' – LXX^{Swete} LXX^{Rahlfs} Brenton ABP. φωνή and λᾰμπᾰ́ς are the origins of the English words phone and lamp respectively.
voces et lampades, '(the) voices and (the) torches/lamps/lanterns' – Vg^{Colunga&Turrado}. vōx is the root of the English word voice.

Compare Exodus 19:16

Exodus 20:19

פֶּן־, pen-, 'lest/or' – WLC
μὴ, 'not' – LXX^{Swete} Brenton
μήποτε, 'lest/otherwise' – LXX^{Rahlfs} ABP
ne forte, 'lest' – Vg^{Colunga&Turrado}

Exodus 20:20

Μωσῆς, 'Moses' – LXX^{Swete}
Μωυσῆς, 'Moses' – LXX^{Rahlfs} Brenton ABP

Exodus 20:21

ἱστήκει δὲ ὁ λαὸς, 'And the people stood' – LXX^{Swete}
εἱστήκει δὲ ὁ λαὸς, 'And the people stood' – LXX^{Rahlfs} Brenton
εἱστήκει δὲ πας ὁ λαὸς, 'And all the people stood' – ABP

Exodus 20:23

תעשון, ṯa-‘ă-śūn, '[you] have made or [you] shall make' – MT WLC
תעשו, ta-asú, '[you] have made' – SP

Exodus 20:23

אִתִּ֑י...לָכֶֽם׃, ’it-tî...lā-ḵem., 'against me... for yourselves.' – WLC
ὑμῖν αὐτοῖς...ὑμῖν ἑαυτοῖς, 'to you to/for yourselves...to you to/for each other' – LXX^{Swete}
ὑμῖν αὐτοῖς...ὑμῖν αυτοῖς, 'to you to/for yourselves...to you to/for yourselves' – Brenton
εαυτοίς...υμίν αυτοίς, 'for each other...to you to/for yourselves' – LXX^{Rahlfs} ABP
[omitted]....vobis, 'to/for you' – Vg^{Colunga&Turrado}

Exodus 20:26

אֲשֶׁ֛ר לֹֽא־תִגָּלֶ֥ה עֶרְוָתְךָ֖, ’ă-šer lō- ṯig-gā-leh ‘er-wā-ṯə-ḵā, 'so (that) your nakedness may not be uncovered' – WLC
ὅπως ἂν μὴ ἀποκαλύψῃς τὴν ἀσχημοσύνην σου, 'so that [you] should/will not uncover/reveal your nakedness/indecency/shame' – LXX^{Swete} LXX^{Rahlfs} Brenton ABP

ἀποκαλύψῃς is likely a misspelling of the verb ἀποκαλύψεις. The noun αποκάλυψη is the root of words such as apocalypse, apocalyptic and apocalypticism.

ne reveletur turpitudo tua., 'lest your unsightliness/indecency/shame should be revealed.' – Vg^{Colunga&Turrado}

Compare Leviticus 18.

=== Exodus 21 ===
Exodus 21:17 (LXX 21:16)

וּמְקַלֵּ֥ל אָבִ֛יו וְאִמֹּ֖ו מֹ֥ות יוּמָֽת׃ ס, ū-mə-qal-lêl ’ā-ḇîw wə-’im-mōw mō-wṯ yū-māṯ. s, 'And he who curses his father or his mother surely shall be put to death.' – MT
Ὁ κακολογῶν πατέρα αὐτοῦ ἢ μητέρα αὐτοῦ τελευτήσει θανάτῳ., 'He that speaks evil of his father or his mother must end in death.' – LXX^{Swete} Brenton
Ὁ κακολογῶν πατέρα αὐτοῦ ἢ μητέρα αὐτοῦ θανάτῳ τελευτάτω., 'He that speaks evil of his father or his mother in death let him end.' – ABP
Qui maledixerit patri suo, vel matri, morte moriatur., 'Who[ever] speaks evil of his father, or mother, let [him] die by death.' – Vg^{Clement} Vg^{Colunga&Turrado}

Compare New Testament quotation:
Ὁ κακολογῶν πατέρα ἢ μητέρα θανάτῳ τελευτάτω., 'He that speaks evil of father or mother in death let him end.' – Mark 7:10
Compare Deuteronomy 21:18–21.

=== Exodus 32 ===
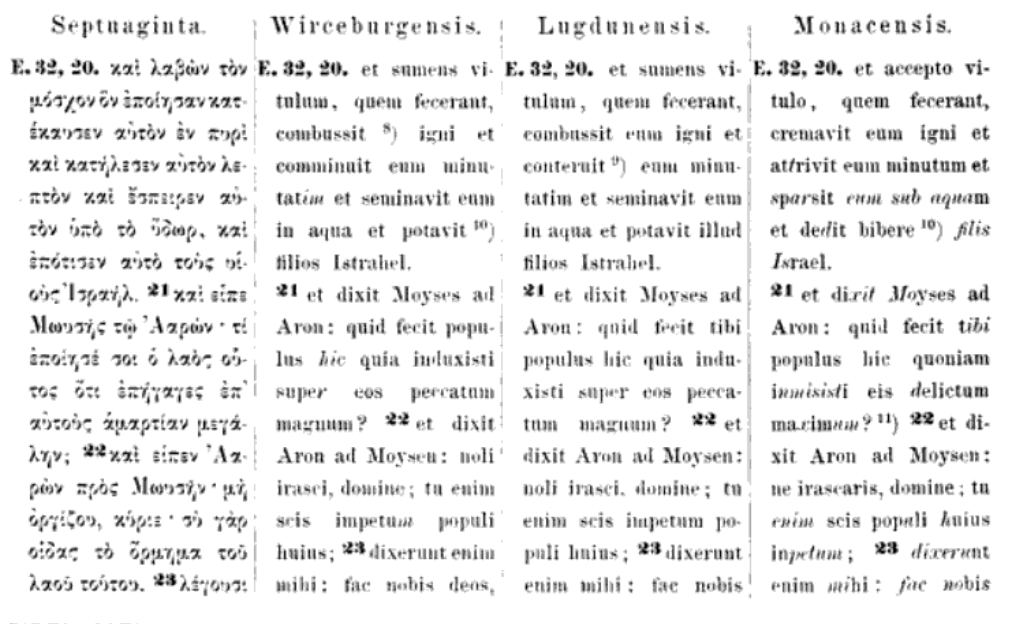
Ziegler (1883) comparing three different Vetus Latina manuscripts (W, L, M) of Exodus 32 with the Septuagint (LXX)

=== Exodus 34 ===
Exodus 34:11

אֶת־הָאֱמֹרִי֙ וְהַֽכְּנַעֲנִ֔י וְהַחִתִּי֙ וְהַפְּרִזִּ֔י וְהַחִוִּ֖י וְהַיְבוּסִֽי׃, ’eṯ- hā-’ĕ-mō-rî wə-hak-kə-na-‘ă-nî, wə-ha-ḥit-tî wə-hap-pə-riz-zî, wə-ha-ḥiw-wî wə-hay-ḇū-sî., 'the Amorite and the Canaanite and the Hittite and the Perizzite and the Hivite and the Jebusite.' – WLC
τὸν Ἀμορραῖον καὶ Χαναναῖον καὶ Φερεζαῖον καὶ Χετταῖον καὶ Εὑαῖον καὶ Γεργεσαῖον καὶ Ἰεβουσαῖον·, 'the Amorite and Canaanite and Perizzite and Hittite and Hivite and Gergesite and Jebusite;' – LXX^{Swete}
τὸν Αμορραῖον καὶ Χαναναῖον καὶ Χετταῖον καὶ Φερεζαῖον καὶ Ευαῖον καὶ Γεργεσαῖον καὶ Ιεβουσαῖον·, 'the Amorite and Canaanite and Hittite and Perizzite and Hivite and Gergesite and Jebusite;' – LXX^{Rahlfs} Brenton
τὸν Αμορραῖον καὶ τὸν Χαναναῖον καὶ τὸν Χετταῖον καὶ τὸν Φερεζαῖον καὶ τὸν Ευαῖον καὶ τὸν Γεργεσαῖον καὶ τὸν Ιεβουσαῖον·, 'the Amorite and the Canaanite and the Hittite and the Perizzite and the Hivite and the Gergesite and the Jebusite;' – ABP
Amorrhaeum, et Chananaeum, et Hethaeum, Pherezaeum quoque, et Hevaeum, et Jebusaeum., '[the] Amorite, and (the) Canaanite, and (the) Hittite, (the) Perizzite too, and (the) Hivite, and (the) Jebusite.' – Vg^{Colunga&Turrado}

Exodus 34:14, see also Thou shalt have no other gods before me

כִּ֛י לֹ֥א תִֽשְׁתַּחֲוֶ֖ה לְאֵ֣ל אַחֵ֑ר כִּ֤י יְהוָה֙ קַנָּ֣א שְׁמֹ֔ו אֵ֥ל קַנָּ֖א הֽוּא׃, 'For you shall not worship any other god, for Yahweh, whose name [is] Jealous, is a jealous god.' – WLC
οὐ γὰρ μὴ προσκυνήσητε θεοῖς ἑτέροις· ὁ γὰρ Κύριος ὁ θεὸς ζηλωτὸν ὄνομα, θεὸς ζηλωτής ἐστι(ν)., 'For [you] should not revere other gods: for Lord the god [has?] [a] zealot-name, [the] god is [a] zealot. or for the Lord God, a jealous name, is a jealous God.' – LXX^{Swete} Brenton
οὐ γὰρ μὴ προσκυνήσητε θεῷ ἑτέρῳ· ὁ γὰρ κύριος ὁ θεὸς ζηλωτὸν ὄνομα, θεὸς ζηλωτής ἐστι(ν)., 'For [you] should not revere another god: for lord the god [has?] [a] zealot-name, [the] god is [a] zealot or for lord the god [has] [the] name "zealot", the god is [a] zealot.' – LXX^{Rahlfs} ABP
noli adorare deum alienum. Dominus zelotes nomen ejus; Deus est aemulator., 'Do not adore alien/foreign/strange gods. Lord zealot [is] his name; God is (an) emulator/rival.' – Vg^{Colunga&Turrado}

Compare Exodus 20:3 and Deuteronomy 5:7,9.

Exodus 34:17, see also Thou shalt not make unto thee any graven image

אֱלֹהֵ֥י מַסֵּכָ֖ה לֹ֥א תַעֲשֶׂה־לָּֽךְ׃, ’ĕ-lō-hê mas-sê-ḵāh lō ṯa-‘ă-śeh- lāḵ., '[You] shall not make molten gods to/for you(rself).' – WLC
καὶ θεοὺς χωνευτοὺς οὐ ποιήσεις σεαυτῷ., 'And you shall not make molten gods to/for yourself.' – LXX^{Swete} LXX^{Rahlfs} Brenton ABP
Deos conflatiles non facies tibi., 'You shall not make cast/molten gods to/for you.' – Vg^{Colunga&Turrado}

Compare Exodus 20:5 and Deuteronomy 5:8.

== See also ==
- List of Hebrew Bible manuscripts
- Septuagint manuscripts
- Vetus Latina § Old Testament manuscripts
- Vulgate manuscripts

== Bibliography ==
- Biblos.com & Helps Ministries (2011–2018). "Interlinear Bible (Westminster Leningrad Codex – English)". Biblehub.com.
- Brenton, Lancelot Charles Lee (1851). "Brenton's Septuagint Translation". Biblehub.com.
- Brenton, Lancelot Charles Lee (1879). The Septuagint version of the OT, with an English translation (PDF). London: Samuel Bagster. p. 1156.
- Everson, David L. (2014). "The Vetus Latina and the Vulgate of the Book of Exodus". The Book of Exodus: Composition, Reception, and Interpretation. Leiden: Brill. pp. 370–386. ISBN 978-90-04-28266-7.
- Rahlfs, Alfred (1935). "Έξοδος (Exodus Rahlfs)". Alfred Rahlfs' edition of the Septuagint (in Greek). Greek Wikisource.
- Scholz, Susanne (2021). Sacred Witness. Rape in the Hebrew Bible. Fortress Press. ISBN 9781506482033. (E-book edition)
- Swete, Henry Barclay (1930). "Swete's Septuagint". Biblehub.com.
- Emanuel Tov, The Text-Critical Use of the Septuagint in Biblical Research (TCU), 1981 (1st edition), 1997 (2nd edition), 2015 (3rd edition).
- Emanuel Tov, Textual Criticism of the Hebrew Bible (TCHB), 1992 (1st edition), 2001 (2nd edition), 2012 (3rd edition).
- Emanuel Tov, Textual Criticism of the Hebrew Bible, Qumran, Septuagint: Collected Writings, Volume 3 (2015).
- Tov, Emanuel (1999). "38. The Septuagint Additions ('Miscellanies') in 1 Kings 2 (3 Reigns 2)". The Greek and Hebrew Bible: Collected Essays on the Septuagint. Vetus Testamentum Supplements. Vol. 72. Leiden: Brill. doi:10.1163/9789004275973_039. ISBN 9789004275973.
- van de Giessen, J. P. (2003). "Index Bijbelverzen". bijbelaantekeningen.nl (in Dutch).
- Van der Pool, Charles (1996). "Apostolic Bible Polyglot (ABP)". Biblehub.com.
