= Liubech =

Rural locality in Chernihiv Oblast, Ukraine

Liubech Любеч
- Rural settlement
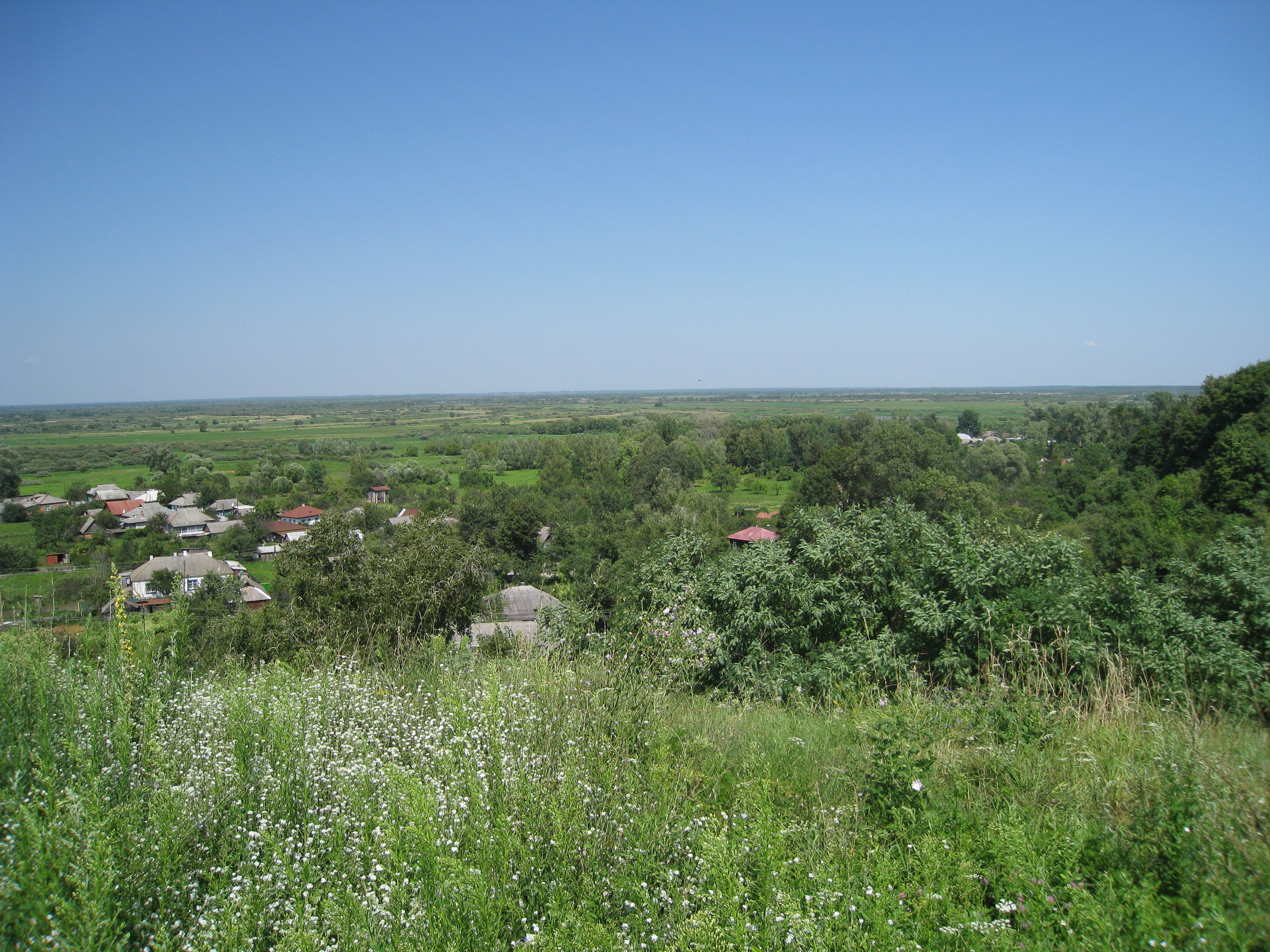
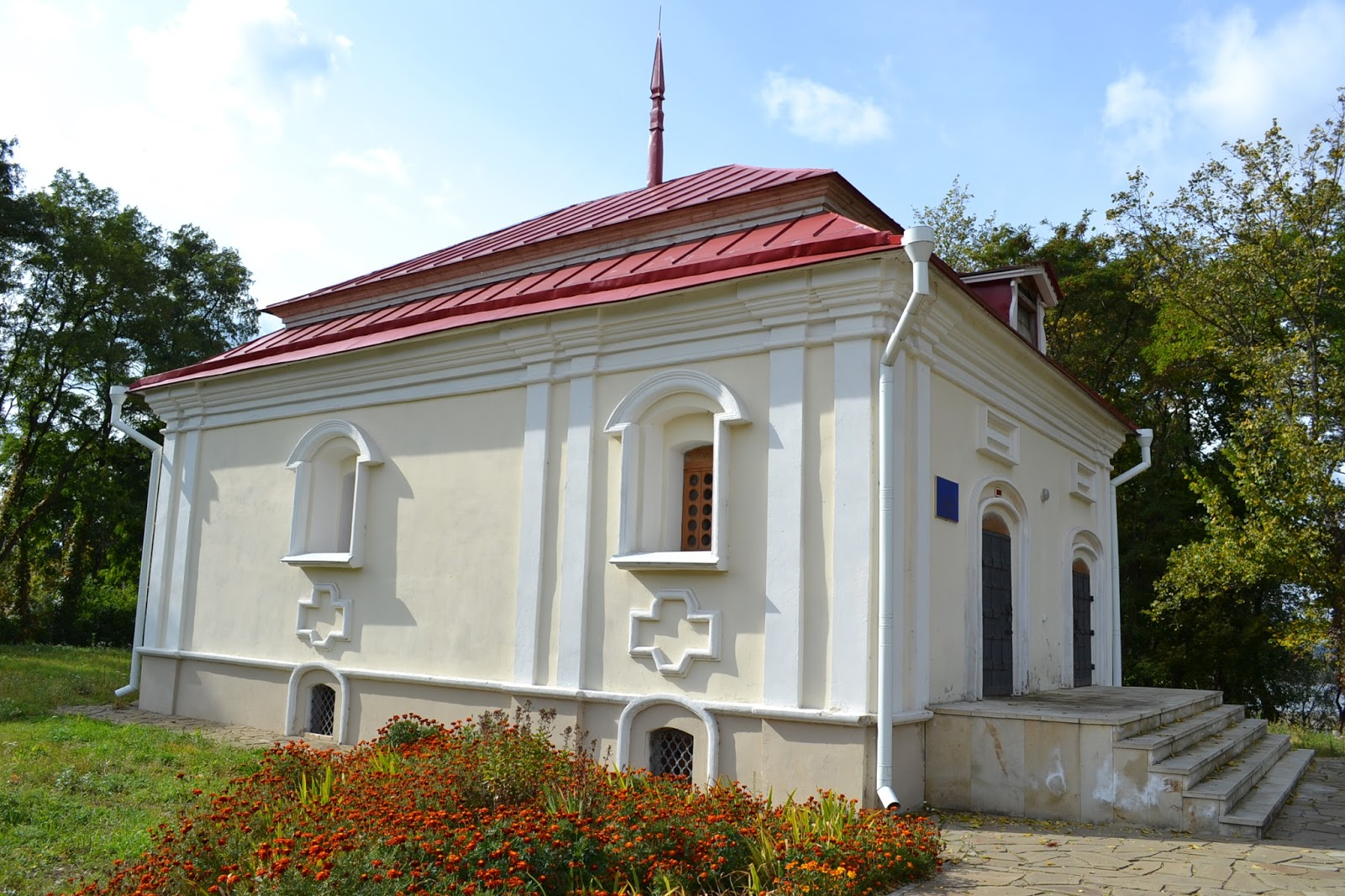
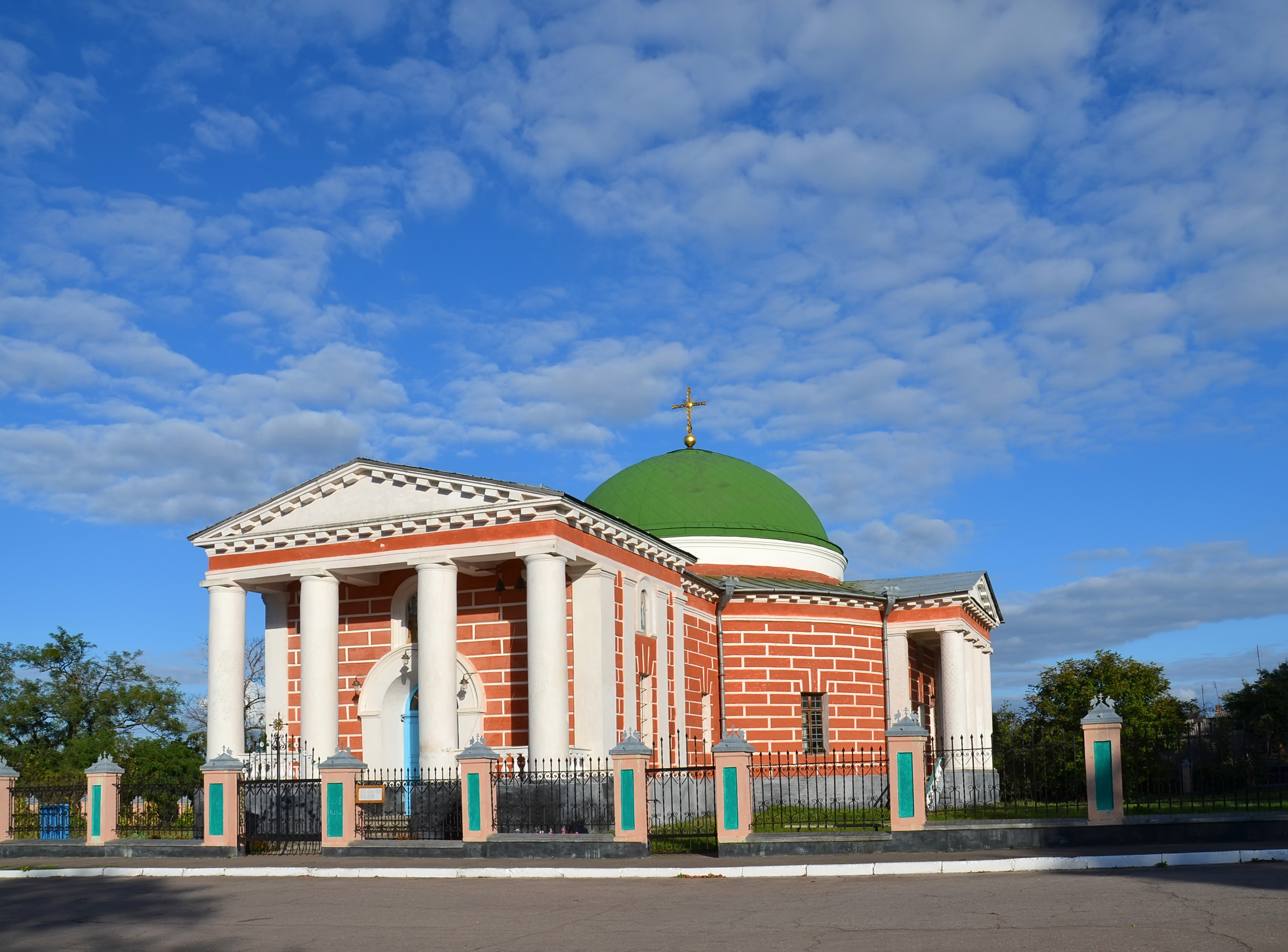
- View of Liubech from the hill of Liubech Citadel Polubotok's House Transfiguration Church

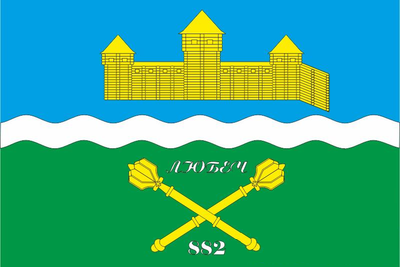
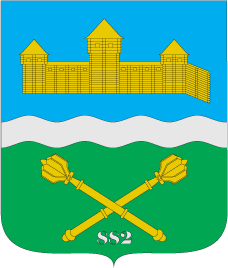
- Flag Coat of arms

- Location of Liubech in Ukraine Liubech (Ukraine)
- Coordinates: 51°42′18.8″N 30°39′42″E
- Country: Ukraine
- Oblast: Chernihiv Oblast
- Raion: Chernihiv Raion
- Hromada: Liubech settlement hromada
- First mentioned: 882

Area
  - Total: 6 km^{2} (2.3 sq mi)

Population (2022)
  - Total: 1,890

Liubech (Note: Alternative transcriptions in English include Lyubech and Lyubeč.) (Ukrainian, Belarusian and Russian: Любеч; Polish: Lubecz) is a rural settlement in Chernihiv Oblast, northern Ukraine. Liubech is located 200 kilometers (120 mi) north of the capital of Ukraine, Kyiv, and located near the border with Belarus. It hosts the administration of Liubech settlement hromada, one of the hromadas of Ukraine. Population: 1,890 (2022 estimate).

First mentioned in 882, Liubech later became a town in the Principality of Chernigov.

== History ==
Liubech was first mentioned in 882 when it was captured by Oleg of Novgorod. In 1016 there was a great battle between the army of the Grand Prince of Kiev Sviatopolk the Accursed and the Prince of Novgorod Yaroslav the Wise who was rushing to seize power in the whole Rus'. In 1097 the Council of Liubech, also known as the Congress of Rus' Princes, was held here. It was initiated by Vladimir II Monomakh and divided the land of the Kievan Rus' between the princes.

In the 14th century, Liubech became part of the Grand Duchy of Lithuania. During the negotiations on the Union of Lublin (1569) King Sigismund II Augustus transferred it to Poland. In 1632, Polish King Sigismund III Vasa granted Lubecz city rights. It was a royal city of Poland. From 1635 to 1667 it was part of the Chernihiv Voivodeship of the Lesser Poland Province of the Polish Crown.

St. Anthony of the Caves (Anthony of Kiev) also known as Antony Pechersky, was born in Liubech in 983. He established the first Ukrainian monastery known now as Kyiv Pechersk Lavra, and is considered to be the father of East Slavic monasticism.

Until 18 July 2020, Liubech belonged to Ripky Raion. The raion was abolished in July 2020 as part of the administrative reform of Ukraine, which reduced the number of raions of Chernihiv Oblast to five. The area of Ripky Raion was merged into Chernihiv Raion.

Until 26 January 2024, Liubech was designated urban-type settlement. On this day, a new law entered into force which abolished this status, and Liubech became a rural settlement.
