= Nash Papyrus =

Jewish Hebrew manuscript

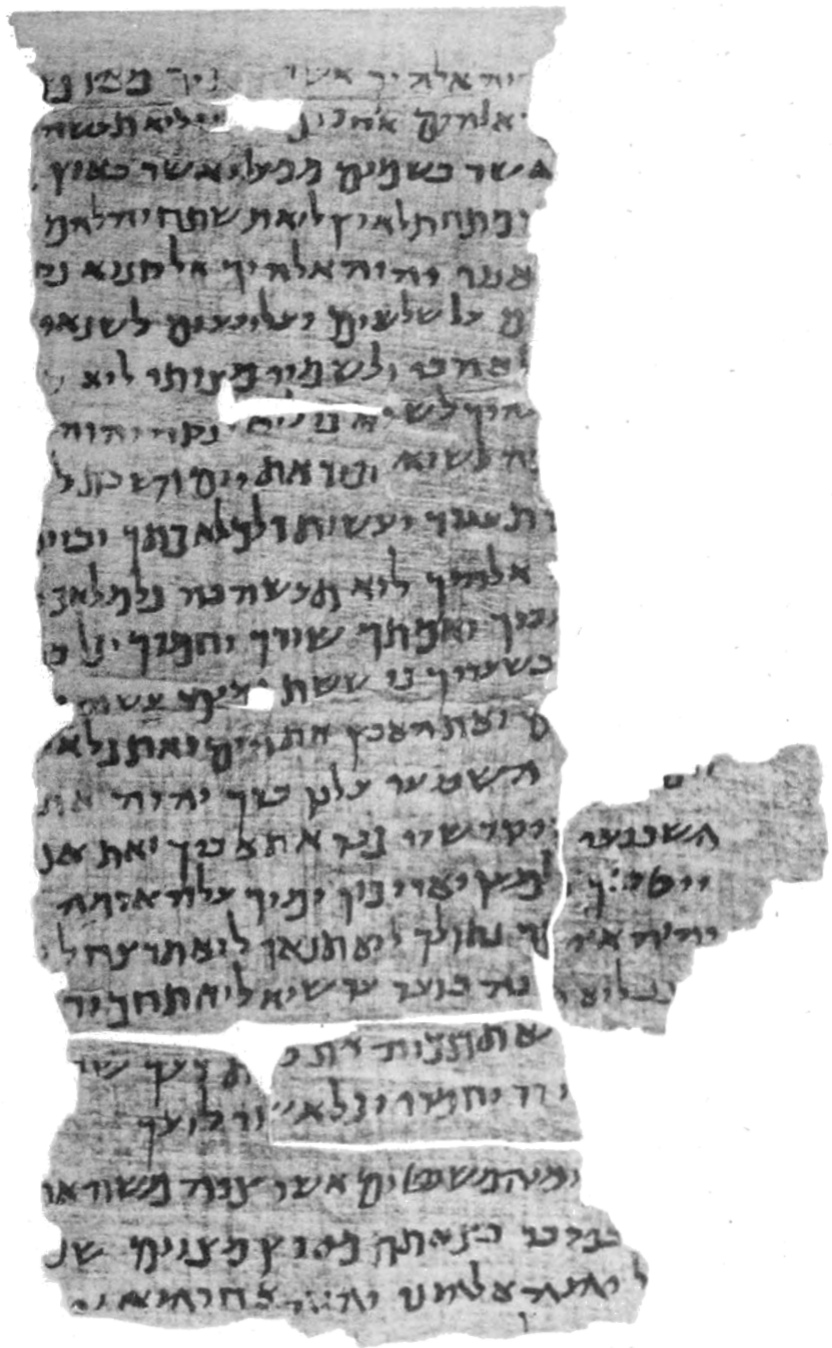
Nash papyrus

The Nash Papyrus is a collection of four papyrus fragments acquired in Egypt in 1902, inscribed with a Hebrew text which mainly contains the Ten Commandments and the first part of the Shema Yisrael prayer, in a form that differs substantially from the later, canonical Masoretic Text and is in parts more similar to the chronologically closer Septuagint. It has been suggested that the text might have been the daily worship of a Jew living in Egypt at the time. The fragments comprise a single sheet and are not part of a scroll. The papyrus is of unknown provenance, although it is allegedly from Fayyum. The text was first described by Stanley A. Cook in 1903. Though dated by Cook to the 2nd century CE, subsequent reappraisals have pushed the date of the fragments back to about 150–100 BCE. The papyrus was by far the oldest Hebrew manuscript fragment known at that time, before the discovery of the Dead Sea Scrolls in 1947.

== Discovery ==
The papyrus fragments were acquired by W. L. Nash, the secretary of the Society of Biblical Archaeology. He presented them to Cambridge University Library in 1903.

== Contents ==
Twenty-four lines long, with a few letters missing at each edge, the papyrus contains the Ten Commandments in Hebrew and a short middle text, followed by the start of the Shema Yisrael prayer. The text of the Ten Commandments combines parts of the version from Exodus 20:2–17 with parts from Deuteronomy 5:6–21. A curiosity is its omission of the phrase "house of bondage", used in both versions, about Egypt – perhaps a reflection of where the papyrus was composed.

== Textual basis ==
Some (but not all) of the papyrus' substitutions from Deuteronomy are also found in the version of Exodus in the Septuagint, a Greek translation of the Pentateuch from the 3rd–2nd centuries BCE, made in Alexandria. The Septuagint also interpolates before Deuteronomy 6:4 the preamble to the Shema found in the papyrus, and the Septuagint also agrees with a couple of the other variant readings where the papyrus departs from the standard Hebrew Masoretic text. The ordering of the later commandments in the papyrus (Adultery–Murder–Steal, rather than Murder–Adultery–Steal) is also that found in most texts of the Septuagint.

The papyrus preamble before Shema Yisrael, also found in the Septuagint, is taken from Deuteronomy 4:45, which is the only time the recurring formula "This is the commandment(s) and rules and teachings..." mentions the Exodus from Egypt. The Nash preamble correctly cites Moses as the speaker rather than God as in the Septuagint. The insertion of Deuteronomy 4:45 before Shema Yisrael in the papyrus and especially the Septuagint, which has two preambles in the same section: Deuteronomy 6:1 and the interpolation to Deuteronomy 6:3, was probably done to distance the central Shema Yisrael prayer from its context: sections dealing with the entry to the Promised Land of Canaan.

== Likely use ==
According to the Talmud it was once customary to read the Ten Commandments before saying the Shema. As Burkitt put it, "it is therefore reasonable to conjecture that this Papyrus contains the daily worship of a pious Egyptian Jew, who lived before the custom came to an end". It is thus believed that the papyrus probably consisted of a liturgical document, specifically the constituents of a Phylactery, which may have purposely synthesised the two versions of the Commandments, rather than directly from Scripture. However, the papyrus' similarities with the Septuagint, support a possibility that a Hebrew text of the Pentateuch was in circulation in Egypt in the 2nd century BCE, and served both the Nash papyrus and the Septuagint translation as source, but which differs significantly from the modern Jewish Masoretic Text.

== Actual location ==
Currently the manuscript is in the Cambridge University Library (MS Or.233).

== See also ==
- List of Hebrew Bible manuscripts
