= Galician–Volhynian Chronicle =

1201–1292 Old Ruthenian historiographical work

Beginning of the GVC in the Hypatian Codex (л.245; click for full PDF)

Boundary between the Galician and Volhynian part in the Khlebnikov Codex (page 719, just after "П"; click for full PDF)

The Galician–Volhynian Chronicle (GVC) (Ukrainian: Галицько-Волинський літопис, romanized: Halycjko-Volynsjkyj litopys, called "Halicz-Wolyn Chronicle" in Polish historiography), also known as Chronicle of Halych–Volhynia and by other names (Note: Such as The Dynastic Chronicle of the Romanovichi, or the Princely Chronicle of Galicia (abbreviated Princely Chronicle or Chronicle of Galicia), with the segment from 1246 to 1262 dubbed the Chronicle of Daniil for its focus on Daniel (Danylo, Daniil) of Galicia.) is a prominent work of Old Ruthenian literature and historiography covering 1201–1292 in the history of the Principality of Galicia–Volhynia (in modern Ukraine).

== Textual witnesses ==
The original chronicle completed in the late 13th century did not survive. The oldest known copy is part of the early 15th-century Hypatian Codex, discovered in the Hypatian Monastery of Kostroma by the Russian historian and essayist Nikolay Karamzin. He also found the second codex of the Galician–Volhynian Chronicle, the 16th-century Khlebnikov Codex (which is considered the principal one).

In 1973, five copies were known: Hypatian (Ipatiev), Khlebnikov (X), Pogodin (P), Cracow (C), and Ermolaev (E). As of 2022, seven codices/manuscripts that have been preserved are known to contain a paper copy of the Galician–Volhynian Chronicle.

- Hypatian Codex (c. 1425) – contains a faulty chronology inserted by a later copyist
- Khlebnikov Codex (c. 1575) / Ostroz'kyj – contains no chronology
- Pogodin/Chetvertyns'kyj text – contains no chronology
- Cracow text (late 18th century in Latin script) – poorly copied from the Pogodin text
- Bundur/Iarocki text
- Ermolaev (Yermolayev) text – similar to Khlebnikov, but greatly abbreviated and distorted

According to Raffensperger & Ostrowski (2023), there were only four copies of the GVC; only the Hypatian and Khlebnikov were independent of each other, while the other two derived from Khlebnikov.

== Contents ==
The Galician–Volhynian Chronicle has two parts:

- The Galician section (1201–1260)
- The Volynian section (1261–1292)

The compiler of the Galician–Volhynian Chronicle explained Galicia's claim to the Principality of Kiev. The first part of the chronicle (Daniel of Galicia chronicle) was written in Kholm, possibly by a boyar named Dionisiy Pavlovich. Several scholars think that the entire GVC could have been written by eleven unique authors, after which it was compiled together into a single text.

There is some disagreement between scholars where the Kievan Chronicle ends and the Galician–Volhynian Chronicle begins, as the texts themselves provide no such indication. Ultimately, the boundary between the two is somewhat arbitrary.

== Studies and translations ==
Galician–Volhynian Chronicle (in Ukrainian Cyrillic script), 2002 critical edition by Mykola Kotlyar (click for full djvu)

=== 19th century ===
While the 1843, 1908 and 1962 editions of the GVC published in the Complete Collection of Russian Chronicles (PSRL) and the 1871 Archaeographical Commission edition were still primarily based on the Hypatian text and only included Khlebnikov for variant readings, A. Klevanov's 1871 Russian paraphrase was the first work – albeit a very flawed one – to take the Khlebnikov text as the foundation for reconstructing the GVC. The first linguistic studies of the entire Hypatian Codex were published by Makarushka (1896) and Nikolskij (1899). Compared to the Primary Chronicle and Kievan Chronicle, relatively little attention was given to the Galician–Volhynian Chronicle until the 1890s, when Ukrainian historian Mykhailo Hrushevsky stimulated historical and literary interest in it. Hrushevsky established the first reliable chronology of events in the GVC. He demonstrated that the faulty chronology found in the Hypatian GVC text was inserted by a later copyist. Although it was clear that the original author had intended to write his text in imitation of the events-based – rather than years-based (annalistic) – Greek chronographs, he never got around to dating the events he had been writing about, and so a later copyist inserted dates, albeit incorrectly. In addition, Hrushevsky translated certain passages from it with historical and literary commentary.

=== 20th century ===
Panov published a modern Russian translation of the Galician–Volhynian Chronicle in 1936, which according to Daniel Clarke Waugh (1974) contained "occasional blunders". Waugh suggested that Teofil Kostrub's modern Ukrainian translation, also released in 1936, was "more faithful to the original" than the English one produced by Perfecky in 1973.

The first English translation of the Galician–Volhynian Chronicle was published with an index and annotations by La Salle professor George A. Perfecky in 1973. It was part of a large-scale project to produce critical editions of the entire Hypatian Codex in modern English under the guidance of professor Omeljan Pritsak (who founded the Harvard Ukrainian Research Institute that same year). Perfecky sought to establish a "free (but faithful) rather than a literal interpretation of the chronicle." Pritsak cautioned the reader "that these are pioneer steps toward a comprehensive study of this work", and that a revised edition would be prepared "upon the completion of the whole project, which is estimated to take at least ten years". Waugh reviewed this edition, pointing out some flaws in translation, saying it "will need revision", and suggesting "that its publication was a bit premature."

=== 21st century ===
In 2006, Bulgarian historical linguist Daniela S. Hristova (1962–2010) demonstrated that there was a clear linguistic and stylistic boundary in the middle of column 848, between the end of the entry for the year 1260 (6768) and the year 1261 (6769). She concluded that this was where the Galician part ended, and the Volhynian part began. Hristova and other scholars (Orlov, Gensiorsky, Worth, Yurieva) discovered that the Galician part is written in Byzantine chronographic style and full of Church Slavonic expressions, while the Volhynian part imitates the style and Chancery Slavonic (Ruthenian) language of other Rus'/Ruthenian chronicles such as the Kyivan Chronicle. She and Petro Tolochko (2003) also supported the hypothesis of Mykola F. Kotlyar (1993) that the Galician part consisted of six different narratives by separate authors, and that the Volhynian part compiled five different narratives into one, so that the whole GVC was probably written by eleven different people.

From 2014 to 2020, a project team from the NASU Centre for Kyivan Rus’ Studies, led by Oleksiy Tolochko, conducted the most elaborate text-critical research on the GVC to date, publishing their results in The Galician-Volhynian Chronicle: A Text-Critical Inquiry (2021). In the meantime, Polish genealogists Dariusz Dąbrowski and Adrian Jusupović prepared the first modern Polish translation of the GVC (Kraków 2017). In 2023, Dąbrowski wrote a critique of the Text-Critical Inquiry, asserting that the editorial team tried "to prove a preconceived thesis", namely inter alia that the 'Galician' part was not composed until after 1264, and the 'Volhynian' part was not begun until the late 1280s and early 1290s, contrary to traditional historiographical views. Tolochko responded (2025) by explaining differences in approach between genealogy and textual criticism, and that the GVC is a very complex text with errors, editing and embellishments that cannot be taken at face value, but ought to be critically analysed, recognising that previous interpretations might be wrong and in need of adjustment in the light of new evidence.

== Bibliography ==
=== Primary sources ===
Critical editions

- Kotlyar, Mykola (2002). Halycʹko-Volynsʹkyj litopys: doslidžennja, tekst, komentar Галицько-волинський літопис. Дослідження. Текст. Коментар [The Galician–Volhynian Chronicle. Research. Text. Commentary] (in Ukrainian). Kyiv: Naukova Dumka. p. 394. ISBN 966-00-0780-9.
- Shakhmatov, Aleksey Aleksandrovich, ed. (1908). Галицко-Волынскій сводъ [The Galician–Volhynian Codex]. Complete Collection of Rus' Chronicles (PSRL) (in Church Slavic). Vol. 2 (3rd ed.). Saint Petersburg: Typography of M. A. Aleksandrov / Izbornyk. pp. 715–938.

Translations

- Perfecky, George A. (1973). The Hypatian Codex Part Two: The Galician–Volynian Chronicle. An annotated translation by George A. Perfecky. Harvard Series in Ukrainian Studies. Munich: Wilhelm Fink Verlag. OCLC 902306. – 1973 English translation, introduction and commentary
  - Waugh, Daniel Clarke (Dec 1974). "Review". Slavic Review. 33 (4): 769–771. doi:10.2307/2494516. JSTOR 2494516. S2CID 163559666. – review of Perfecky's 1973 English translation
- Makhnovets, Leonid (1989). Літопис Руський за Іпатським списком : Галицько-Волинський літопис [Rus' Chronicle according to the Hypatian Codex : Galician–Volhynian Chronicle] (in Ukrainian). Kyiv: Dnipro. p. 591. ISBN 5-308-00052-2. — A modern annotated Ukrainian translation of the Galician–Volhynian Chronicle, based on the Hypatian Codex with comments from the Khlebnikov Codex.
- Dąbrowski, Dariusz; Jusupović, Adrian, eds. (2017). Kronika halicko-wołyńska: Kronika Romanowiczów (PDF). Monumenta Poloniae Historica (in Polish). Kraków & Warsaw: Tadeusz Manteuffel Institute of History of the Polish Academy of Sciences. p. 842. ISBN 978-83-7676-251-7. – 2017 Polish translation, introduction and commentary

=== Literature ===
- Hristova, Daniela (2006). "Major Textual Boundary of Linguistic Usage in the Galician-Volhynian Chronicle". Russian History. 33 (2/4): 313–331. doi:10.1163/187633106X00195. JSTOR 24664447.
- Hrushevsky, Mykhailo (1901). Хронологія Подій Галицько-волинського Літопису [Chronology of the Events of the Halych–Volyn Chronicle] (in Ukrainian). Lviv: Records of the Shevchenko Scientific Society.
- Isoaho, Mari (2006). The Image of Aleksandr Nevskiy in Medieval Russia: Warrior and Saint. Leiden: Brill. p. 428. ISBN 9789047409496.
- Jusupović, Adrian (2022). The Chronicle of Halych-Volhynia and Historical Collections in Medieval Rus'. Leiden: Brill. p. 268. ISBN 9789004509306.
- Magocsi, Paul R. (1983). Galicia: A Historical Survey and Bibliographic Guide. University of Toronto Press. p. 53. ISBN 0-8020-2482-3.
- Raffensperger, Christian; Ostrowski, Donald (2023). The Ruling Families of Rus: Clan, Family and Kingdom. London: Reaktion Books. p. 309. ISBN 978-1-78914-745-2. (e-book)
  - "The Galician–Volhynian Chronicle as a Historical Source", pp. 148–150.
- (under Oleksiy Tolochko's editorship; co-authors: V. Aristov, Y. Zatyliuk, K. Kyrychenko, V. Rychka, V. Stavysky, P. Tolochko, T. Vilkul). Halyt︠s︡ʹko-Volynsʹkyĭ litopys: tekstolohii︠a︡ Галицько-волинський літопис: текстологія [The Galician-Volhynian Chronicle: A Text-Critical Inquiry] (in Ukrainian). Kyiv: Akademperiodyka. 2020. p. 929. ISBN 978-966-360-419-0. Textual criticism of the Galician-Volhynian Chronicle.
  - Tolochko, Oleksiy (2025). "Studying the Galician-Volhynian Chronicle. Response to Dariusz Dąbrowski". Kwartalnik Historyczny. 132 (3). Wydawnictwo Naukowe Semper: 553–572.
