= Rota system =

Succession system in Kievan Rus'

The rota (or rotation) system or the lestvitsa system (Russian: лествичное право, лествица, лествичная система) is a historiographical concept introduced by historian Sergei Soloviev in 1860, attempting to describe a system of collateral succession practiced (though imperfectly) in Kievan Rus', later appanages, and early the Principality of Moscow. In this system, the throne passed not linearly from father to son (agnatic primogeniture), but laterally from brother to brother (usually to the fourth brother) and then to the eldest son of the eldest brother who had held the throne.

== Scholarly discussions ==
"Whether there was a system of succession in the early Rus' principalities and, to the extent there was one, its operation as well as how long it lasted, has been in dispute among historians."

— Donald Ostrowski (2012)

Scholars have debated the nature and existence of the rota system, with some claiming that no formal system of succession existed in the Kievan Rus'. No sources from the period describe such a system. Proponents of the rota system usually attribute its introduction or rationalisation to Yaroslav the Wise (died 1054), who assigned each of his sons a principality based on seniority. But the pattern of agnatic succession in Kievan Rus' predates his reign, and was also used among the Norse of Great Britain and Ireland. Critics of the rota concept characterise the succession process as "chaotic", emphasising just how repetitive succession struggles and wars of succession were within Kievan Rus', particularly in the 12th and early 13th centuries; the strongest opponents have therefore concluded that it could not reasonably qualify as a "system". Proponents of the rota system have included Sergei Soloviev, Vasily Klyuchevsky, Mykhailo Hrushevsky, Mikhail Borisovich Sverdlov, and George Vernadsky. Opponents of the rota concept have included Alexander Presnyakov, A. D. Stokes, Simon Franklin and Jonathan Shepard.

Several attempts have been made to reconcile the positions of proponents and outright opponents. Some scholars have argued that a rota system did exist, but failed to function properly, with John Lister Illingworth Fennell theorising that as the princely clan grew larger and larger, an increasing number of junior princes was excluded from the right to succeed, and driven as they were by greed, they were the ones starting all the succession struggles. On the other hand, Nancy Shields Kollmann sought to demonstrate that dynastic growth rarely led to instability, as high rates of mortality and the exclusion of izgoi branches kept the number of eligible princes "manageable"; a hypothesis that Janet L. B. Martin seconded. Oleksiy Tolochko tried to reconcile both perspectives by arguing that the notion of "seniority" evolved over time: in the 11th century, it was determined by birth, but by the mid-12th century, it was determined by having military control over the throne of Kiev. Janet Martin suggested that the fact that some successions went smoothly and uncontested contradicts the argument that there was no system and always a "chaotic" transfer of power; the times where warfare decided succession disputes might thus have been violations of an otherwise well-established order, exceptions to the rules (whatever they were).

== Concept ==
Rota system diagram. Legend: Grey: incumbent; Half-grey: predecessor of incumbent; Square: male; Black: deceased; Diagonal: cannot be displaced; cross: excluded or Izgoi (excluded from succession due to their parent never having held the throne)

According to the rota system concept, when the grand prince died, the next most senior prince moved to Kiev and all others moved to the principality next up the ladder. Only those princes whose fathers had held the throne were eligible for placement in the rota; if a man died before ascending to the throne, his sons were known as izgoi: they and their descendants were ineligible to reign. (Note: 'If an individual's father did not rule, then that individual was izgoi (из = "from" + гоити = "to live") – not eligible to rule. That removed eligibility also extended to all his descendants as well.')

The concept was first noted by Sergei Soloviev, and later summed up by Vasily Kliuchevsky, but in the intervening years, the structured and institutionalized rota system they presented has come under criticism by some, who doubt any such succession system to the Kievan throne existed at all. Indeed, scholars such as Sergeevich and Budovnitz argued that the seemingly endless internecine war among the princes of Kiev indicates a total lack of any established succession system. Others have modified the system but not fully abandoned it, such as A. D. Stokes, who denied that there was ever a geographic hierarchy of principalities, although there was a hierarchy of the princes themselves. Janet L. B. Martin argued that the system, in fact, worked. She argued that the interprincely wars were not a breakdown or absence of a system, but the further refinement of the system as the dynasty grew in size and relations became more complex. Each new outburst of violence addressed a new problem rather than rehashing old disputes.

The rota system was modified by the princely summit conference held at Liubech in the Chernigov in 1097. Certain lands were granted as patrimonial lands, that is inherited lands outside the rota system. These lands were not lost by a prince when the Kievan throne became vacant, and they served as core lands that grew up into semi-independent (if not outright independent) principalities in the later centuries of Kievan Rus, leading some historians to argue that Kievan Rus ceased to be a unified state. After this conference, the rota system continued to work within these patrimonial principalities at least up to the Mongol Invasion. The rota system also continued with regard to the Kievan throne after 1113 up to the Mongol Invasion as well.

The rota system in some aspects survived Kievan Rus' by more than a century. Indeed, the Muscovite War of Succession (1425–1453) between Vasily II and Dmitry Shemyaka was over this very issue. Shemyaka's father, Yury of Zvenigorod, claimed that he was the rightful heir to the throne of the Principality of Vladimir through collateral succession. However, Yury's elder brother, Vasily I had passed the throne on to his son Vasily II. Dmitry and his brothers continued to press their father's and their line's claim to the throne, leading to open war between Vasily II and Shemyaka which led to Vasily's brief ouster and blinding, and Dmitry's assassination by poison in Novgorod the Great in 1453. Even before the civil war though, Vasily I's father, Dmitry Donskoy, had, in fact, passed the throne on to Vasily by a will that called for linear succession rather than collateral succession, but the issue didn't come to a head until Vasily's death because he was the eldest of his generation and was thus the rightful successor by both linear and collateral succession. Thus it was only with Vasily II that the Muscovite princes were finally able to break the long-held tradition of collateral succession and establish a system of linear succession to the Muscovite throne. In doing so, they kept power in Moscow, rather than seeing it pass to other princes in other towns.

== Bibliography ==
- Martin, Janet (1995). Medieval Russia, 980–1584. Cambridge: Cambridge University Press. p. 450. ISBN 9780521368322.
- Martin, Janet (2006). "Calculating Seniority and the Contests for Succession in Kievan Rus'". Russian History. 33 (2/4). Brill: 267–281. ISSN 1876-3316. JSTOR 24664444.
- Ostrowski, Donald (2012). "Systems of Succession in Rus' and Steppe Societies". Ruthenica. XI: 39–43.
- Ostrowski, Donald (2018). "Was There a Riurikid Dynasty in Early Rus'?". Canadian-American Slavic Studies. 52 (1): 30–49. doi:10.1163/22102396-05201009.
