= Lectio difficilior potior =

Principle of textual criticism

Lectio difficilior potior (Latin: "the difficult reading is stronger") is an important, internal criterion in textual criticism. When different manuscripts of a text conflict, this principle requires that the harder, unusual, more obtuse reading is to be preferred. It is based on the assumption that scribes are more likely to replace odd words in difficult places with more familiar vocabulary in more expected positions.

It was one principle among many that became established in early 18th-century textual criticism, being part of an attempt by scholars of the Age of Enlightenment to provide a neutral basis for discovering an urtext that was independent of the weight of traditional authority.

== History ==
Rabbeinu Tam (1100 – 1171) expressed the idea in his responsa The Book of right (Heb. ספר הישר, Sefer haYashar),

it was written by the author of the Talmud, since students who correct the text do not correct it in order to make the text difficult.

Erasmus expressed the idea in his Annotations to the New Testament in the early 1500s,

And whenever the Fathers report that there is a variant reading, that one always appears to me to be more esteemed [by them is the one] which at first glance seems the more absurd—since it is reasonable that a reader who is either not very learned or not very attentive was offended by the specter of absurdity and changed the text.

According to Paolo Trovato, who cites Sebastiano Timpanaro, the principle was first codified by Jean Le Clerc in his Ars critica.

It was also laid down by Johann Albrecht Bengel as "proclivi scriptioni praestat ardua" in his "Prodromus Novi Testamenti Graeci Rectè Cautèque Adornandi" in 1725 and employed in his "Novum Testamentum Graecum" in 1734.

Otherwise, it is often attributed to Johann Jakob Wettstein.

== Scholarly use ==
Many scholars considered the employment of lectio difficilior potior an objective criterion that would even override other evaluative considerations. The poet and scholar A. E. Housman challenged such reactive applications in 1922, in the provocatively titled article "The Application of Thought to Textual Criticism."

On the other hand, taken as an axiom, the principle lectio difficilior produces an eclectic text, rather than one based on a history of manuscript transmission. "Modern eclectic praxis operates on a variant unit basis without any apparent consideration of the consequences", Maurice A. Robinson warned. He suggested that to the principle "should be added a corollary, difficult readings created by individual scribes do not tend to perpetuate in any significant degree within transmissional history."

A noted proponent of the superiority of the Byzantine text-type, the form of the Greek New Testament in the largest number of surviving manuscripts, Robinson would use the corollary to explain differences from the Majority Text as scribal errors that were not perpetuated because they were known to be errant or because they existed only in a small number of manuscripts at the time.

Most textual-critical scholars would explain the corollary by the assumption that scribes tended to "correct" harder readings and so cut off the stream of transmission. Thus, only earlier manuscripts would have the harder readings. Later manuscripts would not see the corollary principle as being a very important one to get closer to the original form of the text.

However, lectio difficilior is not to be taken as an absolute rule either but as a general guideline. "In general, the more difficult reading is to be preferred" is Bruce Metzger's reservation. "There is truth in the maxim: lectio difficilior lectio potior ('the more difficult reading is the more probable reading')," write Kurt and Barbara Aland.

However, for scholars like Kurt Aland, who follow a path of reasoned eclecticism based on evidence both internal and external to the manuscripts, "this principle must not be taken too mechanically, with the most difficult reading (lectio difficillima) adopted as original simply because of its degree of difficulty." Also, Martin Litchfield West cautions: "When we choose the 'more difficult reading' ... we must be sure that it is in itself a plausible reading. The principle should not be used in support of dubious syntax, or phrasing that it would not have been natural for the author to use. There is an important difference between a more difficult reading and a more unlikely reading."

Responding to Tetyana Vilkul's review of his 2003 critical edition of the Primary Chronicle (PVL), Donald Ostrowski (2005) phrased the principle as follows: "The more difficult reading is preferred to a smoother reading, except, again, where a mechanical copying error would explain the roughness. The rationale is that a copyist is more likely to have tried to make a rough reading smoother than to have made a smooth reading more difficult to understand."

== See also ==
- Bayes' theorem
- Lectio brevior
- Criterion of embarrassment
