= Gostomysl =

Folk posadnik of Novgorod

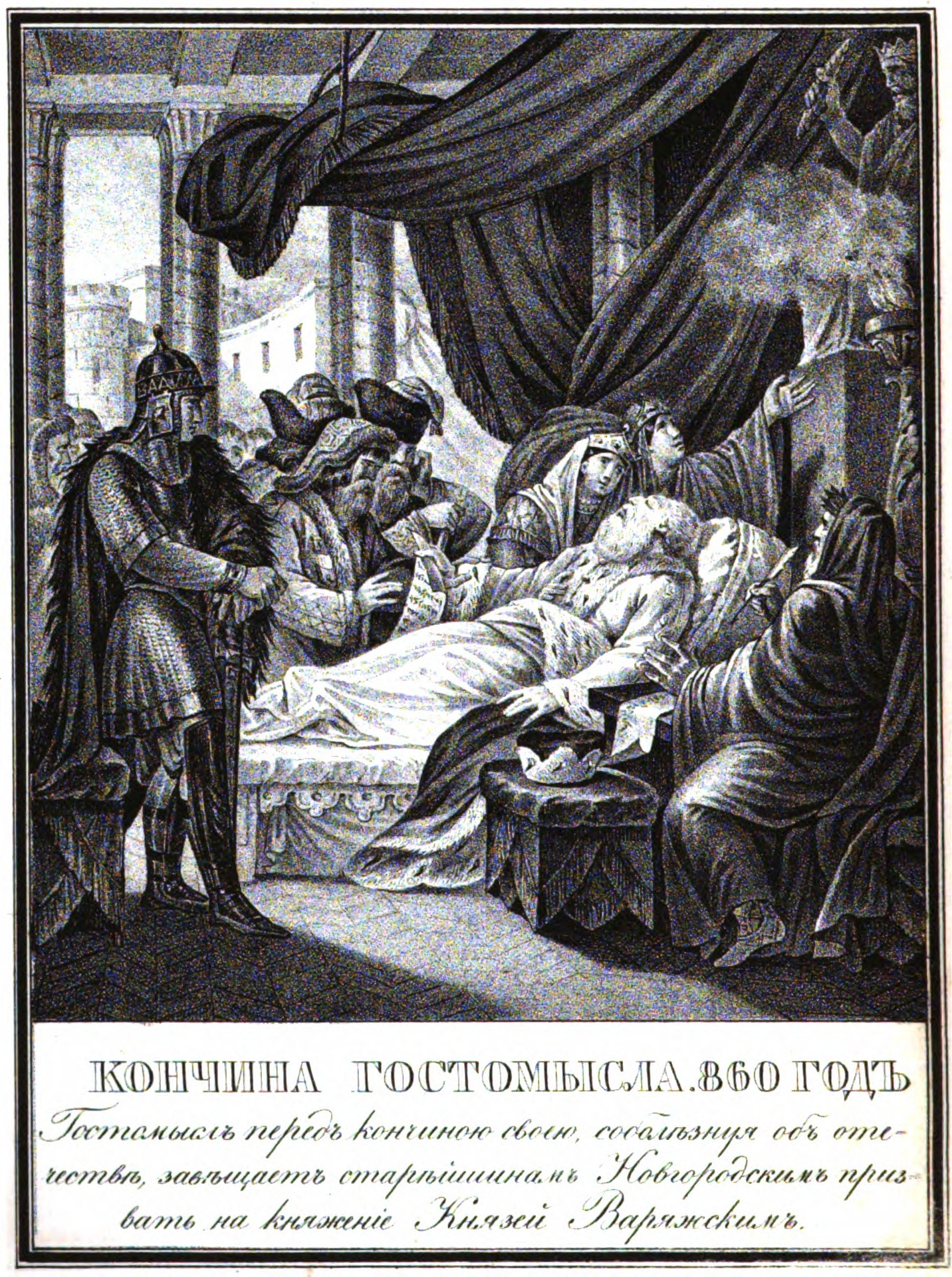
Gostomysl depicted on the first plate of the book Illustrated Karamzin (1836), depicting the history of Russia.

Gostomysl (Russian: Гостомысл, Russian pronunciation: [ɡəstɐˈmɨsl]) was a legendary 9th-century prince or posadnik of Novgorod, who was introduced in chronicles of the XV century and developed in the Russian historiography by Vasily Tatishchev (1686–1750).

== Legendary account ==
Gostomysl was a figure appearing in later works of Russia history. He was named as the first elder of Novgorod according to a list of posadniks in the Novgorod First Chronicle. In the genealogies of XVI's work, The Tale of the Princes of Vladimir, Gostomysl appears as the ruler of Novgorod after a period of desolation, who advised the calling of someone of "Augustan lineage" (Rurik) from "prussian lands" to the Rus.

According to Tatishchev, who claimed to have derived his information from the now-lost Ioachim Chronicle, Gostomysl was elected by the Ilmen Slavs as their supreme ruler and expelled the Varangians from what is now northwestern Russia.

But the alleged Ioachim Chronicle is considered by researchers to be the most dubious part of the so-called "Tatishchev information", and widely believed to be a later fabrication, perhaps by Tatishchev himself.

== Use in nationalist narratives and rejection of his historicity ==
The legend of Gostomysl was much aired by the writers and composers working in the nationalist milieu of Catherine II's reign. However, the historians Gerhardt Friedrich Müller and Nikolay Karamzin gave no credit to Tatischev's story, believing that the very name of Gostomysl resulted from a misinterpretation of two Slavic words - gost' ("guest") and mysl' ("thought"). Gostomysl's existence is doubted by virtually every modern historian.

== Bibliography ==
- Tolochko, Oleksiy Petrovych (2005). "Istoriia Rossiiskaia" Vasiliia Tatishcheva: istochniki i izvestiia "История Российская" Василия Татищева: источники и известия [Vasily Tatishchev's "History of Russia": Sources and Information]. Moscow: Новое литературное обозрение Novoe literaturnoe obozrenie. p. 543. ISBN 9789667679620.
- Petrukhin, Vladimir (2014). "Rus v IX-X vekakh: Ot prizvaniia variagov do vybora very "усь в IX-X веках. От призвания варягов до выбора веры [Rus in the 9th–10th Centuries. From Varangians Invitation to the Сhoice of Faith] (PDF). Moscow. p. 465. ISBN 5041561702.
