= Serhii Buhoslavskyi =

Soviet literary historian, composer and musicologist from Ukraine (1888–1945)

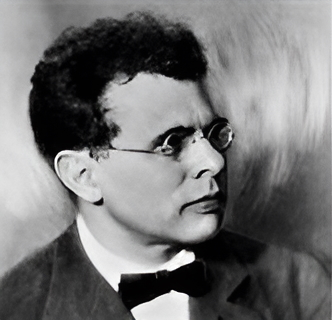
Bohuslavskiy pictured some time before 1945

Serhii Oleksiyovych Buhoslavskyi (Ukrainian: Сергій Олексійович Бугославський; Russian: Сергей Алексеевич Бугославский, romanized: Sergei Alekseevich Bugoslavskii or Bugoslavskij; Chernihiv, 2 July [O.S. 20 June] 1888 – Moscow, 14 January 1946) was a Russian Imperial and Soviet literary historian, musicologist and composer from present-day Ukraine. Buhoslavskyi is known for his work on textual criticism of the Primary Chronicle.

== Biography ==
He graduated om 1907 from the RMT Music School and in 1912 from Saint Vladimir University (renamed Taras Shevchenko National University of Kyiv in 1939).

He received his academic training at the seminar of East Slavic philology of Volodymyr Peretz. He studied music composition with Reinhold Glière, Oleksandr Oleksandrovych Illinsky, and Sergei Vasilenko.

From 1916 he was a master, associate professor, professor at the Tavrida National V.I. Vernadsky University in Simferopol in Crimea. From 1922 he taught in Moscow at the Communist University of the Toilers of the East, the Higher Institute of Literature and Art, and Moscow State University.

From 1926 to 1930, Buhoslavskyi served as the artistic director of the All Union First Programme of the Moscow-based All-Union Radio.

From 1938 to 1945, he worked at the Gorky Institute of World Literature in Moscow. In 1941, Buhoslavskyi advanced a more systematic approach to textual criticism of the Primary Chronicle than Aleksey Shakhmatov, but his work was lost during World War II and only rediscovered decades later. He died in Moscow on 14 January 1946.

== Selected works ==
- Україно-руські пам'ятки XI-XVIII вв. про князів Бориса та Гліба (Київ, 1928)
- Ирма Яунзем, исполнительница песен народностей, М. — Л., 1927, М., 1929
- Два этюда о Бетховене, М. — Л., 1927
- Музыка и кино. Принципы и методы киномузыки…, М., 1926 (совм. с В. Л. Мессманом)
- Рейнгольд Морицевич Глиэр, М., 1927, доп., М., 1930
- Музыка в кино, М., 1928
- Музыкальное сопровождение в кино, М. — Л., 1929 (совм. с Д. С. Блоком)
- Музыка в современном быту народов СССР, в сб.: Искусство народов СССР, М., 1930
- Звуковые элементы в творчестве Максима Горького, в сб.: Музыкальный альманах, М., 1932, с. 65-69
- М. М. Ипполитов-Иванов. Жизнь и творчество, М., 1936
- Русские народные песни в записи Пушкина (с публикацией нотных записей Б. в пушкинских местах), в сб.: Пушкин. Временник Пушкинской комиссии, т. VI, М. — Л., 1941, и др.
- Buhoslavskyi, Serhii (1941). "Povest' vremennykh let' (Spiski, redaktsii, pervonacharnyi tekst)". In Gudzii, N. K. (ed.). Starinnaia russkaia povest': Stat'i i issledovaniia (in Russian). Moscow and Leningrad. pp. 7–37.

== Sources ==
- Gippius, Alexey A. (2014). "Reconstructing the original of the Povesť vremennyx let: a contribution to the debate". Russian Linguistics. 38 (3). Springer: 341–366. doi:10.1007/s11185-014-9137-y. JSTOR 43945126. S2CID 255017212.
- Isoaho, Mari (2018). "Shakhmatov's Legacy and the Chronicles of Kievan Rus'". Kritika: Explorations in Russian and Eurasian History. 19 (3). Slavica Publishers: 637–648. doi:10.1353/kri.2018.0033. S2CID 159688925.
- Ostrowski, Donald (March 1981). "Textual Criticism and the Povest' vremennykh let: Some Theoretical Considerations". Harvard Ukrainian Studies. 5 (1). Harvard Ukrainian Research Institute: 11–31. JSTOR 41035890.
- Бугославський Сергій Олексійович
- Бугославський Сергей Алексеевич
- Бугославский Сергей Алексеевич
- Прес-центр
