= Tatishchev information =

Historiographical texts by Vasily Tatishchev

Tatishchev information (Russian: Татищевские известия, romanized: Tatishchevskie izvestiya; Ukrainian: Татищевські звістки (Note: 'Попри дискусійність окремих висновків Олексія Толочка, він усе ж має рацію, що ці татищевські “звістки” та “давні літописи” (насамперед Йоахимівський) є, радше, містифікацією видатного російського історика.' ("Despite the debatability of some of Oleksiy Tolochko's conclusions, he is nevertheless right that these Tatyshchev 'tidings' and 'ancient chronicles' (primarily Ioachim's) are rather a hoax by the prominent Russian historian.")), romanized: Tatyshchevs'ki zvistky) is a group of historiographical texts written by Imperial Russian historian Vasily Tatishchev (1686–1750) and posthumously published in his book Istoriya Rossiyskaya (История Российская, "History of Russia", 1768 onwards), containing information that has no analogues in currently known historical sources. Soviet historian Iakov Lur'e (1968) defined it as 'data found only in that historian', that is, in Tatishchev's writings. American historian Edward C. Thaden (1986) described "Tatishchev's information" as 'information to be found in no known Russian chronicle but only in Tatishchev'. The origin and authenticity of the information is debatable; they can be considered as fabrications of history created by Tatishchev himself. The alleged Ioachim Chronicle is considered by researchers to be the most dubious part of the Tatishchev information.

'It is in connection with [the need for a critical approach to sources] that we find the extremely skeptical attitude of the historiographer [Nikolay Karamzin] toward the information in the chronicle of the "pseudo Ioakim" incorporated in the Istoriia Rossiiskaia of Tatishchev and toward other "Tatishchev information" (data found only in that historian) which Karamzin considered "inventions" and "fantasies".'

— Iakov Lur'e (1968)

Tatishchev often did not cite his sources, which required later critical historians to find out where he got his information from. After several sources were discovered, the texts of Tatishchev which remained unaccounted for (such as the alleged Ioachim Chronicle, which has never been found) became known as "Tatishchev information", which is not to be trusted until it is supported by another extant source. They are texts of varying length, from one or two added words to large whole stories, including lengthy speeches of princes and boyars. Sometimes Tatishchev comments on these stories in notes, referring to chronicles unknown to modern science, or not reliably identified ("Rostov", "Golitsynskaya", "Raskolnichya", "Chronicle of Simon the Bishop"). However, in most cases the source of the original information is not indicated by Tatishchev.

Historian Nikolay Karamzin of the 19th century was one of the earliest critics of Tatishchev's dubious claims around the Ioakim Chronicle and his various other doubtful texts, calling them "inventions" and "fantasies". On the other hand, Sergey Solovyov (1820–1879) had no problem making extensive use of Tatishchev's writings and late chronicles (such as the highly interpolated Nikon Chronicle), which brought him into conflict with the more cautious Russo-Ukrainian historian Mykola Kostomarov (1817–1885), whom Solovyov accused of "petty historical criticism".

In 1920, philologist Aleksey Shakhmatov observed many discrepancies between the printed (second) redaction of the Istoriya Rossiyskaya and the handwritten (first) redaction, concluding that Tatishchev had made numerous additions of his own invention while working on the text; by and large, these were interpolations not found in any source documents. Between 1962 and 1968, the Academy of Sciences of the Soviet Union published a critical edition of the Istoriya Rossiyskaya and other works of Tatishchev (some of them yet unpublished) for scholarly examination of the reliability of all his assertions. S.L. Peshtich (1965) demonstrated that even in his first redaction, but especially his second redaction, Tatishchev invented "facts" that suited his own beliefs, such as that monarchs should have high moral principles, trade should receive state patronage, there should be religious tolerance, and so on.

'It is now quite clear that the so-called “Tatishchev accounts” (otherwise unattested “chronicle” information in his work) are all fabrications, deliberately introduced by the author himself. Forgeries played a critical role in the Istoriia rossiiskaia project.'

— Oleksiy Tolochko (2004)

In 1968, Soviet historian Iakov Lur'e popularised the term "Tatishchev information" for all unsourced or poorly sourced dubious claims that Tatishchev ever made in his writings that could not be verified in other extant sources. He added that the interpolations of Tatishchev were 'idiosyncratic fables' that were not necessarily 'dishonest' insertions, but that 'the scholars who are trying to use his history as a source[,] they are really dangerous.' Lur'e accused George Vernadsky's Kievan Russia (1948) of uncritically recycling Tatishchev information about an alleged commercial treaty that Vladimir the Great supposedly concluded with the Volga Bulgars in 1006, which is only found in Tatishchev's second (printed) redaction of the Istoriya Rossiyskaya, not in his first redaction, and is not known from any other source, but fits neatly with Tatishchev's own mercantilist theories. Vernadsky knew that S. L. Peshtich had written an article in 1946 arguing that there is no evidence of such a treaty, 'but [Vernadsky] neither accepted its conclusions nor refuted them in any way.' Similarly, Vernadsky wrote that 'Tatishchev's data fit well into the general historical picture' about Roman of Smolensk and Konstantin of Suzdal founding schools in the 12th and 13th centuries, even though this is only recorded in Tatishchev's second redaction, nowhere else, and seems to conveniently echo Tatishchev's Enlightenment ideas about the importance of education, rather than reflecting historical sources.

In 1986, Giovanna Brogi Bercoff studied Tatishchev's ideology, finding that the ideas espoused in the Tatishchev information are quite often borrowed from the works of Justus Lipsius and Christian Wolff, of whom Tatishchev was an avid reader. From Wolff, he borrowed "ideas of natural law, social contract between the ruler and people, and the moral and ethical component in political life, “good advisers” as an indispensable element of virtuous rule, the corruptive effect [of] the monarch’s false promises, the desirability of direct inheritance." From Lipsius, Tatishchev borrowed the "approach to the past as a set of moral exempla. According to Lipsius, only the moral benefits of the didactic reading of the past justify the effort expended on studying history." Brogi Bercoff observed that the most striking parts of the Istoriia rossiiskaia are numerous speeches, which were absent in the medieval Rus' chronicles. Moreover, these speeches are full of rhetorical devices that were commonly used during the Southern and Western European Renaissance, but that were unknown in Old East Slavic literature.

Ukrainian historian Oleksiy Tolochko published a detailed examination of the Istoriya Rossiyskaya in 2005, summarising the issue as when there is anything Tatishchev wrote that is 'completely unknown in other sources', it 'must be considered "Tatishchev information" and thus suspect' (in the words of Donald Ostrowski).

== Bibliography ==
- Luria, J. (1968). "Problems of Source Criticism (with Reference to Medieval Russian Documents)". Slavic Review. 27 (1). Cambridge University Press: 1–22. doi:10.2307/2493909. ISSN 0037-6779. JSTOR 2493909. (Written by Iakov Solomonovich Lur'e, Яков Соломонович Лурье. Translated from Russian to English by Michael Cherniavsky).
- Ostrowski, Donald (2018). "Was There a Riurikid Dynasty in Early Rus'?". Canadian-American Slavic Studies. 52 (1): 30–49. doi:10.1163/22102396-05201009.
- Skochylyas, Ihor Yaroslavovych (2010). "Початки християнства у прикарпатському реґіоні та заснування Галицької єпархії в середині ХІІ століття" [The beginnings of Christianity in Sub-Carpathia and establishment of the eparchy of Halych in the mid-twelfth century] (PDF). Княжа доба: історія і культура (in Ukrainian) (3). Institute of Ukrainian Studies (Lviv): 9–59.
- Thaden, Edward C. (1986). "V. N. Tatishchev, German historians, and the St. Petersburg Academy of Sciences". Russian History. 13 (4). Brill: 367–398. doi:10.1163/187633186X00160. ISSN 0094-288X. JSTOR 24655857.
- Tolochko, Oleksiy Petrovych (2004). "Truth from Forgery: Vasilii Tatishchev and the Origin of the Master Narrative of Russian History". Journal of Ukrainian Studies. 29 (1/2). CIUS: 457–469. Archived (PDF) from the original on 26 May 2026.
- Tolochko, Oleksiy Petrovych (2005). "История Российская" Василия Татищева: источники и известия "Istoriia Rossiiskaia" Vasiliia Tatishcheva: istochniki i izvestiia [Vasily Tatishchev's "History of Russia": Sources and Information] (in Russian). Moscow: Новое литературное обозрение Novoe literaturnoe obozrenie. p. 543. ISBN 9795867933462 (also published at Krytyka, Kyiv, 2005)
- "Татищев Василий Никитич". Great Russian Encyclopedia. Volume 31 (in Russian). Russian Academy of Sciences. 2016.
