= Daniel Waugh =

Daniel Waugh is the name of:

- Daniel C. Waugh, American historian
- Daniel W. Waugh (1842-1921), U.S. Representative from Indiana
