= Textual criticism of the Primary Chronicle =

Analysis of Primary Chronicle textual witnesses

Textual criticism or textology of the Primary Chronicle or Tale of Bygone Years (Old East Slavic: Повѣсть времѧньныхъ лѣтъ, romanized: Pověstĭ vremęnĭnyxŭ lětŭ, (Note: Belarusian: Аповесць мінулых часоў, romanized: Apoviesć minulych časoŭ; Russian: Повесть временных лет, romanized: Povest' vremennykh let; Ukrainian: Повість минулих літ, romanized: Povist' mynulykh lit) commonly transcribed Povest' vremennykh let and abbreviated PVL) aims to reconstruct the original text by comparing extant witnesses. This has included the search for reliable textual witnesses (such as extant manuscripts and quotations of lost manuscripts); the collation and publication of such witnesses; the study of identified textual variants (including developing a critical apparatus); discussion, development and application of methods according to which the most reliable readings are identified and favoured of others; and the ongoing publication of critical editions in pursuit of a paradosis ("a proposed best reading").

== Overview ==
'The history of writing of the chronicles is a problem for students of Old Russian literature because the extant manuscripts, which are from the fifteenth or sixteenth centuries or later, are copies of the earlier ones. It is often extremely difficult to discover what parts of a chronicle were written at what time, that is, whether a given section (or even phrase or word) is from an early manuscript or from a later insertion or "correction".'

— Lisa Lynn Heinrich (1977)

In 1981, Donald Ostrowski identified 5 'most serious problems' in the publication of the Povest' vremennykh let that were unresolved at the time:

1. 'which manuscript copies to use as witnesses to the PVL;
2. whether to publish the PVL as a separate text or as part of another chronicle;
3. which principles of textual criticism to employ in editing the text;
4. which variants from other copies to put in the critical apparatus; and
5. whether to be content with a modified extant copy or to strive for a dynamic critical text.'

== History of scholarship ==
The first time the PVL was published was in 1767, as part of a faulty Radziwiłł Chronicle edition. Attempts to publish the PVL as part of another chronicle in 1804 and 1812 were abandoned. Ya.I. Berednikov prepared the publication of the Laurentian Codex for the first edition of the PSRL of 1846, whereby he divided the Codex text into "Nestor Chronicle" (up to the year 1110) and "Continuation of the Laurentian Chronicle" (after 1100). Berednikov freely altered readings of the Laurentian text as he saw fit, as well as from his Radziwiłł, Academic, Hypatian, and Khlebnikov control texts, without providing a rationale, resulting in an arbitrary mixture containing many errors. Similarly, Palauzov (1871) prepared an edition of the Hypatian text with Khlebnikov and Pogodin as control texts, while Bychkov prepared an edition of the Laurentian text with Radziwiłł and Academic as control texts. Neither of them described which principles they applied for altering readings, neither was reliable in reporting textual variants, and neither divided their text between PVL and non-PVL parts.

1871 and 1872 also saw the emergence of a new approach in textology, namely, publishing the PVL as a separate text rather than as part of another chronicle. Those years, lithographic versions of the Hypatian and Laurentian texts of the PVL were published, although both titles claimed to represent "the" Povest' vremennykh let. Lev Isaevich Leibovich (1876) and Aleksey Shakhmatov (1916) would further develop the PVL-only approach, attempting to reconstruct a composite version of the PVL based on the earliest extant textual witnesses. However, because they presented confusing or contradictory information about the interrelationships between the early copies and the autograph, neither attempt was successful.

Russian scholar Aleksey Shakhmatov (1864–1920) was a pioneer in textual criticism of the PVL, doing much ground-breaking work, (Note: Halperin (1994) described Shakhmatov as "the founder of the comparative-textological metholodogy and of critical studies of East Slavic chronicle-writing".) although his reconstruction has been repeatedly criticised for its subjectivity. He contributed to the idea that Hypatian was necessarily inferior to Laurentian, which gave the latter an often-undeserved privileged status for reliability that would hamper further research. Ukrainian scholar Serhii Buhoslavskyi (1941) advanced a more systematic approach, but his work was lost during World War II and only rediscovered decades later.

Dmitry Likhachev (1950) rejected both the goal of establishing "a 'composite text' 'according to all copies'" and of "a hypothetical reconstruction of the original text"; he would only print "a text that really has reached us in the Laurentian Chronicle." Ostrowski (1981) accused Likhachev, Bychkov and Karski of submitting to what leading textual critic W. W. Greg called "the tyranny of the copy-text": they assumed the Laurentian text to be superior, and repeatedly persisted in maintaining an inferior reading not found in any other of the main witnesses (a lectio singularis), 'apparently for the sole reason that [the Laurentian text] has it.' Furthermore, Ostrowski demonstrated Likhachev also favoured readings of Radziwiłł and Academic over (generally more reliable) readings from Hypatian, apparently just because the former two were more closely related to Laurentian than Hypatian was. He criticised Likhachev as failing to provide justification for prioritising the Laurentian in virtually all cases, and undermining his own claim of printing "a text that really has reached us" due to numerous alterations Likhachev made to his copy of the Laurentian text based on superior readings from his control texts.

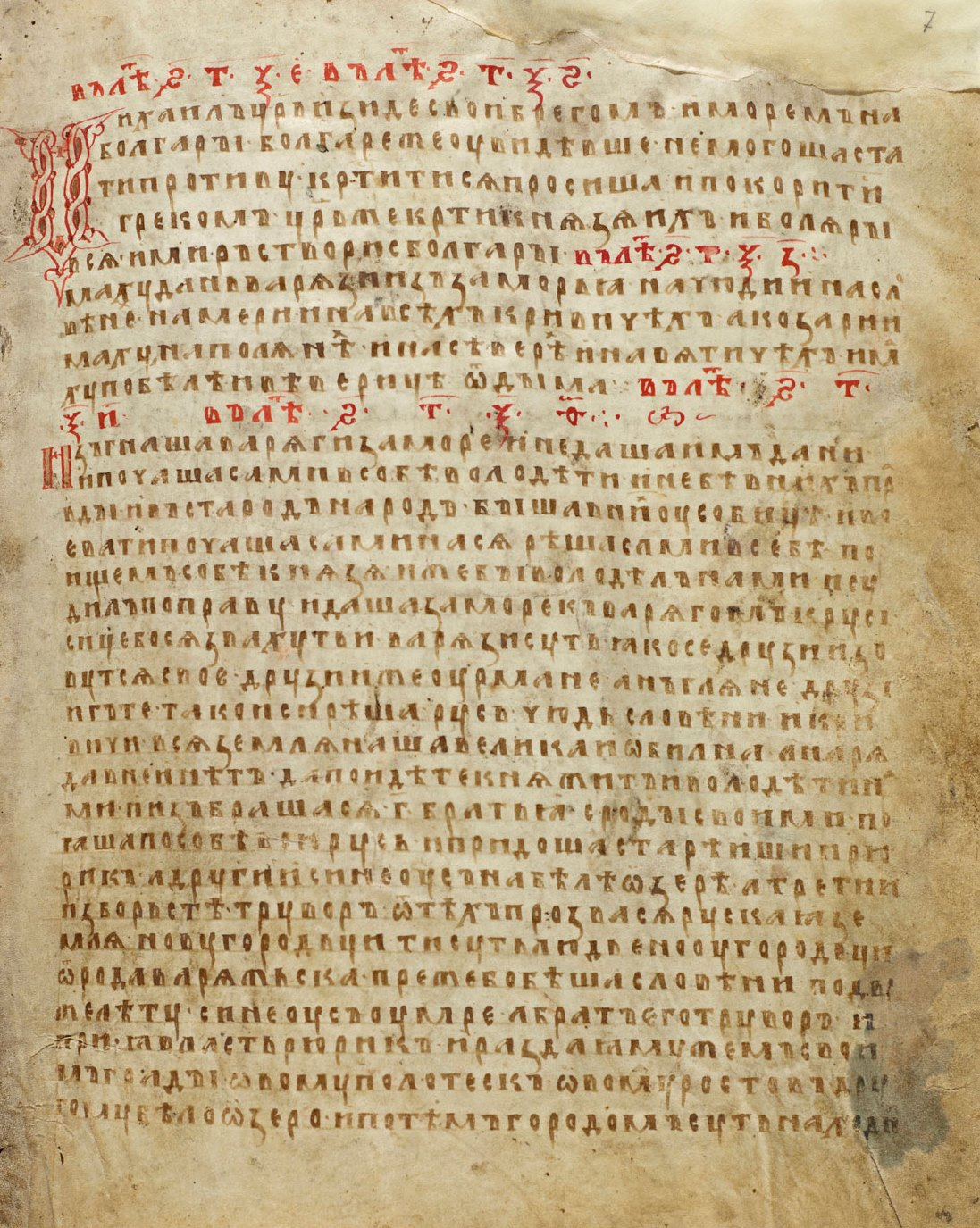
Copy of the calling of the Varangians text as preserved in the Laurentian Codex

Interest in textual criticism declined in the second half of the 20th century, but was given a new impulse at the beginning of the 21st century by the publication of a new modern German translation by Ludolf Müller in 2001, an interlinear collation of the six main copies and a paradosis by Ostrowski et al. in 2003, and various early 2000s publications by Oleksiy Tolochko and Tetyana Vilkul from the Centre of Kievan Rus' Studies (Ukrainian: Сектор досліджень історії Київської Русі) in Kyiv. These early-21st-century publications were the first to challenge the core parts of Shakhmatov's views, which had until then been widely accepted. Isoaho (2018) summarised Tolochko's critique as follows:

Tolochko sharply disagrees with Shakhmatov's thesis of earlier layers underlying the PVL on the grounds that this theory opened a kind of Pandora's box, revealing old chronicle layers wherever one looked. In this way, Tolochko claims, Russian and Soviet scholars have created a national myth about medieval sources that never existed but are treated as if they did. Identifying these layers make it possible to accept the PVL as an authentic witness to each historical incident that it describes [as if] the PVL offers a real eyewitness report.

Vilkul (2015) demonstrated that the Novgorod First Chronicle in the Younger Redaction (Younger NPL) has been contaminated by the PVL, so that the PVL text must necessarily be older, and the Younger NPL text reflected the 14th- or 15th-century chronographs and could not be an archetype for the PVL text.

== Textual witnesses ==
=== Main textual witnesses ===
Because the original of the Primary Chronicle as well as the earliest known copies are lost, it is difficult to establish the original content of the chronicle. Although the Laurentian Codex (Lav.) has often been tacitly assumed to be the Primary Chronicle in much of scholarly literature, modern scholars seeking to understand the history of the Primary Chronicle use a range of sources. (Note: 'In view of the ubiquitous differences, what are we to consider the text? Much of scholarly literature, even some very specialized studies, operates with the tacit assumption that [the Laurentian Codex] is the PVL, other evidence being of subordinate value. In fact, [the Laurentian Codex] is often obviously faulty and editors and interpreters rely on the other witnesses, preferably [the Hypatian Codex].') The six main manuscripts preserving the Primary Chronicle which scholars study for the purpose of textual criticism are: (Note: According to Gippius (2014), the six main manuscripts can be divided in three groups of two: Laurentian/Trinity (LT), Radziwiłł/Academic (RA), and Hypatian/Khlebnikov (HX). Gippius considered the last group the "southern, Kievan branch" and the other four the "Vladimir-Suzdal branch".)

- Laurentian Codex (1377)
- Hypatian Codex (c. 1425)
- Radziwiłł Chronicle (c. 1490 or 1500)
- Academic Chronicle (c. 1500)
- Khlebnikov Codex (c. 1560 or 1575)
- Trinity Chronicle (c. 1450; excluded by some scholars who count only "five main witnesses")
Laurentian Codex
(click for full PDF)

Hypatian Codex
(click for full PDF)

Radziwiłł Chronicle
(click for full PDF)

Academic Chronicle
(click for full PDF)

Khlebnikov Codex
(click for full PDF)
- Primary Chronicle (PVL)
- Southern Rus' sources / Kievan Chronicle
- Suzdalian Chronicle
- Laurentian continuation of the Suzdalian Chronicle
- Radziwiłł Chronicle continuation of the Suzdalian Chronicle
- Galician–Volhynian Chronicle
- Sofia First Chronicle
- Tver Codex of 1305
- lost leaves of surviving manuscripts

=== Value of the Trinity Chronicle ===
"[T]extual comparisons of reconstructed non-texts [the Trinity Chronicle] with hypothetical non-texts [the Compilation of 1448] in order to determine textual primacy cannot be definitive. (...) Inventing new hypothetical compilations or redating old hypothetical compilations is fun, but not terribly productive."

— Charles J. Halperin (2001)

The reconstructed text of the Trinity Chronicle is considered by some scholars to be one of the six main copies that are of greatest importance for textual criticism of the Primary Chronicle (PVL), 'which aims to reconstruct the original [text] by comparing extant witnesses.' Because the original is lost and its text can only be indirectly reconstructed, as Priselkov attempted in 1950, it is considered the least reliable of the six main witnesses, and is sometimes excluded (reducing the total number of "main witnesses" to five). Dmitry Likhachev (1957) criticised 'inattentive scholars' who carelessly utilised Priselkov's 'reconstruction', treating all parts of it as equally reliable and running with it. Similarly, Iakov Lur'e (1976) rebuked uncritical readers for not understanding the differences in probability as expressed by Priselkov in the two font sizes, and treating it as if it were a 'text'.

Charles J. Halperin (2001) accused Lur'e of doing precisely what he told others not to do, namely, using Priselkov's tentative reconstruction of the Trinity Chronicle as a source. He also argued that, although her chronology was widely accepted by Soviet and Western scholars alike, Marina A. Salmina's 1960s–1970s textual analysis of the Trinity Chronicle should equally be considered invalidated by the fact that Priselkov's reconstruction was far from the reliability required to make such bold claims. He concluded that the reconstructed Trinity Chronicle was useless for dating purposes. Margaret Cecelia Ziolkowski (1978) had voiced similar arguments against Salmina's poor use of sources. Noting that in earlier publications of 1976 and 1981, Halperin himself had also tried to draw untenable historical conclusions from Priselkov's reconstruction before shifting his position by 2001 and criticising others for doing so, (Note: 'There is nevertheless a serious problem with the Trinity Chronicle – it no longer exists, for the original manuscript perished in the fire of Moscow in 1812, when Napoleon paid an unsolicited visit to the former Russian capital. No copy of the famous chronicle was made, although extensive quotations from it appeared in the History of the Russian State, published after the Napoleonic Wars by the official historian of Russia, Nikolai Karamzin. On the basis of these citations, M. D. Priselkov reconstructed the text of the lost chronicle, filling in the text between quotations with borrowings from other, obviously later, chronicles that in his highly informed opinion were closest to the lost text of the Trinity Chronicle. It was on this reconstructed text of the chronicle that Halperin based his conclusions. Although Priselkov's authority remains unchallenged, it is clear that observations made on the basis of his reconstruction rather than on the actual text of the chronicle are hypothetical. In his later studies, Halperin declined to treat Priselkov's reconstruction of the Trinity Chronicle as an authentic and reliable source and even criticized other scholars for doing so.') Serhii Plokhy (2006) argued that these earlier works 'are clearly in need of reexamination, given the hypothetical nature of Priselkov's reconstruction of the Trinity Chronicle'. In a 2010 review of Plokhy's book, which he generally praised, Halperin acknowledged using the reconstruction 'without much precision' for dating the translatio of the "Rus' land" concept, which he hadn't yet 'revised following the reclassification of the Trinity Chronicle as an invalid source because it is a reconstruction, not a "text."' Plokhy and Halperin agreed that of the three passages mentioning the "Rus' land" in the reconstruction, those under the years 1308 and 1328 were Priselkov's interpolations, while the sub anno 1332 passage – known from Karamzin's notes – appeared authentic, but too weak by itself to count as conclusive evidence of the translatio. In 2022, Halperin 'replaced citations to the Trinity Chronicle with references to the Simeonov Chronicle.' (Note: 'I had previously relied upon the Trinity Chronicle (Troitskaia letopis'), which purportedly dates to 1408 (...). However, I later concluded that a reconstruction could not be treated as a text (see Charles J. Halperin [2001]). I have now replaced citations to the Trinity Chronicle with references to the Simeonov Chronicle.')

Ostrowski (1981) remarked: 'Priselkov's reconstruction must be used cautiously because we do not know whether he always checked his readings against the manuscripts.' In their 2003 interlinear collation of the entire PVL, Ostrowski et al. 'included readings from Priselkov's reconstruction only up to the entry for 906. These readings are based on the plates of the early nineteenth-century attempt by Chebotarev and Cherepanov to publish the chronicle while the manuscript was still extant. [Since they] worked directly from the manuscript, the readings they present have a high probability of actually having been in the Trinity Chronicle, in contrast to the readings Priselkov has after 906, which, because they are conjectural, have a lower probability.' Halperin 2022 invoked Priselkov's reconstruction only one more time for an entry sub anno 955, commenting that 'This passage appears in large type, meaning it was quoted verbatim by Karamzin.'

== Stemmatics ==
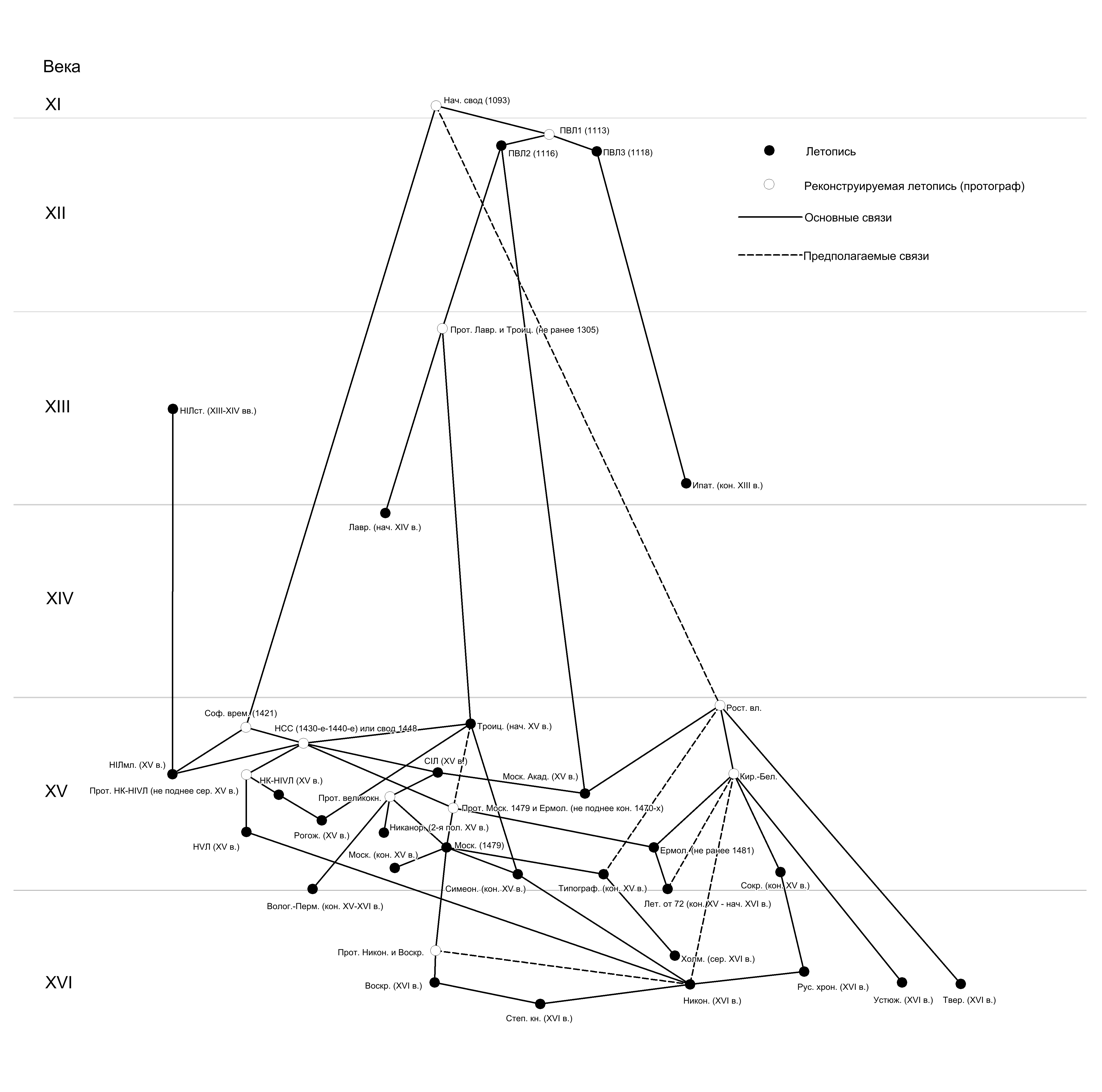
Stemma codicum of the PVL according to the Shakhmatov school

The Primary Chronicle of the beginning of the 12th century is the oldest surviving Rus' chronicle, narrating the earliest history of Kievan Rus'. However Aleksey Shakhmatov paid attention to the abundance of entries about the 11th century Novgorod, which are also present in the Novgorod First Chronicle (of the 15th century), but absent in the Primary Chronicle. This and some others textual facts were a base for Shakhmatov's theory that the beginning of Novgorod First Chronicle includes text that is older than that in the Primary Chronicle. The scholar named it the Nachalnyi svod ("original collection") and dated it to the end of the 11th century. This svod was also a basis for the Primary Chronicle. If two or more chronicles coincide with each other up to a certain year, then either one chronicle is copied from another (more rarely) or these chronicles had a common source, an older svod. Shakhmatov discovered and developed a method of study on the chronicle (svod) genealogy. Based on textual analysis, Shakhmatov built extensive genealogy of the old Rus' chronicles. He connected most of these chronicles and created a genealogy table, in which the extant chronicles of the 14–17th centuries went back not only to the Nachalnyi svod, but also to earlier hypothetical svods of the 11th century and even to historical records of the end of the 10th century. Shakhmatov's method and theories became a mainstay in Rus' chronicle studies.

By the 2010s, the scholarly consensus which largely had agreed with Shakhmatov's stemma codicum had been all but overturned. In its place, several new stemmata had been developed and discussed by Müller, Ostrowski, Vilkul, and others. The mid-2000s polemic between Ostrowski and Vilkul revolved around assessing the most likely genetic relationships and contaminations between the various textual witnesses; according to Gippius (2014), 'Vilkul's approach seems the most promising at present.'

== Bibliography ==
=== Primary sources ===
- Complete Collection of Russian Chronicles (PSRL). Saint Petersburg: Typography of Edward Prats.
  - Izbornyk (1908). Лѣтопись По Ипатьевскому Списку [The Chronicle according to the Hypatian Codex]. Complete Collection of Russian Chronicles (PSRL). Volume 2. 3rd Edition. Col. 15. Saint Petersburg: Typography of Edward Prats.
- Cross, Samuel Hazzard; Sherbowitz-Wetzor, Olgerd P. (1930). The Russian Primary Chronicle, Laurentian Text. Translated and edited by Samuel Hazzard Cross and Olgerd P. Sherbowitz-Wetzor (1930) (PDF). Cambridge, Massachusetts: The Mediaeval Academy of America. p. 325.
  - Cross, Samuel Hazzard; Sherbowitz-Wetzor, Olgerd P. (2013) [1953]. SLA 218. Ukrainian Literature and Culture. Excerpts from The Rus' Primary Chronicle (Povest vremennykh let, PVL) (PDF). Toronto: Electronic Library of Ukrainian Literature, University of Toronto. p. 16. Archived from the original (PDF) on 30 May 2014.
- Ostrowski, Donald, ed. (2003). The Povest' vremennykh let: An Interlinear Collation and Paradosis. 3 volumes (in Russian and English). Cambridge, MA: Harvard University Press. Archived from the original on 9 March 2005. (assoc. ed. David J. Birnbaum (Harvard Library of Early Ukrainian Literature, vol. 10, parts 1–3) – This 2003 Ostrowski et al. edition includes an interlinear collation including the five main manuscript witnesses, as well as a new paradosis ("a proposed best reading").
- Ostrowski, Donald; Birnbaum, David J. (7 December 2014). "Rus' primary chronicle critical edition – Interlinear line-level collation". pvl.obdurodon.org (in Church Slavic). Archived from the original on 28 April 2025.
- Izbornyk (2001). "Новгородская Первая Летопись Младшего Извода" [Novgorod First Chronicle of the Younger Edition]. Izbornyk (in Church Slavic). – digitised version of the mid-15th-century Archaeographic Commission's edition (or "Younger Edition") of the Novgorod First Chronicle (Komissionnyy NPL)

=== Literature ===
- Buhoslavskyi, Serhii (1941). "Povest' vremennykh let' (Spiski, redaktsii, pervonacharnyi tekst)". In Gudzii, N. K. (ed.). Starinnaia russkaia povest': Stat'i i issledovaniia (in Russian). Moscow and Leningrad. pp. 7–37.
- Dimnik, Martin (January 2004). "The Title "Grand Prince" in Kievan Rus'". Mediaeval Studies. 66: 253–312. doi:10.1484/J.MS.2.306512.
- Gippius, Alexey A. (2014). "Reconstructing the original of the Povesť vremennyx let: a contribution to the debate". Russian Linguistics. 38 (3). Springer: 341–366. doi:10.1007/s11185-014-9137-y. JSTOR 43945126. S2CID 255017212.
- Halperin, Charles J. (2001). "Text and Textology: Salmina's Dating of the Chronicle Tales about Dmitrii Donskoi". Slavonic and East European Review. 79 (2): 248–263. doi:10.1353/see.2001.0046. S2CID 247621602.
- Halperin, Charles J. (2022). The Rise and Demise of the Myth of the Rus' Land (PDF). Leeds: Arc Humanities Press. p. 107. ISBN 9781802700565. Archived from the original (PDF) on 23 June 2023.
- Kloss, Boris (2007). "Copies of the Hypatian Chronicle and Their Textology". Harvard Ukrainian Studies. 29 (1). Translated by DiMauro, Giorgio. Harvard Ukrainian Research Institute: 129–147. JSTOR 41304504.
- Heinrich, Lisa Lynn (1977). The Kievan Chronicle: A Translation and Commentary (PhD diss.). Vanderbilt University. ProQuest 7812419
- Isoaho, Mari (2018). "Shakhmatov's Legacy and the Chronicles of Kievan Rus'". Kritika: Explorations in Russian and Eurasian History. 19 (3). Slavica Publishers: 637–648. doi:10.1353/kri.2018.0033. S2CID 159688925.
- Lunt, Horace G. (Summer 1988). "On Interpreting the Russian Primary Chronicle: The Year 1037". The Slavic and East European Journal. 32 (2): 251–264. doi:10.2307/308891. JSTOR 308891.
- Lunt, Horace G. (June 1994). "Lexical Variation in the Copies of the Rus' "Primary Chronicle": Some Methodological Problems". Ukrainian Philology and Linguistics. 18 (1–2). Harvard Ukrainian Research Institute: 10–28. JSTOR 41036551.
- Ostrowski, Donald (March 1981). "Textual Criticism and the Povest' vremennykh let: Some Theoretical Considerations". Harvard Ukrainian Studies. 5 (1). Harvard Ukrainian Research Institute: 11–31. JSTOR 41035890.
- Ostrowski, Donald (2018). "Was There a Riurikid Dynasty in Early Rus'?". Canadian-American Slavic Studies. 52 (1): 30–49. doi:10.1163/22102396-05201009.
- Plokhy, Serhii (2006). The Origins of the Slavic Nations: Premodern Identities in Russia, Ukraine, and Belarus (PDF). New York: Cambridge University Press. pp. 10–15. ISBN 978-0-521-86403-9. Archived (PDF) from the original on 6 June 2011.
  - Halperin, Charles J. (2010). "Review Article. "National Identity in Premodern Rus'"". Russian History (Brill journal). 37 (3). Brill Publishers: 275–294. doi:10.1163/187633110X510446. Archived from the original on 26 March 2023. (review of Plokhy 2006, and a response to criticism)
- Thuis, Hans (2015). Nestorkroniek. De oudste geschiedenis van het Kievse Rijk (in Dutch). Nijmegen: Uitgeverij Vantilt. p. 304. ISBN 9789460042287.

=== Further reading ===
- Inés García de la Puente, "Beyond the Sea: On the Use of за море in the Primary Chronicle". Ruthenica. 16. 28–36. 2022.
