= Westcott and Hort =

Greek-language version of the New Testament

The New Testament in the Original Greek
- Author: Brooke Foss Westcott; Fenton John Anthony Hort
- Language: Koine Greek
- Subject: New Testament textual criticism
- Genre: Critical edition of the Bible
- Published: 1881 (main text); 1882 (Introduction and Appendix by Hort); 1892 (revised edition by F. C. Burkitt)
- Publication date: 1881
- Media type: Print

The New Testament in the Original Greek is a Greek-language version of the New Testament published in 1881. It is also known as the Westcott and Hort text, after its editors Brooke Foss Westcott (1825–1901) and Fenton John Anthony Hort (1828–1892). Textual scholars use the abbreviations "WH" or "WHNU". It is a critical text, compiled from some of the oldest New Testament fragments and texts that had been discovered at the time.

Westcott and Hort state: "[It is] our belief that even among the numerous unquestionably spurious readings of the New Testament there are no signs of deliberate falsification of the text for dogmatic purposes." They find that without orthographic differences, doubtful textual variants exist only in one sixtieth of the whole New Testament (with most of them being comparatively trivial variations), with the substantial variations forming hardly more than one thousandth of the entire text.

According to Hort, "Knowledge of Documents should precede Final Judgments upon Readings". The two editors favoured two manuscripts: Vaticanus and Sinaiticus. They also believed that the combination of Codex Bezae with the Old Latin and the Old Syriac represents the original form of the New Testament text, especially when it is shorter than other forms of the text, such as the majority of the Byzantine text-type. In this they followed one of the primary principles of their fledgling textual criticism, lectio brevior, sometimes taken to an extreme, as in the theory of Western non-interpolations, which has since been rejected.

== WH edition ==
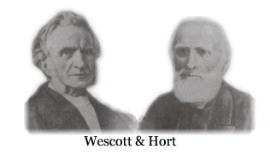
Brooke Foss Westcott and Fenton John Anthony Hort

Westcott and Hort distinguished four text types in their studies. The most recent is the Syrian, or Byzantine text-type (eastern), of which the newest example is the Textus Receptus and thus from the critical text view is less likely reliable. The Western text-type is much older, but tends to paraphrase, so according to the critical text view also lacks dependability. The Alexandrian text-type, exemplified in the Codex Ephraemi, exhibits a polished Greek style. The two scholars identified their favorite text type as "Neutral text", exemplified by two 4th-century manuscripts, the Codex Vaticanus (known to scholars since the 15th century), and the Codex Sinaiticus (discovered in 1859), both of which they relied on heavily (albeit not exclusively) for this edition. This text has only a few changes of the original. This edition is based on the critical works especially of Tischendorf and Tregelles. The minuscules play a minimal role in this edition.

Westcott and Hort worked on their Testament from 1853 until its completion in 1881. It was followed by an Introduction and Appendix by Hort appearing in a second volume in 1882. In 1892, a revised edition was released by F. C. Burkitt.

== Reception ==
The edition of Westcott and Hort began a new epoch in the history of textual criticism. Most critical editions published after Westcott and Hort share their preference of the Alexandrian text-type and therefore are similar to The New Testament in the Original Greek. An exception is the text edited by Hermann von Soden. Soden's edition stands much closer to the text of Tischendorf than to the text of Westcott and Hort. All editions of Nestle-Aland remain close in textual character to the text WH. Aland reports that, while NA25 text shows, for example, 2,047 differences from von Soden, 1,996 from Vogels, 1,268 from Tischendorf, 1,161 from Bover, and 770 from Merk, it contains only 558 differences from WH text.

According to Bruce M. Metzger, "the general validity of their critical principles and procedures is widely acknowledged by scholars today." In 1981 Metzger said:

The international committee that produced the United Bible Societies Greek New Testament, not only adopted the Westcott and Hort edition as its basic text, but followed their methodology in giving attention to both external and internal consideration.

— Brooks 1999, p. 264

Philip Comfort gave this opinion:

The text produced by Westcott and Hort is still to this day, even with so many more manuscript discoveries, a very close reproduction of the primitive text of the New Testament. Of course, I think they gave too much weight to Codex Vaticanus alone, and this needs to be tempered. This criticism aside, the Westcott and Hort text is extremely reliable. ... In many instances where I would disagree with the wording in the Nestle / UBS text in favor of a particular variant reading, I would later check with the Westcott and Hort text and realize that they had often come to the same decision. ... Of course, the manuscript discoveries of the past one hundred years have changed things, but it is remarkable how often they have affirmed the decisions of Westcott and Hort.

— Comfort 2005, p. 100

Puskas & Robbins (2012) noted that, despite significant advancements since 1881, the text of the NA27 differs much more from the Textus Receptus than from Westcott and Hort, stating that 'the contribution of these Cambridge scholars appears to be enduring.'

== Published editions ==
- The New Testament In The Original Greek. New York: Harper and Brothers. 1882.
- The New Testament In The Original Greek. New York: MacMillan. 1925.

== Other editions of Greek New Testament ==
The texts of Nestle-Aland, and of Bover and Merk, differ very little from the text of the Westcott-Hort.

== See also ==
- Editio Regia
- Novum Instrumentum omne
- Editio Octava Critica Maior
- Novum Testamentum Graece
