= Ioachim Chronicle =

The Ioachim Chronicle or Ioakim Chronicle (Russian: Иоакимовская Летопись, romanized: Ioakimovskaja Letopisʹ), also spelled Joachim or Ioakim) is a chronicle allegedly discovered by the Russian Imperial historian Vasily Tatishchev in the 18th century. The alleged Ioachim Chronicle, which has never been found, is part of the "Tatishchev information" (Russian: Татищевские известия, romanized: Tatishchevskie izvestiya), which is not to be trusted until it is supported by another source.

== Discovery ==
Russian historian Vasily Tatishchev reported in 1748 that after he was looking for old chronicles, he received from his friend the Archimandrite Melchizedek Borshchev, a manuscript described as an ancient chronicle attributed to Ioakim Korsunianin, traditionally identified as the first bishop of Novgorod. The text of the manuscript suppously had been composed around the year 1000. According to Tatishchev, the manuscript was incomplete but contained material not found in the Primary Chronicle.

Tatishchev treated it cautiously and published excerpts on contents separately within his History of Russia. He reported that the manuscript was returned to the Archimandrite (who died in the year that the chronicle was discovered), and he wouldn't find it again.

== Contents ==
The philologist Gorlin has divided the contents of the Chronicle in two parts: The first part contains a narrative of the pre-Rurikid period, presented in full in Tatishchev' book.A second part covers the period from Rurik to Vladimir and was presented only in excerpts when it differed from other chronicles.

The presentation of the prehistory of the Slavs is similar to polish chronicles from the XVI century, but then diverges to present the exploits of early Slavic rulers such Sloven (from Japhet line) who founded Novgorod. His descendant, Vandal, conquers nearby tribes and defeat some vassals. His son Vladimir inherit the domain and married a Varangian princess, Advinda. Vladimir's ninth successor, Burivoj fought the Varangians and expanded his country until the river Kymi. He was defeated and forced to take refuge on a fortified island in the middle of a lake. The varangians ravage the land and the slavs elected Gostomysl, son of Borivoj, as new prince.

Ioachim Chronicle focused on the figure of Gostomysl, giving more information and narrating that he driven out the Varangians from Novgorod and secured a long peace for his country. He founded the city of Vyborg after his elder so Vybor. His sons died before him and her daughters had married foreign princes. Gostomysl asked the sorcerers of Kolmogard about his dilemma. He dreamed about a big tree emerging from his middle daughter Umlla. The sorcerers interpreted the dream as the birth of a prince who would inherit the land (Rurik).

Later, the chronicle mentioned the marriage of Rurik to the Varangian princess Efanda. He would give her the land of Ingria after the birth of their son igor.

== Authenticity ==
The chronicle has been alleged to be a 17th-century compilation of earlier sources describing events in the 10th and 11th centuries concerning the Novgorod Republic and Kievan Rus'.

The original chronicle was reportedly lost and the contents are known through Tatishchev's History of Russia (История Российская). However, Tatishchev's historiography is dubious, since his second (printed) redaction of his History of Russia is much more detailed than his first (handwritten) redaction and is based on sources no longer, and some say never, extant. Indeed, Tatishchev's sources are so problematic, that Iakov Solomonovich Lur'e (1968) wrote of "'Tatishchev information' (data found only in that historian.)" Be that as it may, Tatishchev concluded that the chronicle was written by Ioakim Korsunianin, the first bishop of Veliky Novgorod (ca. 988–1030). Some other Soviet studies suggested that the chronicle was more likely compiled by the Patriarch Joachim of Moscow (d. 1690).

== Bibliography ==
- Luria, J. (1968). "Problems of Source Criticism (with Reference to Medieval Russian Documents)". Slavic Review. 27 (1). Cambridge University Press: 1–22. doi:10.2307/2493909. ISSN 0037-6779. JSTOR 2493909. (Written by Iakov Solomonovich Lur'e, Яков Соломонович Лурье. Translated from Russian to English by Michael Cherniavsky).
- Ostrowski, Donald (2018). "Was There a Riurikid Dynasty in Early Rus'?". Canadian-American Slavic Studies. 52 (1): 30–49. doi:10.1163/22102396-05201009.
- Gorlin, Michel (1939). "La Chronique de Joachim". Revue des Études Slaves. 19 (1–2): 40–51. doi:10.3406/slave.1939.7689.
- Tolochko, Oleksiy Petrovych (2005). "История Российская" Василия Татищева: источники и известия "Istoriia Rossiiskaia" Vasiliia Tatishcheva: istochniki i izvestiia [Vasily Tatishchev's "History of Russia": Sources and Information]. Moscow: Новое литературное обозрение Novoe literaturnoe obozrenie. p. 543. ISBN 979-5-867-93346-2. ISBN 9795867933462 (also published at Krytyka, Kyiv, 2005)
