= Kondakov Seminar =

The Kondakov Seminar was an academic organisation founded by Russian exiles on 22 April 1925 in Prague, named after Nikodim Kondakov shortly following his death.

The first directors were Alexander Kalitinsky and George Vernadsky – until he left for Yale University in 1927. They received funding from Charles Crane for the initial book celebrating the work of Kondakov.
