= Vasily Tatishchev =

Russian historian and statesman (1686–1750)

- Василий Татищев
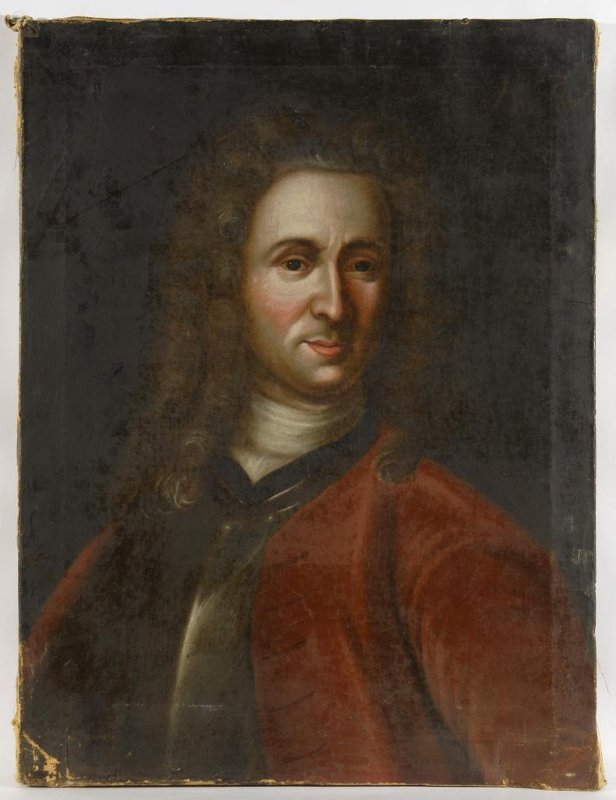
- Tatishchev, a portrait by an unknown painter, 1780s
- Born: 19 April 1686; Boredki, Ostrovsky Uyezd, Pskov Governorate, Russian Empire
- Died: 15 July 1750 (aged 64); Boldino, Dmitrovsky Uyezd, Moscow Governorate, Russian Empire
- Education: Jacob Bruce Moscow Artillery and Engineering School
- Occupations: historian, geographer, ethnographer, linguist, statesman
- Known for: Book on Russian history
- Spouse: Anna Vasilyevna Andreevskaya
- Children: Eupraksiya Tatishcheva (1715–1769); Eugraf Tatishchev (1717–1781)
- Parents: Nikita Alekseevich Tatishchev (died 1706) (father); Fetinya Andreevna Arshenevskaya (mother)
- Family: Tatishchev family

Vasily Nikitich Tatishchev (sometimes spelt Tatischev; Russian: Василий Никитич Татищев, IPA: [vɐˈsʲilʲɪj nʲɪˈkʲitʲɪtɕ tɐˈtʲiɕːɪf]; 19 April 1686 – 15 July 1750) was a Russian statesman, historian, philosopher, and ethnographer. He is known as the author of a book on Russian history titled The History of Russia (Russian: История Российская, romanized: Istoriya Rossiyskaya), posthumously published in 1767. He also founded three cities in the Russian Empire: Stavropol-on-Volga (now known as Tolyatti), Yekaterinburg, and Perm.

Tatishchev often did not cite his sources, which required later critical historians to find out where he got his information from. After several sources were discovered, the texts of Tatishchev which remained unaccounted for (such as the alleged Ioachim Chronicle, which has never been found) became known as "Tatishchev information" (Russian: Татищевские известия, romanized: Tatishchevskiye izvestiya), which is not to be trusted until it is supported by another extant source.

== Life ==
Tatishchev was born near Pskov on 19 April 1686. The young Tatishchev was homeschooled, being taught German and Polish. As an adult, he also studied some French and Latin, though he never mastered these two language very well. Having graduated from the Artillery and Engineering school in Moscow, he took part in the 1700–1721 Great Northern War with Sweden. In the service of Peter the Great he gained a prominent post in the Foreign Office, which he used to oppose the policies of the Supreme Privy Council and support Anna's ascension to the Russian throne in 1730.

He was entrusted by Anna with a lucrative office of the management of Ural factories. At that post he founded the cities of Perm and Yekaterinburg, which have since grown into the veritable capitals of the Urals. A monument to him was opened in Perm in 2003. During the Bashkir War of 1735-40 he was in command of Siberian operations from the winter of 1736-37 and head of the whole operation from the spring of 1737. He was removed from command after March 1739, nominally on charges of corruption, but mainly because he had made too many enemies. Tatishchev finished his official career as a governor of Astrakhan (1741–44). He died at the Boldino estate near Moscow on 15 July 1750.

== Work ==
Having retired from active service, the elderly statesman dedicated himself to scholarly pursuits. Feeling that the Russian historiography had been neglected, he discovered and published several legal monuments of great interest, e.g., the Russkaya Pravda and the Sudebnik of 1550. His magnum opus was the first sketch of Russian history, entitled Russian History Dating Back to the Most Ancient Times and published in 5 volumes after his death. He also compiled the first encyclopedic dictionary of the Russian language.

The scientific merits of Tatishchev's work were disputed even in the 18th century. German historian August Ludwig von Schlözer (1735–1809) wrote that '[Tatishchev had] no training, did not know a single word of Latin, and did not even understand any modern language other than German'. However, American historian Edward C. Thaden (1986) said this criticism was somewhat exaggerated, given his knowledge of German and Polish, but poor understanding of French and Latin; nevertheless, his military and administrative training and experience did bring him some expertise in those fields.

Russian historian Nikolay Karamzin (1766–1826) called all unsourced or poorly sourced claims by Tatishchev "inventions" and "fantasies". It is true that he used some chronicles that have since been lost, but most of them, most notoriously the Ioachim Chronicle, were of dubious authenticity, and may never have existed in the first place. This led Soviet historian Iakov S. Lur'e (1968) to write of "Tatishchev information", which he defined as "data found only in that historian", that should be approached with skepticism and extreme caution. It is also true that he could never tell a genuine work from a fake, and some incidents inserted in his history could have been products of his own fancy.

== Memorialization ==
=== Places ===
Several inhabited locations in Saratov Oblast, Samara Oblast and Orenburg Oblast are named after Tatishchev.

=== Monuments ===
- In 1998 a large equestrian statue of Tatishchev was established in Tolyatti.
- In 1998 in Yekaterinburg at Plotinka (the dam of the city pond on the Iset River) a monument was erected in honour of the founders of Yekaterinburg titled "Glorious sons of Russia V.N. Tatishchev and W. de Gennin, Yekaterinburg is thankful, 1998" (rus. Славным сынам России В. Н. Татищеву и В. И. де Геннину Екатеринбург благодарный 1998 год). The author of the monument is the sculptor Peter Chusovitin.

=== Other ===
- An award n.a. Tatishcheva and de Gennin was established in Yekaterinburg.
- Mount Tatishchev is the highest point in the territory of modern Yekaterinburg.
- In 1985 a postal envelope dedicated to Tatishchev was issued.
- In 1991 in USSR as part of "Russian historians stamp series" a stamp depicting Vasily Tatishchev was issued.
- A small planet, after being discovered on 27 September 1978 by the Soviet astronomer L.I. Chernykh at the Crimean Astrophysical Observatory, was named after Tatishchev - (4235) Tatishchev.

== See also ==
- Tatishchev family

== Bibliography ==
- Anikin, Andréi : Los Pensadores Rusos. Ideas Socioeconómicas en la Rusia de los Siglos XVIII y XIX, Editorial Progreso, pp. 34–37, URRSS, Moscow, 1990.
- Iukht, A.I., "Tatishchev Vasilii Nikitich," in A.A. Chernobaev et al. (eds.), Istoriki Rossii biografii. Moscow: ROSSPEN, 2001; pp. 7–14.
- Deutch G. M.: Vasily Nikitich Tatischev. Sverdlovsk, 1962.
- Luria, J. (1968). "Problems of Source Criticism (with Reference to Medieval Russian Documents)". Slavic Review. 27 (1). Cambridge University Press: 1–22. doi:10.2307/2493909. ISSN 0037-6779. JSTOR 2493909. (Written by Iakov Solomonovich Lur'e, Яков Соломонович Лурье. Translated from Russian to English by Michael Cherniavsky).
- Ostrowski, Donald (2018). "Was There a Riurikid Dynasty in Early Rus'?". Canadian-American Slavic Studies. 52 (1): 30–49. doi:10.1163/22102396-05201009.
- Peshtich S. L.: Russian historiography of the 18th century, vol. 1-2. Leningrad, 1961, 1965.
- Popov N.: Tatischev and His Time. Moscow, 1861.
- Thaden, Edward C. (1986). "V. N. Tatishchev, German historians, and the St. Petersburg Academy of Sciences". Russian History. 13 (4). Brill: 367–398. doi:10.1163/187633186X00160. ISSN 0094-288X. JSTOR 24655857.
- Tolochko, Oleksiy Petrovych (2005). "История Российская" Василия Татищева: источники и известия "Istoriia Rossiiskaia" Vasiliia Tatishcheva: istochniki i izvestiia [Vasily Tatishchev's "History of Russia": Sources and Information]. Moscow: Новое литературное обозрение Novoe literaturnoe obozrenie. p. 543. ISBN 979-5-867-93346-2. ISBN 9795867933462 (also published at Krytyka, Kyiv, 2005)
