= Tetyana Vilkul =

Ukrainian historian

Tetyana Leonidivna Vilkul (Note: Also variously transcribed Tatiana, Tat'iana, Tat'yana etc., especially when translated from her name in Russian-language publications, Russian: Татьяна Леонидовна Вилкул.) (Ukrainian: Тетяна Леонідівна Вілкул; born 12 January 1969) is a Ukrainian historian specialising in medieval Ukrainian history, and a senior research fellow of the Institute of History of Ukraine. She is known as one of the scholars who reinvigorated scientific interest and research efforts into textual criticism of the Primary Chronicle (PVL) in the early 21st century.

== Biography ==
Full text of Vilkul's 2015 book The Chronicle and the Chronograph

Vilkul was born on 12 January 1969 in Irpin, Kyiv Oblast, Ukrainian SSR. In 1992, she graduated from the National Pedagogical Drahomanov University in Kyiv. Working as an archeographer from 1992 to 1995, she continued her studies at the Institute of Ukrainian Archeography of the National Academy of Sciences of Ukraine. In 2002, she obtained her master of historical sciences at the Department of Medieval and Early Modern History of Ukraine under supervision of Oleksiy Tolochko. Vilkul has published various monographs and papers in Ukrainian, Russian, and English.

Interest in textual criticism of the Primary Chronicle declined in the second half of the 20th century, but was given a new impulse at the beginning of the 21st century by the publication of a new modern German translation by Ludolf Müller in 2001, an interlinear collation of the six main copies and a paradosis by Donald Ostrowski et al. in 2003, and various early 2000s publications by Oleksiy Tolochko and Tetyana Vilkul from the Centre of Kievan Rus' Studies (Ukrainian: Сектор досліджень історії Київської Русі) in Kyiv. These early-21st-century publications were the first to challenge the core parts of Aleksey Shakhmatov's views, which had until then been widely accepted.

In 2004, Vilkul raised several issues with the textological basis of Ostrowski's 2003 reconstruction of the Primary Chronicle. The subsequent polemic between Ostrowski and Vilkul revolved around assessing the stemmatics of the PVL, and the most likely genetic relationships and contaminations between the various textual witnesses, with Gippius (2014) stating that 'Vilkul's approach seems the most promising at present.'

In her doctoral dissertation, The Chronicle and the Chronograph (2015), Vilkul demonstrated that the Novgorod First Chronicle in the Younger Redaction (Younger NPL) has been contaminated by the PVL, so that the PVL text must necessarily be older, and the Younger NPL text reflected the 14th- or 15th-century chronographs and could not be an archetype for the PVL text.

Finnish historical researcher Mari Isoaho (2018) called Vilkul 'a diligent writer' who has published an 'impressive list' of articles on textual criticism of chronicles and other Old Rus' texts, mostly in the Palaeoslavica journal between 2003 and 2012.

== Publications ==
=== Monographs ===
- Літопис і хронограф. Студії з текстології домонгольського київського літописання. Litopys i khronohraf: Studiï z tekstolohiï domonhol's'koho kyïvs'koho litopysannja (The Chronicle and the Chronograph: Textual Criticism Studies of Pre-Mongol Kyivan Chronicles). 518 pp. Kyiv: National Academy of Sciences of Ukraine, 2015. ISBN 978-9660275546. (doctoral dissertation)

=== Journal articles (selection) ===
- Vilkul, T. (2003). "Novgorodskaja pervaja letopis' i Načal'nyj svod". Palaeoslavica, 11, 5–35.
- Vilkul, T. (2004). "Tekstoloģija i Textkritik. Ideal'nyj proekt." Palaeoslavica, 12(1), 171–203.
- Vilkul, T. L. (2013). "Polnyj perevod Xroniki Georgija Amartola v letopisnyx staťjax X–XI vv." (Povesť vremennyx let i Novgorodskaja pervaja letopis' mladšego izvoda). Drevnjaja Rus'. Voprosy medievistiki, 5(47), 28.

== Bibliography ==
- Gippius, Alexey A. (2014). "Reconstructing the original of the Povesť vremennyx let: a contribution to the debate". Russian Linguistics. 38 (3). Springer: 341–366. doi:10.1007/s11185-014-9137-y. JSTOR 43945126. S2CID 255017212.
- Isoaho, Mari (2018). "Shakhmatov's Legacy and the Chronicles of Kievan Rus'". Kritika: Explorations in Russian and Eurasian History. 19 (3). Slavica Publishers: 637–648. doi:10.1353/kri.2018.0033. S2CID 159688925.
