= Mari Isoaho =

Finnish historian (born 1967)

Mari Helena Isoaho (born 18 August 1967) is a Finnish historian, archaeologist and medievalist. She is docent at the University of Helsinki, and specialises in Old East Slavic literature, including the mental imagery, eschatological narratives and textual criticism of the Primary Chronicle (PVL).

== Biography ==
Isoaho received her PhD in General History from the University of Oulu. Her doctoral dissertation The Warrior and Saint. The Image of Aleksandr Nevskiy in Medieval Russia was published by Brill in 2006. Simon Franklin praised it, writing that 'scholars will be grateful to Isoaho for perusing such a range of sources, and for producing a coherent overview of the cultural representations of Aleksandr.' F. B. Schenk remarked the monograph would have benefited from including other recent studies, but lauded Isoaho's profound knowledge on the subject matter and her important research contribution in the field.

In January 2013, Isoaho hosted the international symposium "Past and Present in Medieval Chronicles", a series of lectures by many scholars, in 2015 bundled as conference proceedings under the same title. The common thread of the presentations was the way in which the literary label 'medieval chronicle' influenced descriptions of the past and visions of the future. Amongst other things, it sought to demonstrate that subjectivity and the historical context in which each chronicler is immersed during the composition of his or her work were of fundamental importance to understanding the genre.

In her 2018 review of recent developments in textual criticism of the Primary Chronicle, Isoaho called Ukrainian historian Tetyana Vilkul 'a diligent writer', saying she has published an 'impressive list' of articles on textual criticism of chronicles and other Old Rus' texts, mostly in the Palaeoslavica journal between 2003 and 2012.

== Works ==
=== Monographs ===
- Isoaho, Mari (2006). The Image of Aleksandr Nevskiy in Medieval Russia: Warrior and Saint. Leiden: Brill. p. 428. ISBN 9789047409496. (public version of PhD dissertation).

=== Edited works ===
- Isoaho, Mari, ed. (2015). Past and Present in Medieval Chronicles. Helsinki: Helsinki Collegium for Advanced Studies. p. 195. ISBN 978-951-51-0870-8.

=== Journal articles (selection) ===
- Isoaho, Mari H. (2017). "Battle for Jerusalem in Kievan Rus': Igor's Campaign (1185) and the Battle of Hattin (1187)" (PDF). Palaeoslavica. 25 (2): 38–62.
- Isoaho, Mari (2017). "Yksityiskohdista kokonaisuuteen – Häme Novgorodin kronikoissa" [From the details to the whole – Häme in the Novgorod Chronicles]. Historiallinen aikakauskirja [Historical Journal] (3): 347–352, 354.
- Isoaho, Mari (2018). "Shakhmatov's Legacy and the Chronicles of Kievan Rus'". Kritika: Explorations in Russian and Eurasian History. 19 (3). Slavica Publishers: 637–648. doi:10.1353/kri.2018.0033. S2CID 159688925.
