= Lectio brevior =

Principle in textual criticism

Lectio brevior potior (Latin for "the shorter reading is stronger") is one of the principles in textual criticism, especially biblical textual criticism. The principle is based on a view that scribes showed more tendency to embellish and harmonise by additions and inclusions than by deletions. Hence, when comparing two or more manuscripts of the same text, the shorter readings are considered more likely to be closer to the original.

However, when in the history of manuscript transmission there had been an organized effort to clean the text from later embellishment (as is the case with Alexandrian editions of Homer, for example), the shorter reading may result from such a recensional activity omitting legitimate older readings falsely believed to be later additions. Maurice A. Robinson argued that in practice, scribes don't actually have a habit of continuously expanding text and they often shorten it due to accidental omissions or intentional removals of a perceived difficulty, so the principle has to be abandoned.

== See also ==
- Lectio difficilior potior

== Bibliography ==
- Epp, Eldon J., Gordon D. Fee. Studies in the Theory and Method of New Testament Textual Criticism. William B. Eerdmans Publishing Company, 1993. ISBN 0-8028-2773-X
- Robinson, Maurice A. "New Testament Textual Criticism: The Case for Byzantine Priority." TC: A Journal of Biblical Textual Criticism 6 (2001).
