= NASU Institute of Archaeology =

Soviet-Ukrainian research institute

Coordinates: 50°30′10.7″N 30°30′50.2″E

Institute of Archaeology of Ukraine
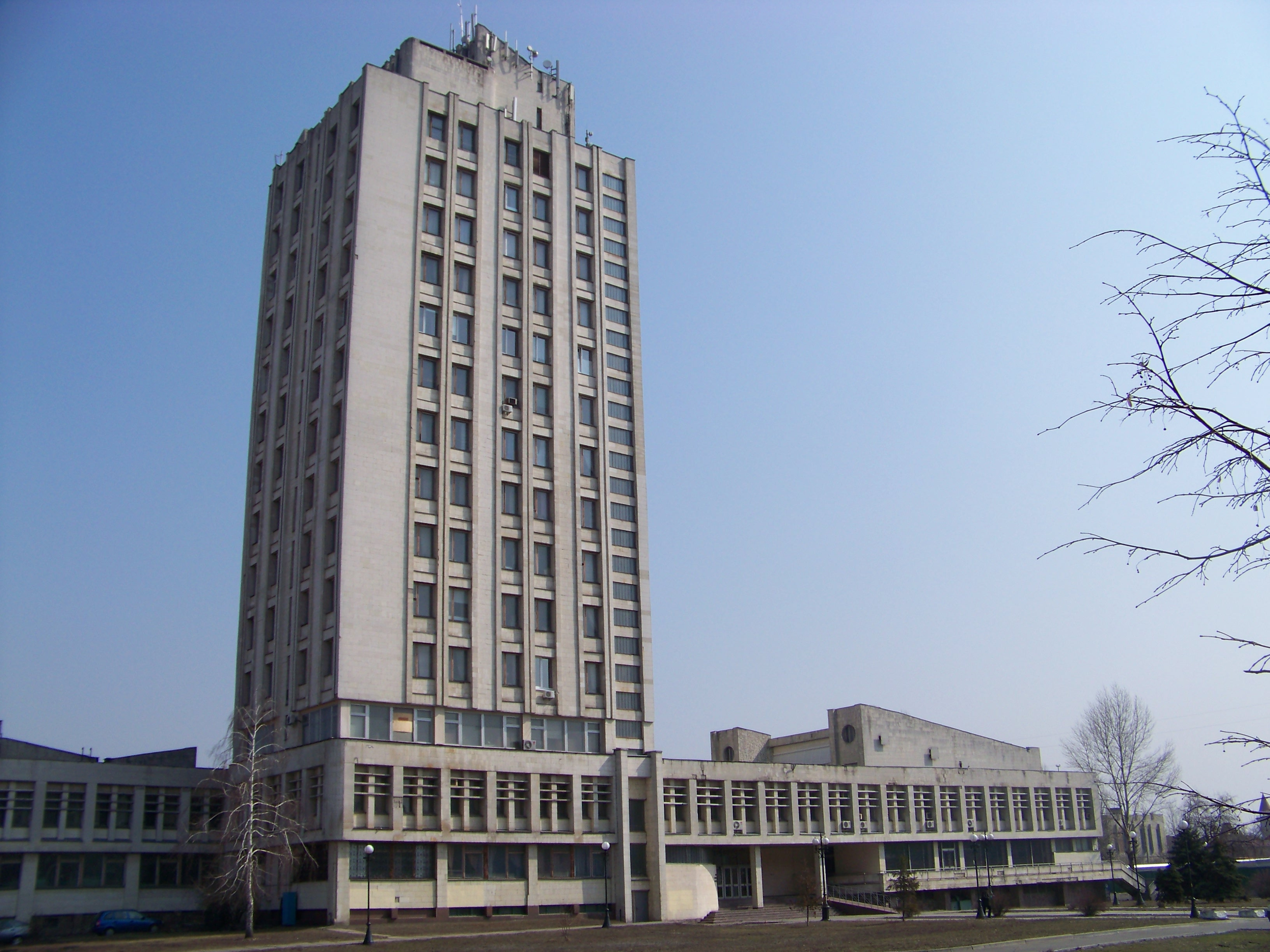
- Institute's main office building in Kyiv
- Established: 1938
- Head: Viktor Chabai
- Address: 12 Volodymyr Ivasiuk avenue
- Location: Kyiv, Ukraine
- Website: www.iananu.org.ua

The Institute of Archaeology of the National Academy of Science of Ukraine (Ukrainian: Інститут археології НАН України, romanized: Instytut arkheolohii NAN Ukrainy) is a research institute in Ukraine that is part of the National Academy of Sciences of Ukraine. It is the main institution with the academy that conducts research in the field of studying archaeology and the ancient history of Ukraine. The institute is part of the department of history, philosophy and law of the National Academy of Sciences of Ukraine. The institute's headquarters is located in Obolonskyi District, Kyiv, near the Dnieper embankment.

The institute was created in 1938 after a reorganization of the institute of the history of the material culture of the Academy of Sciences of the Ukrainian SSR.

In 1938–1993 the institute governed the Olbia excavation site as one of its departments.

At its current location in Obolon, the institute is since 1996 to which it arrived from the Vydubychi Monastery. After its relocation, the institute has reorganized again consisting of 11 departments and in 2005 there was added one more department.

In 2014 the institute was accounted for 133 researchers among which academician Petro Tolochko, corresponding members of the National Academy of Sciences of Ukraine Serhiy Kryzhytskyi, Oleksandr Motsya, Hlib Ivakin, Viktor Chabai and 16 more scientists with a degree of doctor of sciences.

Due to the 2014 Russian aggression against Ukraine and the Russian annexation of Crimea, many scientists were forced to leave the peninsula. The 2014 Russian authorities liquidated the Crimean branch of the Institute of Archaeology. The Ukrainian activist Dmytro Tymchuk noted that archaeologists who illegally conduct excavations are being tracked and will be charged with it eventually. Since April 2014 the Russian Academy of Sciences and the Russian Hermitage Museum has illegally sent numerous archaeological expeditions for excavations in Crimea.
