= George Vernadsky =

Russian-American historian (1887–1973)

George Vladimirovitch Vernadsky
- Георгий Владимирович Вернадский
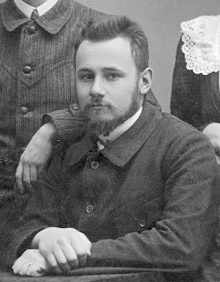
- Vernadsky in 1912
- Born: August 20, 1887; Saint Petersburg, Russian Empire
- Died: June 12, 1973 (aged 85); New Haven, United States
- Education: Imperial Moscow University; University of Freiburg; University of Berlin
- Parent(s): Vladimir Ivanovich Vernadsky (father); Nataliia Yegorovna Staritskaya (mother)
- Scientific career
- Fields: Russian history
- Workplaces: Saint Petersburg University; Russian School of Law; Yale University
- Academic advisors: Heinrich Rickert, Vasily Klyuchevsky, Robert Vipper
- Notable students: John Curtis Perry

Signature
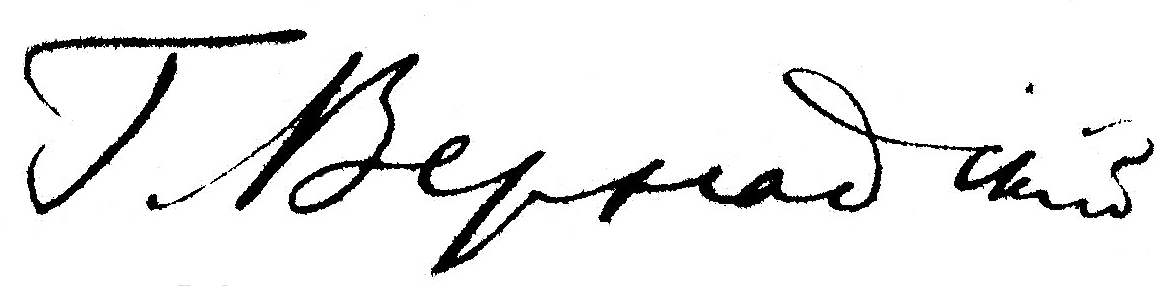

George Vernadsky (Russian: Гео́ргий Влади́мирович Верна́дский; August 20, 1887 – June 12, 1973) was a Russian-born American historian and an author of numerous books on Russian history.

== European years ==
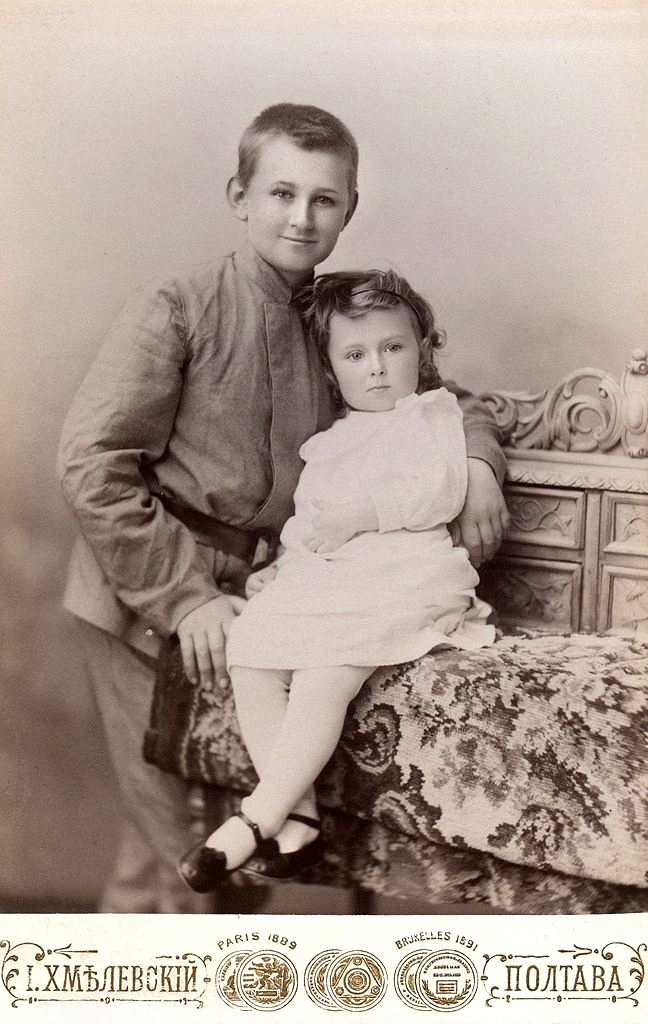
George Vernadsky and his sister Nina

Born in Saint Petersburg on August 20, 1887, Vernadsky stemmed from a respectable family of the Russian intelligentsia. His father was Vladimir Vernadsky, a famous Russian/Ukrainian geologist.

He entered the Moscow University (where his father was professor) in 1905 but, due to the disturbances of the First Russian Revolution, had to spend the next two years in Germany, at the Albert Ludwigs University of Freiburg and the University of Berlin, where he imbibed the doctrines of Heinrich Rickert.

Back in Russia, Vernadsky resumed his course at the Moscow University, graduating with honors in 1910. His instructors included the historians Vasily Klyuchevsky and Robert Vipper. The young scholar declined to continue his career in the university after the 1910 Kasso affair and moved to Saint Petersburg University, where he taught for the next seven years, during which he was awarded the Master's degree for his dissertation on the effects of Freemasonry on the Russian Enlightenment.

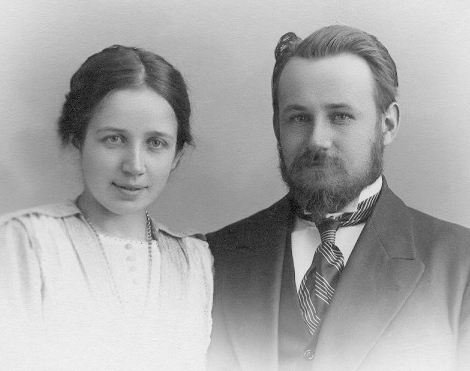
Vernandsky with wife Nina in 1909

Politically close to the kadet party (of which his father was one of the leaders), Vernadsky began his career as a supporter of liberal ideas, authoring the biographies of Nikolai Novikov and Pavel Milyukov. During the years of the Russian Civil War (1917–1920), he lectured for a year in Perm. He then taught in Kiev and then followed the White Army to Simferopol, where he taught at the local university for two years.

After the fall of Crimea to the Bolsheviks in 1920, Vernadsky left his native country for Istanbul, moving to Athens later that year. At the suggestion of Nikodim Kondakov, he settled in Prague, teaching there from 1921 until 1925 at the Russian School of Law. There, in association with Nikolai Trubetzkoy and P.N. Savitsky, he participated in formulating the Eurasian Theory of Russian history. After Kondakov's death, Vernadsky was in charge of the Kondakov Seminar, which disseminated his view of Russian culture as the synthesis of Slavonic, Byzantine, and nomadic influences.

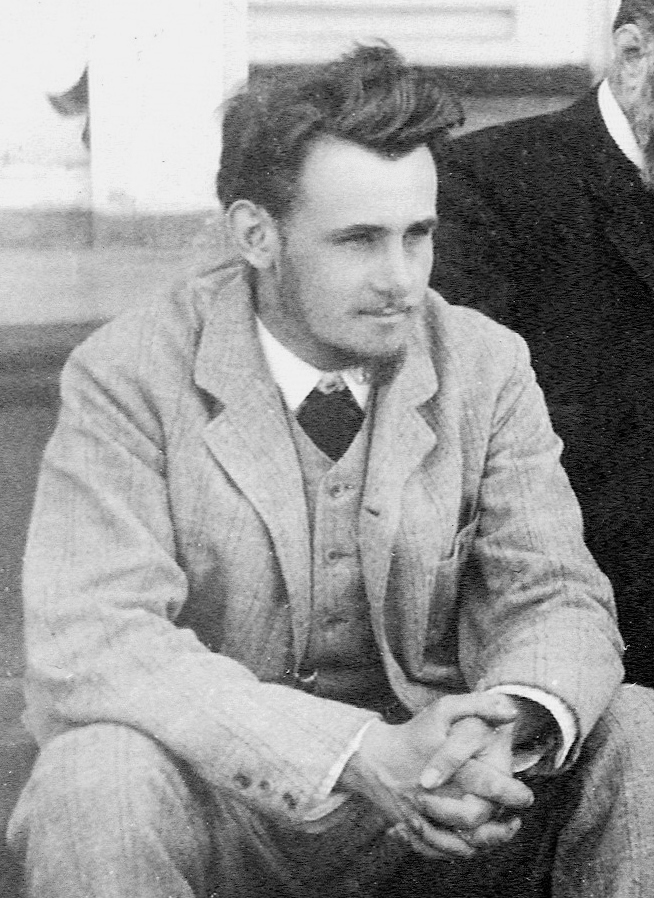
Vernadsky in Poltava in 1908

== American years ==
In 1927, Michael Rostovtzeff and Frank A. Golder offered Vernadsky a position at Yale University in the United States. At Yale, he first served as a research associate in history (1927–1946), and then became a full professor of Russian history in 1946. He served in that position until his retirement in 1956. He died in New Haven on June 12, 1973.

Vernadsky's first book in English was a widely read textbook on Russian history, first published in 1929 and republished six times during his lifetime. It was translated to numerous languages, including Hebrew and Japanese. In 1943, he embarked on his magnum opus, A History of Russia, of which six volumes were eventually published, despite the death of his co-author, Professor Michael Karpovich, in 1959.

== Interpretation of Russian history ==
Vernadsky took a novel approach to Russian history, presenting it as a continuous succession of empires, starting from the Scythian, Sarmatian, Gothic, and Hunnic; Vernadsky attempted to determine the laws of their expansion and collapse. His views emphasized the importance of Eurasian nomadic cultures for Russia's cultural and economic progress, thus anticipating some of the ideas advanced by Lev Gumilev.

Vernadsky became the leading American exponent of depicting Russia as much Asian as European, if not more so. He pointed out many substantial cultural differences between Russia and Europe and praised the success of Russian development along an independent path that revealed its unique character. Vernadsky was a geographical determinist like his Yale colleague Ellsworth Huntington. They assumed that the characteristics of a land defined the character of the people and, indeed, of their government. For that reason, Vernadsky could identify the roots of Russian culture in an ancient period long before the Slavic groups arrived. He thereby undercut the standard claim that modern Russia emerged from Kievan Rus. He emphasized the importance of the Mongol period (1238–1471), as the horde united the vast Eurasian plain under a single ruler. This gave tsarist Russia a strong centralized government and a deep distrust of Europe. Vernadsky was annoyed that Peter the Great tried to Westernize Russia, distorting its natural character. He said Peter only succeeded in polarizing Russia into a Western-oriented elite that conflicted profoundly with the Eurasian peasants. Indeed, Vernadsky argued that this polarization was one of the main weaknesses of the tsarist regime, making it incapable of dealing with the revolutionary movements of the early twentieth century. He celebrated the collapse of the European-style parliamentary government in the October Revolution of 1917 that brought the Bolsheviks to power. Vernadsky was not a liberal, nor was he a Communist sympathizer, but he did admire the Bolsheviks for rebuilding an assertive Russia on non-European lines.

== Critics ==
While G. Vernadsky's writings about the historical past were based upon solid archive sources, his flight from Russia separated him from original materials of the latest periods. Thus, some critics of early editions were doubtful about certain figures and estimates he made for contemporaneousness, pointing out that some of them were rather a guess than hard evidence. After a new, edition of A History of Russia appeared in 1930, S.B. Clough from Columbia University reviewed it in Annals of the American Academy of Political and Social Science:

Most serious criticism of the book seems justified by the discussion of the Soviet period. Professor Vernadsky is a Russian refugee and has not been able to throw off an anti-Bolshevik bias. For example, in discussing the Five Year Plan he says, "In some branches the quality of manufactured products fell below that of output before the war by 30, 40 or even 50 per cent". This is obviously a guess: quality of such various goods as are produced in Russia cannot be reduced to a percentage. In his whole discussion of the Five Year Plan he does not take sufficient account of the labor and capital invested for future production, and in citing Five Year Plan statistics he does not state which Five Year Plan he refers to. Moreover, he compares the figures issued at the end of the first year with those of the preceding year when a better picture would have been given if he had compared them with an index number. The last paragraph of the book seems questionable to the reviewer: "At the outset of the year 1930, the New Economic Policy could be considered completely abrogated. There had begun a new experiment in militant communism."

Iakov Lur'e (1968) accused Vernadsky's Kievan Russia (1948) of uncritically recycling Tatishchev information about an alleged commercial treaty that Vladimir the Great supposedly concluded with the Volga Bulgars in 1006, which is only found in Tatishchev's second (printed) redaction of the Istoriya Rossiyskaya, not in his first redaction, and is not known from any other source, but fits neatly with Tatishchev's own mercantilist theories. Vernadsky knew that S. L. Peshtich had written an article in 1946 arguing that there is no evidence of such a treaty, 'but [Vernadsky] neither accepted its conclusions nor refuted them in any way.' Similarly, Vernadsky wrote that 'Tatishchev's data fit well into the general historical picture' about Roman of Smolensk and Konstantin of Suzdal founding schools in the 12th and 13th centuries, even though this is only recorded in Tatishchev's second redaction, nowhere else, and seems to conveniently echo Tatishchev's Enlightenment ideas about the importance of education, rather than reflecting historical sources.

== Reviews ==
- Clough, S.B. (1931). "Review of A History of Russia, by G. Vernadsky". The Annals of the American Academy of Political and Social Science. 154 (1): 191. doi:10.1177/000271623115400177. JSTOR 1017974.

== Bibliography ==
- A History of Russia. Translated by George A. Nebolsine. New Haven: Yale University Press. 1929 – via Internet Archive.
- Lenin: Red Dictator. Translated by Malcolm Waters Davis. New Haven: Yale University Press. 1931 – via Internet Archive.
- Political and Diplomatic History of Russia. Boston: Little, Brown and Company. 1936 – via Internet Archive.
- (1943–69) A History of Russia (Yale Press) ISBN 0-300-00247-5
- Medieval Russian Laws. Translated by George Vernadsky. New York: Columbia University Press. 1947 – via Internet Archive.; reprinted 1965.
- (1948, repub. 1973) Kievan Russia (Yale Press) ISBN 0-300-01647-6.
- (1953) The Mongols and Russia
- (1959) The Origins of Russia
