= Oleksiy Tolochko =

Ukrainian historian and medievalist

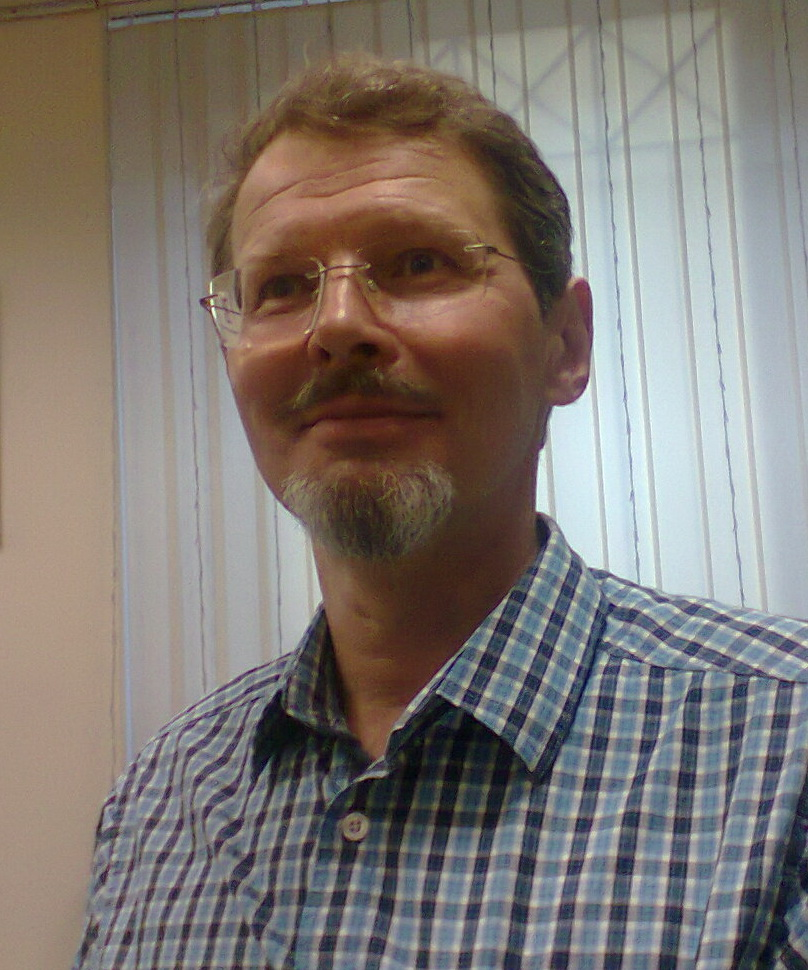
Tolochko in June 2014

Oleksiy Petrovych Tolochko (Ukrainian: Олексі́й Петро́вич Толо́чко; born 7 June 1963) is a Ukrainian historian and medievalist, doctor of historical studies, and corresponding member of the National Academy of Sciences of Ukraine. Tolochko is the director of the Centre of Kievan Rus' Studies (Ukrainian: Сектор досліджень історії Київської Русі) in Kyiv, and is known for his work on textual criticism of the Primary Chronicle.

== Biography ==
Tolochko was born in 1963 in Kyiv (then written as Kiev), in the Ukrainian Soviet Socialist Republic. His father is archaeologist Petro Tolochko, his mother is art critic Tetyana Valeryivna Kara-Vasilyeva; both are members of the National Academy of Sciences as well.

He graduated from secondary school No. 155 in Kyiv (1980) and the Faculty of History of Taras Shevchenko National University of Kyiv (1985).

Tolochko is a member of the Society of East Central European Studies. From August 1985 to October 1987, he was a research intern, from October 1987 to January 1991 a junior researcher, from January to September 1991 a researcher at the Institute of History of Ukraine at the National Academy of Sciences. From September 1991 to February 1996, he served as the Head of the History Department, from February 1996 to January 1997, he was a doctoral student at the NASU Institute of Archaeology. Since January 1997 he has been a senior researcher at the Institute of History. In January 2009, he was elected a corresponding member of the National Academy of Sciences.

He has taught medieval history of Ukraine at the National University of Kyiv-Mohyla Academy and at the Harvard Ukrainian Research Institute in the United States. Tolochko specialises in history, historiography, and public opinion. For a short time, he was the editor-in-chief of the Ukrainian intellectual magazine Krytyka. In the early 21st century, he was one of the leading scholars (along with Tetyana Vilkul, one of his former students) to challenge the traditional consensus that Aleksey Shakhmatov had essentially been correct about how the Primary Chronicle was put together. Tolochko argued that Shakhmatov's idea of layers of pre-existing svods that went all the way back to eyewitness accounts of the events they narrate could no longer be maintained.

== Works ==
=== In Ukrainian (and in Russian) ===
- Нариси початкової Русі. — Київ-СПб.: Laurus, 2015. — 336 с. ISBN 978-966-2449-68-6 (рос./укр.)
- Киевская Русь и Малороссия в ХІХ веке. — К.: Laurus, 2012. — 256 с.
- Котляр М. Ф., Толочко О. П. Чи існувала «балтійська цивілізація» раннього середньовіччя? / Славяне и скандинавы. — М.: Прогресс, 1986. — 411 с. // Український Історичний Журнал (Ukrainian Historical Journal). — Київ, «Наукова думка», 1987. — № 10. — c.148-152
- З приводу скальдичних традицій у творчості Віщого Бояна // Український Історичний Журнал (Ukrainian Historical Journal). — Київ, «Наукова думка», 1987. — № 8. — c.121-125
- З історії політичної думки Русі ХІ-ХІІ ст. // Український Історичний Журнал (Ukrainian Historical Journal). — Київ, «Наукова думка», 1988. — № 9. — c.70-77
- Наукова конференція «Давня Русь і християнство». [ м. Київ ] // Український Історичний Журнал (Ukrainian Historical Journal). — Київ, «Наукова думка», 1988. — № 7. — c.157-158
- Петро-Акерович — Гаданий митрополит всея Руси // Український Історичний Журнал (Ukrainian Historical Journal). — Київ, «Наукова думка», 1990. — № 6. — c.45-54
- «Князь в Древней Руси: власть, собственность, идеология» — К.: «Наукова думка», 1992
- «Русь» очима «України»: в пошуках самоідентифікації та континуїтету // Сучасність (Modernity). — 1994.-N1. — С.111-117.
- «Проща до святих місць» у російській культурі та політиці Х1Х століття // Сучасність (Modernity). — 1994.-N9. — С.106-114.
- «Roman Mstyslavic's Constitutional Project of 1203: Authentic Document or Falsification?» Harvard Ukrainian Studies Journal 18(3/4) December 1994: 249—274.
- Конституційний проект Романа Мстиславича 1203 р.: спроба джерелознавчого дослідження // Український Історичний Журнал (Ukrainian Historical Journal). — 1995.-N6. — С.22-37.
- Толочко О. П. СИМОНОВ Р. А., ТУРИЛОВ А. А., ЧЕРНЕЦОВ А. В. Древнерусская книжность (естественнонаучные и сокровенные знания в России XVI в., связанные с Иваном Рыковым). — М.: Изд-во МГАП, 1994. — 168 с.: ил. // Український Історичний Журнал (Ukrainian Historical Journal). — Київ, «Наукова думка», 1997. — № 1. — c.128-129
- Про місце смерті Рюрика Ростиславича // Український Історичний Журнал (Ukrainian Historical Journal). — 1997.-N5. — С.136-144.
- «Київська Русь» (К., в-во «Альтернатива», 1998)
- Воображенная народность: (Етнічні процеси у середньовічному слов'янському світі: матеріали «круглого столу») // Український Історичний Журнал (Ukrainian Historical Journal). — 2001.-N3. — С.29-34.
- Принимал ли Роман Мстиславич посольство папы Иннокентия III // RUTHENICA. — Київ: Інститут історії України НАН України, 2003. — № 2. — c.195-204
- Верстюк В. Ф., Горобець В. М., Толочко О. П. Україна і Росія в історичній ретроспективі. Т. 1. Українські проекти в Російській імперії. / Інститут історії України НАН України. — К.: Наук. думка, 2004. — 504 с. ISBN 966-00-0330-7
- «Києво-руська спадщина в історичній думці України початку ХІХ ст.», В. Ф. Верстюк, В. М. Горбець, О. П. Толочко, Українські проекти в Російській Імперії. Київ, 2004. С. 250—331.
- «Historia Rossica» Василя Татищева" (К. 2005).
- Пририсовки зверей к миниатюрам Радзивиловской летописи и проблема происхождения рукописи // RUTHENICA. — Київ: Інститут історії України НАН України, 2005. — № 4. — c.62-84
- Одна заимствованная формула в Галицко-Волынской летописи // RUTHENICA. — Київ: Інститут історії України НАН України, 2006. — № 5. — c.256-257
- О галицком боярине Жирославе, его венце и убожестве // RUTHENICA. — Київ: Інститут історії України НАН України, 2006. — № 5. — c.252-255
- О заглавии Повести временных лет // RUTHENICA. — Київ: Інститут історії України НАН України, 2006. — № 5. — c.248-251
- О времени создания Киевского свода «1200г.» // RUTHENICA. — Київ: Інститут історії України НАН України, 2006. — № 5. — c.73-87
- О новгородской «гривне серебра» // RUTHENICA. — Київ: Інститут історії України НАН України, 2007. — № 6. — c.359
- Два кириллических граффити Константинопольской Софии // RUTHENICA. — Київ: Інститут історії України НАН України, 2008. — № 7. — c.209
- Галицкие приточники // RUTHENICA. — Київ: Інститут історії України НАН України, 2008. — № 7. — c.201
- Тмутороканский болван // RUTHENICA. — Київ: Інститут історії України НАН України, 2008. — № 7. — c.193
- Перечитывая приписку Сильвестра 1116 г. // RUTHENICA. — Київ: Інститут історії України НАН України, 2008. — № 7. — c.154
- Tolochko, Oleksiy (2005). "История Российская" Василия Татищева: источники и известия "Istoriia Rossiiskaia" Vasiliia Tatishcheva: istochniki i izvestiia [Vasily Tatishchev's "History of Russia": Sources and Information]. Moscow: Новое литературное обозрение Novoe literaturnoe obozrenie. p. 543. ISBN 9795867933462 (also published at Kritika, Kyiv, 2005)
- (under O. Tolochko's editorship; co-authors: V. Aristov, Y. Zatyliuk, K. Kyrychenko, V. Rychka, V. Stavysky, P. Tolochko, T. Vilkul). Halyt︠s︡ʹko-Volynsʹkyĭ litopys: tekstolohii︠a︡ Галицько-волинський літопис: текстологія [The Galician-Volhynian Chronicle: A Text-Critical Inquiry] (in Ukrainian). Kyiv: Akademperiodyka. 2020. p. 929. ISBN 978-966-360-419-0. Textual criticism of the Galician-Volhynian Chronicle.

=== In English ===
- Tolochko, Oleksiy (2007). "On "Nestor the Chronicler"". Harvard Ukrainian Studies. 29 (1). Harvard University: 31–59. JSTOR 41304501.
- Tolochko, Oleksiy (2010). The Hustyn' Chronicle. (Harvard Library of Early Ukrainian Literature: Texts) ISBN 978-1-932650-03-7.
- Garipzanov, Ildar (2011). "Early Christian Scandinavia and the Problem of Eastern Influences". In Garipzanov, Ildar; Tolochko, Oleksiy (eds.). Early Christianity on the Way from the Varangians to the Greeks [Ruthenica. Supplementum 4.]. Natsional'na akademiya nauk Ukrayiny, Instytut Istorii Ukrayiny. pp. 17–32. ISSN 1995-0276.
- Tolochko, Oleksiy (13 September 2016), "Radziwiłł Chronicle", Encyclopedia of the Medieval Chronicle, Brill

== Sources ==
- Ричка В. М. Толочко Олексій Петрович //
- Isoaho, Mari (2018). "Shakhmatov's Legacy and the Chronicles of Kievan Rus'". Kritika: Explorations in Russian and Eurasian History. 19 (3). Slavica Publishers: 637–648. doi:10.1353/kri.2018.0033. S2CID 159688925.
