= Petro Tolochko =

Ukrainian historian (1938–2024)

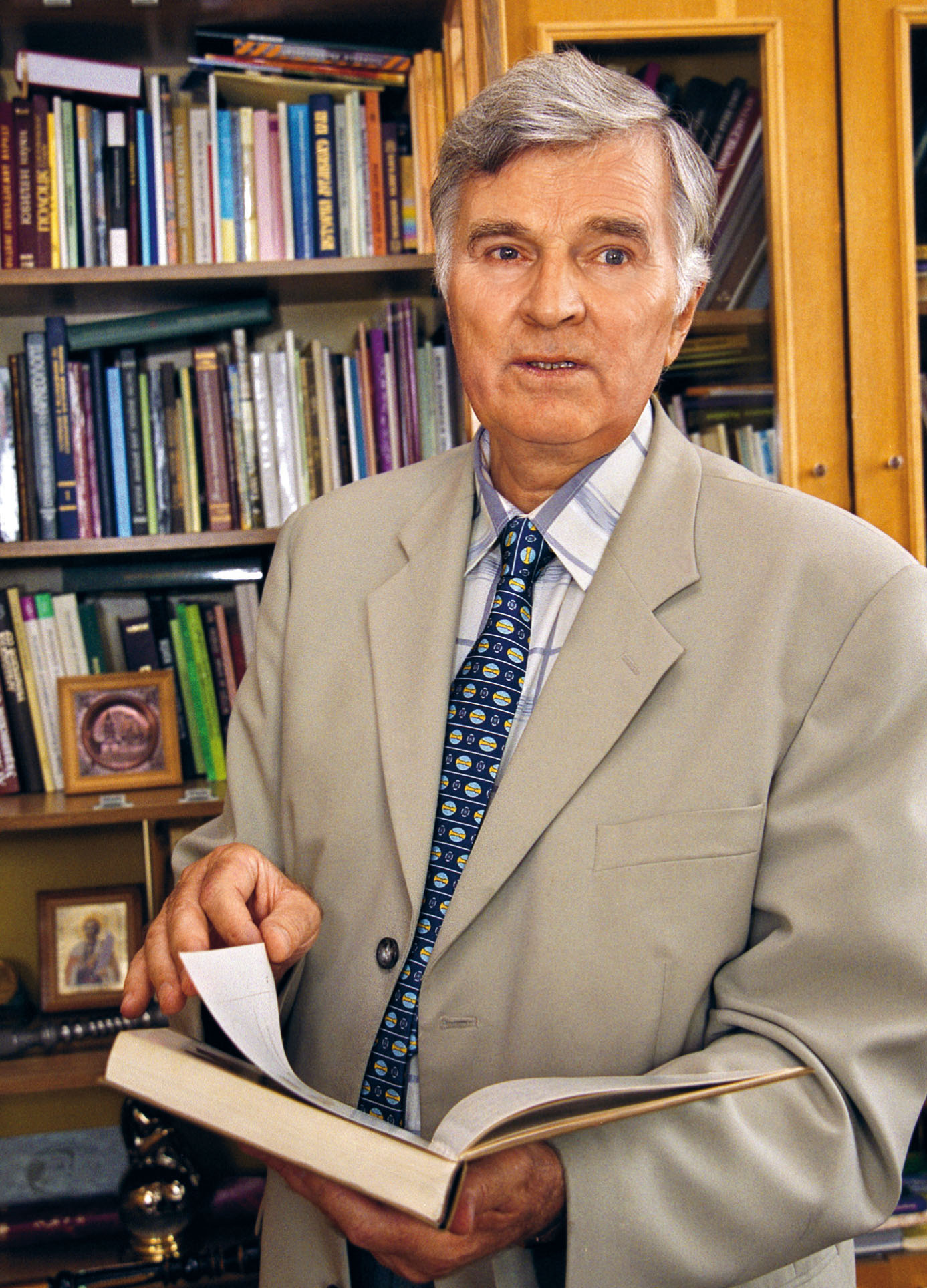
- Tolochko in 2009
- Born: February 21, 1938; Prystromy, Ukrainian SSR, Soviet Union
- Died: April 28, 2024 (aged 86); Kyiv, Ukraine
- Citizenship: Soviet Union (1938–1991) → Ukraine (1991-2024)
- Education: Kiev State University
- Known for: Books about history; political activism
- Awards: Order of the Badge of Honour (1982); Order of Prince Yaroslav the Wise (1998, 2003, 2013); Order of Friendship (2008); Order of Sergius of Radonezh (2009)
- Scientific career
- Fields: Archaeology; medieval history; studies of Old Rus'
- Workplaces: NASU Institute of Archaeology; Russian Academy of Sciences
- Doctoral advisor: Boris Rybakov

Petro Petrovych Tolochko (Ukrainian: Петро́ Петро́вич Толо́чко; 21 February 1938 – 28 April 2024) was a Soviet and Ukrainian historian, archaeologist, and political activist. He was one of the leading specialists in history of the Kievan Rus (Old Rus) and one of leading researchers of the NASU Institute of Archaeology of Ukraine.

Tolochko was a doctor of historical sciences (1981), professor (1982), full member of the National Academy of Sciences of Ukraine (1990), foreign member of the Russian Academy of Sciences (2011, on 8 March 2022 he announced the withdrawal of his membership) and member of the World Russian People's Council.

In Ukraine, Tolochko was heavily criticized for his pro-Russian views and for his disapproval of the country's relations with the EU and NATO. In 2016, he was forced to quit his position as the director of the Institute of Archaeology of the NASU. According to the Russian historian Ruslan Gagkuyev, Petro Tolochko was placed under house arrest in April 2023.

Tolochko died on 28 April 2024, at the age of 86.

== Bibliography ==
- Old Kiev, 1970
- Old Rus: Essays on Sociopolitical History, 1987
- Old Russian Feudal City, 1989
- Archaeology and Ancient History (In Defence of Historical Marxism), 2007
- Ukraine in an Orange Interior, 2012
- Early Rus: History and Archeology, 2013
- Ukraine in the Fire of European Integration, 2015
- The Origin of the Land of Rus', 2016
