= Nancy Shields Kollmann =

American historian (born 1950)

- Born: 1950 (age 75–76)

Academic background
- Education: Middlebury College (AB); Harvard University (AM, PhD)

Academic work
- Discipline: History
- Institutions: Stanford University
- Main interests: History of Russia

Nancy Shields Kollmann (born 1950), also known simply as Nancy Kollmann, is an American historian. Since 2004 she has been the William H. Bonsall Professor in History at Stanford University. She is known for her works on the history of Russia.

== Work ==
One of Kollmann's works, The Russian Empire 1450–1801, (2017) reveals how Imperial Russia’s regions were conquered and how this empire state was governed. She describes both the Tsardom of Russia and Russian Empire as characterized by a 'politics of difference': the rulers and affiliated elites defined the state’s needs minimally (asserting control over defense, taxes, mobilization of resources, and criminal laws) and otherwise tolerated regional religions, mores, languages, local elites and institutions. Imperial Russia's political core related to the Empire's communities and religions "vertically", giving each various rights and autonomies but disallowing “horizontal” connections across ethnic, linguistic, religious, confessional, or any other groups that could potentially identify and assert a common interest that could potentially threaten central state control.

=== Reception ===
Writing in journal Reviews in History, Tel Aviv University historian Orel Beilinson states that The Russian Empire, 1450–1801 offers a comprehensive and authoritative survey of early modern Russia, emphasizing continuity over change and highlighting the concept of "rule by difference" in the empire's expansion. Beilinson believes the book meticulously examines the geographical, political, social, and economic factors that contributed to Muscovy's rise and its transformation into an empire, drawing comparisons with other global powers. While its thematic structure may not be ideal for introductory courses, Beilinson deems this book an "invaluable" resource for advanced students and scholars of Russian history, offering a wealth of insights.

== Awards ==
- Frances Richardson Keller-Sierra Prize for "Crime and Punishment", Western Association for Women Historians (2013)

== Works ==
=== Books ===
- Kollmann, Nancy Shields (1987). Kinship and Politics: The Making of the Muscovite Political System, 1345–1547. Stanford, California: Stanford University Press. ISBN 978-0-8047-1340-5.
- Kollmann, Nancy Shields (1999). By Honor Bound: State and Society in Early Modern Russia. Ithaca, N.Y: Cornell University Press. ISBN 978-0-8014-3435-8.
  - Translated into Russian as Соединённые честью. Государство и общество в России раннего нового времени, Древлехранилище, 2001.
- Kollmann, Nancy Shields (2012). Crime and Punishment in Early Modern Russia, 1500–1725. New Studies in European History. Cambridge University Press. ISBN 978-1-1070-2513-4.
  - Translated into Russian as Преступление и наказание в России раннего Нового времени, Новое литературное обозрение, 2016.
- Kollmann, Nancy Shields (2017) [2016]. The Russian Empire 1450–1801. Oxford: Oxford University Press. ISBN 978-0-19-928051-3.
  - Translated into Russian as Россия и еë империя. 1450–1801, Academic Studies Press, 2022.

=== Co-authored works ===
- Kollmann, Nancy Shields (1995). "23. The principalities of Rus' in the fourteenth century". In Reuter, Timothy (ed.). The New Cambridge Medieval History: Volume 6, c.1300–c.1415. Cambridge: Cambridge University Press. pp. 764–794. ISBN 9780521362900.
- Samuel Baron and Nancy Shields Kollmann, eds., Religion and Culture in Early Modern Russia and Ukraine. DeKalb: Northern Illinois Press, 1997.
- Kollmann, Nancy Shields. "Society and Identity." In Modernizing Muscovy: Reform and Social Change in Seventeenth Century Russia, ed. Jarmo Kotilaine & Marshall Poe. (London: Routledge, 2004) pp. 417–431.

=== Journal articles (selection) ===
- Kollmann, Nancy Shields (1983). "The Seclusion of Elite Muscovite Women". Russian History. 2. 10: 172.
- Kollmann, Nancy Shields (1986). "Consensus Politics: The Dynastic Crisis of the 1490s Reconsidered". Russian Review. 45 (3): 235–267. doi:10.2307/130110. JSTOR 130110.
- Kollmann, Nancy Shields (1986). "Ritual and Social Drama at the Muscovite Court". Slavic Review. 45 (3): 486–502. doi:10.2307/2499053. ISSN 0037-6779. JSTOR 2499053.
- Kollmann, Nancy Shields (1990). "Collateral Succession in Kievan Rus'". Harvard Ukrainian Studies. 14: 377–387.
