= Daniel C. Waugh =

American historian

Daniel Clarke Waugh is a historian based at the University of Washington. He did his undergraduate work at Yale University, and in 1963 graduated with a B.A. in Physics. In 1965, he finished his Master's on the Regional Studies of the Soviet Union at Harvard University, and seven years later he completed his Ph.D. at the same institution. The same year, 1972, he began his employment at the University of Washington, and has remained there ever since. He taught in three different departments, namely the departments of History, International Studies, and Slavic and East European Languages and Literature until 2006. His main academic interests are Central Asia and medieval and early modern Russia, although he once focused on Ottoman history. He is the director of the Silk Road Seattle project and editor of the annual journal of the Silkroad Foundation.

== Publications ==
=== Books ===
- Slavianskie rukopisi Sobraniia grafa F. A. Tolstogo: Materialy k istorii sobraniia i ukazateli nyneshnikh i prezhnikh shifrov (The Slavic Manuscripts in the Collection of Count F. A. Tolstoi: Materials on the History of the Collection and Indexes to the Current and Former Code Numbers), (Zug, Switzerland: Inter Documentation Company, 1977; 2nd ed., Leningrad: Biblioteka Akademii nauk SSSR, 1980)
- The Great Turkes Defiance: On the History of the Apocryphal Correspondence of the Ottoman Sultan in Its Muscovite and Russian Variants, with a foreword by Academician Dmitrii Sergeevich Likhachev, (Columbus, Ohio: Slavica Publishers, 1978)
- (editor), Essays in Honor of A. A. Zimin, Columbus, O.: Slavica: 1985
- (co-editor with M. Holt Ruffin), Civil Society in Central Asia, (Seattle: University of Washington Press, 1999)
- (Contributor; co-editor), Vagabond Life: The Caucasus Writings of George Kennan. Ed. with Intr. and Afterword by Frith Maier, with contributions by Daniel C. Waugh (Seattle, University of Washington Press, 2003)
- Istoriia odnoi knigi: Viatka i "ne-sovremennost'" russkoi kul'tury v epokhu Petra Velikogo (The History of a Book: Viatka and the Non-Modernity of Russian Culture in the Age of Peter the Great), (St. Petersburg: Izdatel'stvo "Dmitrii Bulanin," 2003)
