= Donald Ostrowski =

American historian specialising in Kievan Rus' and Muscovy

Donald "Don" Gary Ostrowski (born 1945) is an American historian, and a lecturer in history at Harvard Extension School. He specialises in the political and social history of Kievan Rus' and Muscovy (early modern Russia).

== Biography ==
Ostrowski received his PhD in history from Pennsylvania State University in 1977. He is known for his work on textual criticism of the Primary Chronicle. The Povest’ vremennykh let: An Interlinear Collation and Paradosis (Harvard Ukrainian Research Institute, 2003) under his co-editorship received the Early Slavic Studies Association Award for Distinguished Scholarship. Together with scholars such as Oleksiy Tolochko and Ludolf Müller (1917–2009), Ostrowski is credited with having reignited interest in textual criticism of the Primary Chronicle around the year 2000. His work in advancing this field has been praised by many, though some parts of his methodology have been questioned by fellow scholars.

Ostrowski's other publications include Who Wrote That? Authorship Controversies from Moses to Sholokhov (2020) and two other monographs, and six co-edited collections of articles. Serhii Plokhy (2006) said that Ostrowski's monograph Muscovy and the Mongols (1998) 'successfully challenged the myth of the "Tatar yoke" and persuasively identified numerous borrowings of the Muscovite political elite and society from their Qipchaq overlords.' The evidence put forth had made it 'difficult to reject the argument of Russian Eurasianists and Western scholars like Keenan and Ostrowski that the early modern Russian state was much more a product of its recent Mongol experience than of the chronologically and geographically removed Kyivan past.' The book also re-dated all of the literary works of the Kulikovo cycle to after the 1440s, a significant conclusion for dating the translatio of the Rus' land from the Middle Dnieper to Suzdalia.

== Selected works ==
=== Co-edited works ===
- Ostrowski, Donald; Birnbaum, David J., eds. (2003). The Povest' vremennykh let: An Interlinear Collation and Paradosis. 3 volumes (in English and Church Slavic). Cambridge, MA: Harvard University Press. Archived from the original on 9 March 2005. (Harvard University Press, 2004).
  - Ostrowski, Donald; Birnbaum, David J. (7 December 2014). "Rus' primary chronicle critical edition – Interlinear line-level collation". pvl.obdurodon.org (in Church Slavic). Archived from the original on 28 April 2025.
- Ostrowski, Donald (14 September 2006). "The Growth of Muscovy (1462–1533)". In Perrie, Maureen (ed.). The Cambridge History of Russia. Cambridge University Press. pp. 211–239. doi:10.1017/chol9780521812276.010. ISBN 978-1-139-05410-2.
- Donald Ostrowski, "Redating the Life of Alexander Nevskii," in Rude and Barbarous Kingdom Revisited: Essays in Russian History in Honor of Robert O. Crummey, ed. Chester Dunning, Russell E. Martin, and Daniel Rowland (Bloomington: Slavica, 2008), 23–39.
- (co-editor with Marshall Poe) Portraits of Old Russia: Imagined Lives of Ordinary People, 1300–1725 (M.E. Sharpe, 2011).
- Ostrowski, Donald (2017). Portraits of Medieval Eastern Europe, 900–1400. Christian Raffensperger. Abingdon, Oxon. p. 10. ISBN 978-1-315-20417-8. OCLC 994543451.

=== Monographs ===
- Ostrowski, Donald (May 1977). A "fontological" Investigation of the Muscovite Church Council of 1503. Pennsylvania State University. p. 641. (PhD dissertation)
- Ostrowski, Donald (20 June 2002). Muscovy and the Mongols. Cambridge University Press. ISBN 0-521-89410-7.
- Ostrowski, Donald (15 June 2020). Who Wrote That?. Cornell University Press. doi:10.7591/cornell/9781501749704.001.0001. ISBN 978-1-5017-4970-4.
- Ostrowski, Donald (2022). Russia in the Early Modern World. Lexington Books. ISBN 978-1-7936-3420-7.
- Raffensperger, Christian; Ostrowski, Donald (13 July 2023). The Ruling Families of Rus. Reaktion Books. ISBN 978-1-78914-715-5.

=== Journal articles (chronological selection) ===
- “The Debate over the Authorship of the Rus’ Primary Chronicle: Compilations, Redactions, and Urtexts,” in Historioraphy and Identity, vol. 5: The Emergence of New Peoples and Polities in Europe 1000–1300, edited by Walter Pohl, Francescro Borri, and Veronika Wieser. Turnhout: Brepols, 2023, pp. 415–448.
- Ostrowski, Donald (2005). "Scribal Practices and Copying Probabilities in the Transmission of the Text of the Povest' vremennykh let" (PDF). Palaeoslavica. 13 (2): 48–77.
- “Second-Redaction Additions in Carpini’s Ystoria Mongalorum,” Adelphotes: A Tribute to Omeljan Pritsak by His Students, Cambridge, MA (=Harvard Ukrainian Studies, vol. 14, 1990) 1991, pp. 522–550.
- “The Mongols in the Eyes of the Rus’,” in The Mongol World, edited by Timothy May and Michael Hope. London: Routledge, 2022, pp. 826–841.
- "Church Polemics and Monastic Land Acquisition in Sixteenth-Century Muscov"y, Slavonic and East European Review, vol. 64, 1986, pp. 355–379 (reprinted in Major Problems in Early Modern Russian History, edited by Nancy Shields Kollmann, New York: Garland Publishing, 1992, pp. 129–153).
- "Unresolved Evidentiary Issues concerning Rus’ Heretics of the Late Fifteenth–Early Sixteenth Centuries", in Seeing Muscovy Anew: Politics—Institutions—Culture in Honor of Nancy Shields Kollmann, edited by Michael S. Flier, Valerie A. Kivelson, Erika Monahan, and Daniel Rowland. Bloomington, IN: Slavica Press, 2017, pp. 123–139.
- “Peter’s Dragoons: How the Russians Won at Poltava,” in Poltava 1709: The Battle and the Myth, edited by Serhii Plokhy. Cambridge, MA: Distributed by Harvard University Press for the Harvard Ukrainian Research Institute, 2012, pp. 81–106.
- “The Replacement of the Composite Reflex Bow by Firearms in the Muscovite Cavalry,” Kritika: Explorations in Russian and Eurasian History, vol. 11, no. 3 (Summer 2010), pp. 513–534; reprinted with illustrations in Everyday Life in Russian History: Quotidian Studies in Honor of Daniel Kaiser, edited by Gary Marker, Joan Neuberger, Marshall Poe, and Susan Rapp, Bloomington, IN: Slavica Publishers, 2010, pp. 203–227.
- “Alexander Nevskii’s ‘Battle on the Ice’: The Creation of a Legend.” Russian History/Histoire Russe, vol. 33 (2006), pp. 289–312.
- “The Return of the Rhos: Patria, Chacanus, and the Annales Bertiniani.” Canadian-American Slavic Studies, vol. 52, no. 2/3 (2018), pp. 290–311.
- “Was There a Riurikid Dynasty in Early Rus’?” Canadian-American Slavic Studies, vol. 52, no. 1 (2018), pp. 30–49.

=== Tribute ===
- Boeck, Brian J.; Martin, Russell E.; Rowland, Daniel, eds. (2012). Dubitando: Studies in History and Culture in Honor of Donald Ostrowski. Cambridge University Press. p. 504. ISBN 978-0-8-9357-404-8.

== Sources ==
- Gippius, Alexey A. (2014). "Reconstructing the original of the Povesť vremennyx let: a contribution to the debate". Russian Linguistics. 38 (3). Springer: 341–366. doi:10.1007/s11185-014-9137-y. JSTOR 43945126. S2CID 255017212.
- Halperin, Charles J. (2022). The Rise and Demise of the Myth of the Rus' Land (PDF). Leeds: Arc Humanities Press. p. 107. ISBN 9781802700565.
- Isoaho, Mari (2018). "Shakhmatov's Legacy and the Chronicles of Kievan Rus'". Kritika: Explorations in Russian and Eurasian History. 19 (3). Slavica Publishers: 637–648. doi:10.1353/kri.2018.0033. S2CID 159688925.
- Plokhy, Serhii (2006). The Origins of the Slavic Nations: Premodern Identities in Russia, Ukraine, and Belarus (PDF). New York: Cambridge University Press. pp. 10–15. ISBN 978-0-521-86403-9. Archived (PDF) from the original on 6 June 2011.
