= Kritika: Explorations in Russian and Eurasian History =

- Discipline: Russian history
- Language: English
- Edited by: Andrew Jenks, Susan Morrissey, Willard Sunderland

Publication details
- History: 2000-present
- Publisher: Slavica Publishers
- Frequency: Quarterly

Standard abbreviations
- ISO 4: Kritika

Indexing
- ISSN: 1531-023X (print); 1538-5000 (web)
- LCCN: 2002212208
- OCLC no.: 48818489

Links
- Journal homepage; Online access; Online archive; Journal page at publisher's website; Online access at Project MUSE

Kritika: Explorations in Russian and Eurasian History is a quarterly peer-reviewed academic journal published by Slavica Publishers. It covers the history and culture of Russia and Eurasia. The editors-in-chief are Andrew Jenks (California State University), Susan Morrissey (University of California, Irvine), and Willard Sunderland (University of Cincinnati). The journal was co-founded by Marshall Poe, editor of the New Books Network.

== Abstracting and indexing ==
The journal is abstracted and indexed in:

- Arts and Humanities Citation Index
- Current Contents/Arts and Humanities
- EBSCO databases
- Modern Language Association Database
- Scopus
