= Kievan Rus' =

c. 880–1240 East Slavic state in Europe

Coordinates: 50.450°N 30.525°E

- c. 880–1240
- Rurikid princely emblems depicted on coins: Left: Vladimir the Great (10–11th century); Right: Yaroslav the Wise (11th century)

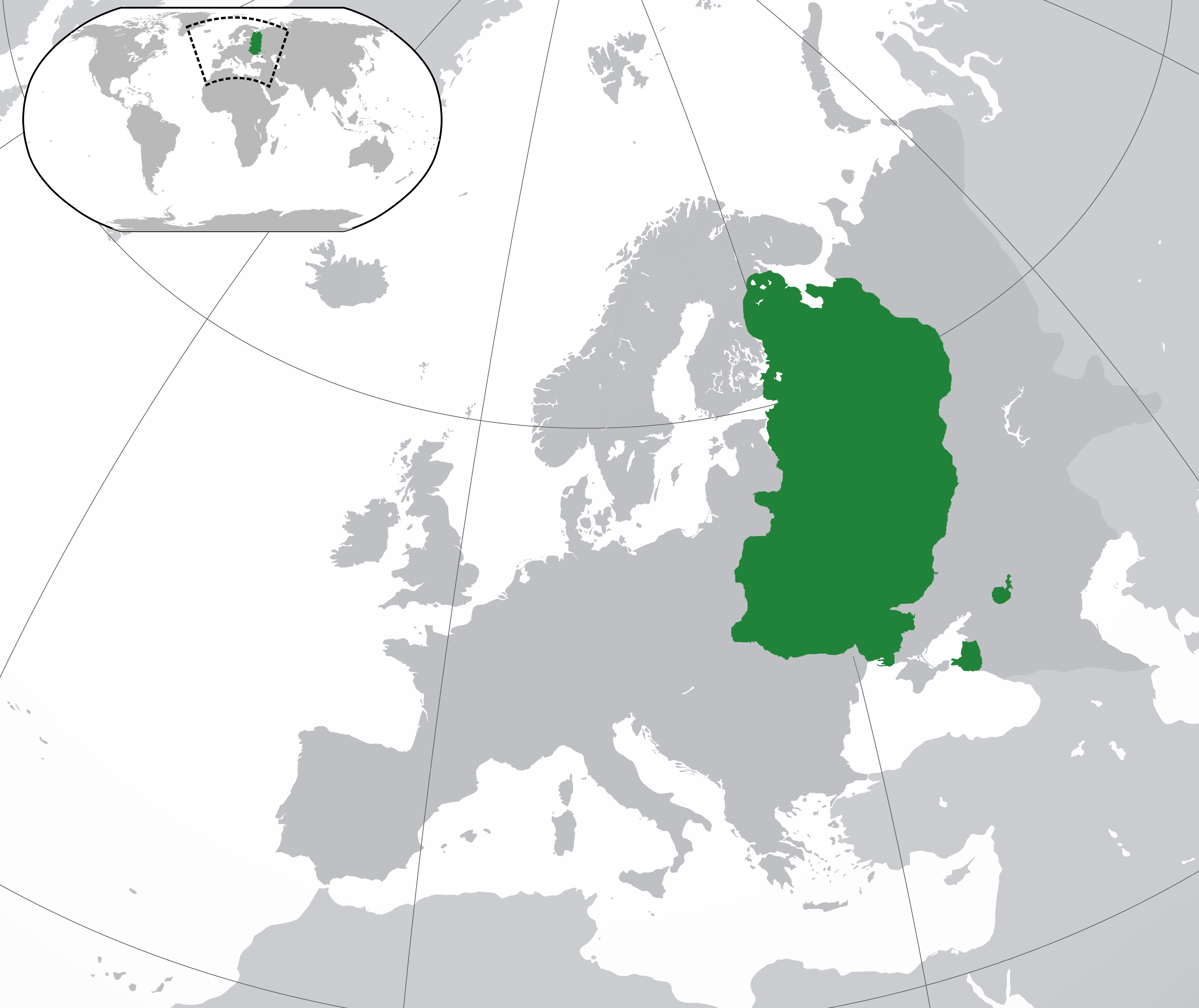
- A map of Kievan Rus' after the death of Yaroslav I in 1054
- Capital: Kiev (882–1240)
- Common languages: Old East Slavic; Old Church Slavonic (literary); Old Norse; Finnic languages
- Religion: Slavic paganism (native faith of Slavs); Reformed state paganism (official until 10th century); Orthodox Christianity (official since 10th cent.); Norse paganism (locally practiced); Finnish paganism (native faith of Finnic peoples)
- Demonym: Rus'
- Government: Monarchy
- Knyaz
  - c. 882–912 (first): Oleg the Wise
- Historical era: Middle Ages
  - Established: c. 880
  - Conquest of Khazar Khaganate: 965–969
  - Christianization: c. 988
  - Russkaya Pravda: 1050s
  - Mongol invasion: 1237–1241
  - Siege of Kiev: 1240

Area
- 1000: 1,330,000 km^{2} (510,000 sq mi)

Population
  - 1000: 5.4 million
- Currency: Grivna
Preceded by
Rus' Khaganate
Eastern Polans
Severians
Drevlians
Volhynians
Tivertsi
Ulichs
White Croats
Krivichs
Radimichs
Dregoviches
Ilmen Slavs
Vyatichi
Chud
Volga Finns
Succeeded by
Principality of Kiev
Principality of Chernigov
Principality of Pereyaslavl
Principality of Volhynia
Principality of Galicia
Principality of Polotsk
Principality of Smolensk
Novgorod Republic
Principality of Ryazan
Vladimir-Suzdal
Mongol Empire

Kievan Rus', (Note: Also commonly spelled Kievan Rus without the apostrophe) also known as Kyivan Rus', was the first East Slavic state and, later, an amalgam of principalities, in Eastern Europe from the late 9th to the mid-13th century. Encompassing a variety of polities and peoples, including East Slavic, Norse, and Finnic, it was ruled by the Rurik dynasty, founded by the Varangian prince Rurik. At its greatest extent in the mid-11th century, Kievan Rus' stretched from the White Sea in the north to the Black Sea in the south and from the Carpathian Mountains in the west to the Taman Peninsula in the east, uniting the East Slavic tribes.

According to the Primary Chronicle, the first ruler to unite East Slavic lands into what would become Kievan Rus' was Varangian prince Oleg the Wise (r. 879–912). He extended his control from Novgorod south along the Dnieper river valley to protect trade from Khazar incursions from the east, and took control of the city of Kiev, laying the foundation of the state and becoming prince of Kiev. Sviatoslav I (r. 943–972) achieved the first major territorial expansion of the state, fighting a war of conquest against the Khazars. Vladimir the Great (r. 980–1015) spread Christianity with his own baptism and, by decree, extended it to all inhabitants of Kiev and beyond. Kievan Rus' reached its greatest extent under Yaroslav the Wise (r. 1019–1054); his sons assembled and issued its first written legal code, the Russkaya Pravda, shortly after his death.

The state began to decline in the late 11th century, gradually disintegrating into various rival regional powers throughout the 12th century. It was further weakened by external factors, such as the decline of the Byzantine Empire, its major economic partner, and the accompanying diminution of trade routes through its territory. It finally fell to the Mongol invasion in the mid-13th century, though the Rurik dynasty would continue to rule until the death of Feodor I of Russia in 1598. The modern nations of Belarus, Russia, and Ukraine all claim Kievan Rus' as their cultural ancestor, (Note: 'For all the salient differences between these three post-Soviet nations, they have much in common when it comes to their culture and history, which goes back to Kievan Rus', the medieval East Slavic state based in the capital of present-day Ukraine,') with Belarus and Russia deriving their names from it.

== Names ==
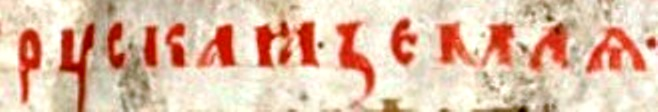
Rusĭskaja zemlja from the Primary Chronicle, a copy of the Laurentian Codex

During its existence, Kievan Rus' was known as rusĭskaja zemlja, translated as the "land of Rus'", or the "Rus' land" (Old East Slavic: роу́сьскаꙗ землꙗ́), with Rus' being derived from the ethnonym Роусь, Rusĭ (Medieval Greek: Ῥῶς, romanized: Rhos; Arabic: الروس, romanized: ar-Rūs), in Greek as Ῥωσία, Rhosia, in Old French as Russie, Rossie, in Latin as Rusia or Russia (with local German spelling variants Ruscia and Ruzzia), and from the 12th century also as Ruthenia or Rutenia. Various etymologies have been proposed, including Ruotsi, the Finnish designation for Sweden or Ros, a tribe from the middle Dnieper valley region.

According to the prevalent theory, the name Rus', like the Proto-Finnic name for Sweden (*rootsi), is derived from an Old Norse term for 'men who row' (rods-) because rowing was the main method of navigating the rivers of Eastern Europe, and could be linked to the Swedish coastal area of Roden, later known as Roslagen. The name Rus' would then have the same origin as the Finnish and Estonian names for Sweden: Ruotsi and Rootsi.

When the Varangian princes arrived, the name Rus' was associated with them and came to be associated with the territories they controlled. Initially the cities of Kiev, Chernigov, and Pereyaslavl and their surroundings came under Varangian control. From the late tenth century, Vladimir the Great and Yaroslav the Wise tried to associate the name with all of the extended princely domains. Both meanings persisted in sources until the Mongol conquest: the narrower one, referring to the triangular territory east of the middle Dnieper, and the broader one, encompassing all the lands under the hegemony of Kiev's grand princes.

While Polish historian Maciej Stryjkowski in 1582 coined the term Rusi Kijowskiey for the historical region around Kiev, it would be Mykhailo Maksymovych, an Imperial Russian historian from Left-Bank Ukraine, who in 1837 adapted it as Kiyevskaya Rus' (Russian: Ки́евская Русь) to describe the region where the medieval principality emerged, after which it expanded outward in all directions. (Note: "И так Новогородская земля обрусела позднее чем Северозападная или Белая Русь, чем Северовосточная или Суздальская Русь, чем Югозападная или Червоная Русь, кои в XII веке уже были Русью, — города коих были родными детьми Киеву, и по утрате коих первозванная Земля Русская прозвалася Украиною, а в XIV веке во Владимире-Волынском получила имя Малой Руси. Сия-то древняя Киевская Русь была рассадником Русского духа для храбрых сынов своих — Русичей, духа любви к Русском Земле и ее славе, которою звучали самые имена Русских Князей." ("And so the Novgorod Land became Rus' later than Northwestern or White Rus', later than Northeastern or Suzdalian Rus', and later than Southwestern or Red Rus', all of which were already part of Rus' in the 12th century, — cities which were the natural offspring of Kiev, and upon the loss of which the region originally called the Rus' Land came to be known as Ukraine, whilst in the 14th century, in Volodymyr-Volynskyi, it was given the name Little Rus'. It was this ancient Kievan Rus' that served as the cradle of the Rus' spirit for its valiant sons—the Rus' people—a spirit of love for the Rus' Land and its glory, which resounded in the very names of the Rus' princes.")) This term was subsequently used in 19th-century Russian historiography to refer to the period when Kiev served as the leading political centre. This term, alternatively spelled as Kievan Russia, is often used to refer to the period spanning from the 9th century to the mid-13th century. In English, the term was introduced to distinguish the early polity from successor states, which were also named Rus'. Another notable work which contributed to the establishment of the term among the English-speaking audience was George Vernadsky's 1948 work Kievan Russia.

During the Soviet period, after 1934 the term "Kievan Rus'" was introduced as the standard name of the medieval polity in government-published schoolbooks. The term was additionally popularized by historical works of Boris Grekov. The name "Kievan Rus'" was also present in an official publication by the Central Committee of the Communist Party of the Soviet Union dedicated to the 300th anniversary of Pereyaslav Council in 1954. In modern Ukraine the term has been gradually eliminated from educational literature in favour of the original term Rus' or Rus'-Ukraine.

A alternative name of Rus' used by Varangians was the Old Norse toponym Garðaríki, which, according to a common interpretation, means "land of towns". The territories of Staraya Ladoga and Rurikovo Gorodische were initially called Garðar, before Garðaríki was used as a denomination for the entire state after the Varangians moved to the Middle Dnieper.

== History ==
=== Origin ===
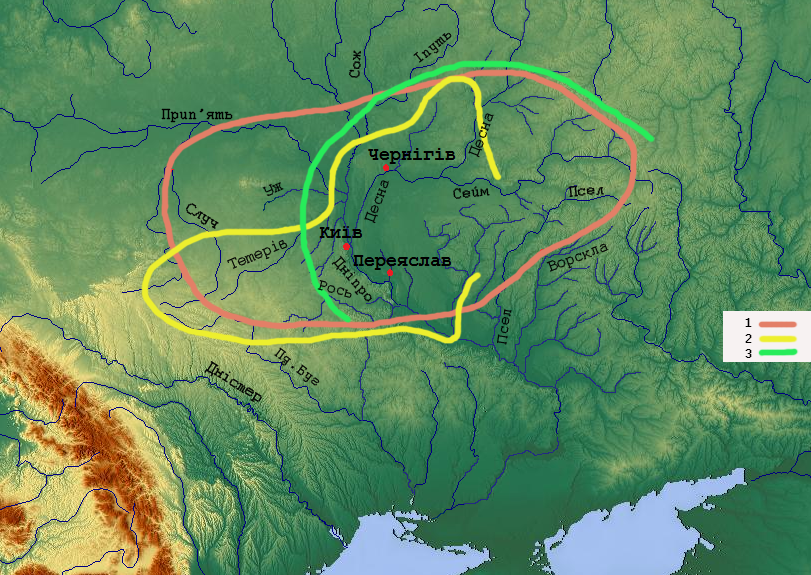
Rus' land in the narrow sense.: 1. After Petro Tolochko; 2. After A. M. Nasonov; 3. After Boris Rybakov

Prior to the emergence of Kievan Rus' in the 9th century, most of the area north of the Black Sea was primarily populated by eastern Slavic tribes. In the northern region around Novgorod were the Ilmen Slavs and neighboring Krivichi, who occupied territories surrounding the headwaters of the West Dvina, Dnieper and Volga rivers. To their north, in the Ladoga and Karelia regions, were the Chud: various Baltic Finnic peoples. In the south, in the area around Kiev, were the Poliane, the Drevliane to the west of the Dnieper, and the Severiane to the east. To their north and east were the Vyatichi, and to their south was forested land settled by Slav farmers, giving way to steppelands populated by nomadic herdsmen. Some of the East Slavic tribes belonged to the Luka-Raikovetska culture, while others to the Volyntsevo culture.

There was once controversy over whether the Rus' were Varangians or Slavs (see anti-Normanism); however, more recently, scholarly attention has focused more on debating how quickly an ancestrally Norse people assimilated into Slavic culture. (Note: "The controversies over the nature of the Rus and the origins of the Russian state have bedevilled Viking studies, and indeed Russian history, for well over a century. It is historically certain that the Rus were Swedes. The evidence is incontrovertible, and that a debate still lingers at some levels of historical writing is clear evidence of the holding power of received notions. The debate over this issue – futile, embittered, tendentious, and doctrinaire – served to obscure the most serious and genuine historical problem which remains: the assimilation of these Viking Rus into the Slavic people among whom they lived. The principal historical question is not whether the Rus were Scandinavians or Slavs, but, rather, how quickly these Scandinavian Rus became absorbed into Slavic life and culture.") This uncertainty is due largely to a paucity of contemporary sources. Attempts to address this question instead rely on archaeological evidence, the accounts of foreign observers, and legends and literature from centuries later. To some extent the controversy is related to the foundation myths of modern states in the region. This often unfruitful debate over origins has periodically devolved into competing nationalist narratives of dubious scholarly value being promoted directly by various government bodies in a number of states. This was seen in the Stalinist period, when Soviet historiography sought to distance the Rus' from any connection to Germanic tribes, in an effort to dispel Nazi propaganda claiming the Russian state owed its existence and origins to the supposedly racially superior Norse tribes. More recently, in the context of resurgent nationalism in post-Soviet states, Anglophone scholarship has analyzed renewed efforts to use this debate to create ethno-nationalist foundation stories, with governments sometimes directly involved in the project. Conferences and publications questioning the Norse origins of the Rus' have been supported directly by state policy in some cases, and the resultant foundation myths have been included in some school textbooks in Russia.

While Varangians were Norse traders and Vikings, many Russian and Ukrainian nationalist historians argue that the Rus' were themselves Slavs. Normanist theories focus on the earliest written source for the East Slavs, the Primary Chronicle, which was produced in the 12th century. Nationalist accounts on the other hand have suggested that the Rus' were present before the arrival of the Varangians, noting that only a handful of Scandinavian words can be found in Russian and that Scandinavian names in the early chronicles were soon replaced by Slavic names.

Nevertheless, the close connection between the Rus' and the Norse is confirmed both by extensive Scandinavian settlement in Belarus, Russia, and Ukraine and by Slavic influences in the Swedish language. Though the debate over the origin of the Rus' remains politically charged, there is broad agreement that if the proto-Rus' were indeed originally Norse, they were quickly nativized, adopting Slavic languages and other cultural practices. This position, roughly representing a scholarly consensus (at least outside nationalist historiography), was summarized by the historian, F. Donald Logan, "in 839, the Rus were Swedes; in 1043 the Rus were Slavs".

Ahmad ibn Fadlan, an Arab traveler during the 10th century, provided one of the earliest written descriptions of the Rus': "They are as tall as a date palm, blond and ruddy, so that they do not need to wear a tunic nor a cloak; rather the men among them wear garments that only cover half of his body and leaves one of his hands free." Liutprand of Cremona, who was twice an envoy to the Byzantine court (949 and 968), identifies the "Russi" with the Norse ("the Russi, whom we call Norsemen by another name") but explains the name as a Greek term referring to their physical traits ("A certain people made up of a part of the Norse, whom the Greeks call [...] the Russi on account of their physical features, we designate as Norsemen because of the location of their origin."). Leo the Deacon, a 10th-century Byzantine historian and chronicler, refers to the Rus' as "Scythians" and notes that they tended to adopt Greek rituals and customs.

=== Calling of the Varangians ===
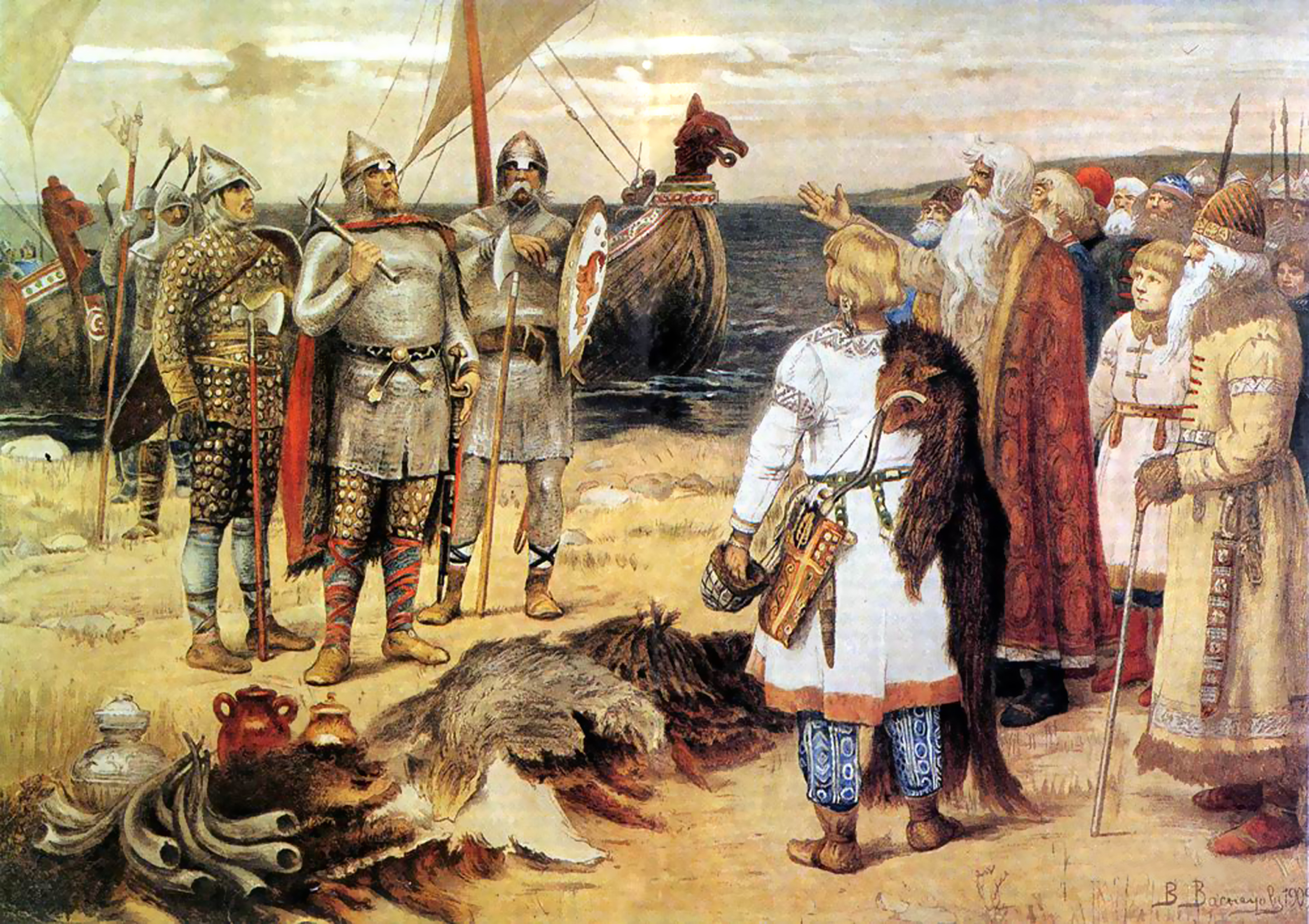
The Invitation of the Varangians by Viktor Vasnetsov: Rurik and his brothers Sineus and Truvor arrive at the lands of the Ilmen Slavs.

According to the Primary Chronicle, the territories of the East Slavs in the 9th century were divided between the Varangians and the Khazars. The Varangians are first mentioned imposing tribute on the northern tribes in 859. In 862, various tribes rebelled against the Varangians, driving them "back beyond the sea and, refusing them further tribute, set out to govern themselves".

They said to themselves, "Let us seek a prince who may rule over us, and judge us according to the Law." They accordingly went overseas to the Varangian Rus'. ... The Chuds, the Slavs, the Krivichs and the Ves then said to the Rus', "Our land is great and rich, but there is no order in it. Come to rule and reign over us". They thus selected three brothers with their kinfolk, who took with them all the Rus' and migrated.

Modern scholars find this an unlikely series of events, probably made up by the 12th-century Orthodox priests who authored the Chronicle as an explanation how the Vikings managed to conquer the lands along the Varangian route so easily, as well as to support the legitimacy of the Rurikid dynasty. The three brothers—Rurik, Sineus and Truvor—supposedly established themselves in Novgorod, Beloozero and Izborsk, respectively. Two of the brothers died, and Rurik became the sole ruler of the territory and progenitor of the Rurik dynasty. A short time later, two of Rurik's men, Askold and Dir, asked him for permission to go to Tsargrad (Constantinople). On their way south, they came upon "a small city on a hill", Kiev, which was a tributary of the Khazars at the time, stayed there and "established their dominion over the country of the Polyanians."

The Primary Chronicle reports that Askold and Dir continued to Constantinople with a navy to attack the city in 866, catching the Byzantines by surprise and ravaging the surrounding area, though other accounts date the attack in 860. Patriarch Photius vividly describes the "universal" devastation of the suburbs and nearby islands, and another account further details the destruction and slaughter of the invasion. The Rus' turned back before attacking the city itself, due either to a storm dispersing their boats, the return of the Emperor, or in a later account, due to a miracle after a ceremonial appeal by the Patriarch and the Emperor to the Virgin. The attack was the first encounter between the Rus' and Byzantines and led the Patriarch to send missionaries north to engage and attempt to convert the Rus' and the Slavs.

=== Foundation of the Kievan state ===
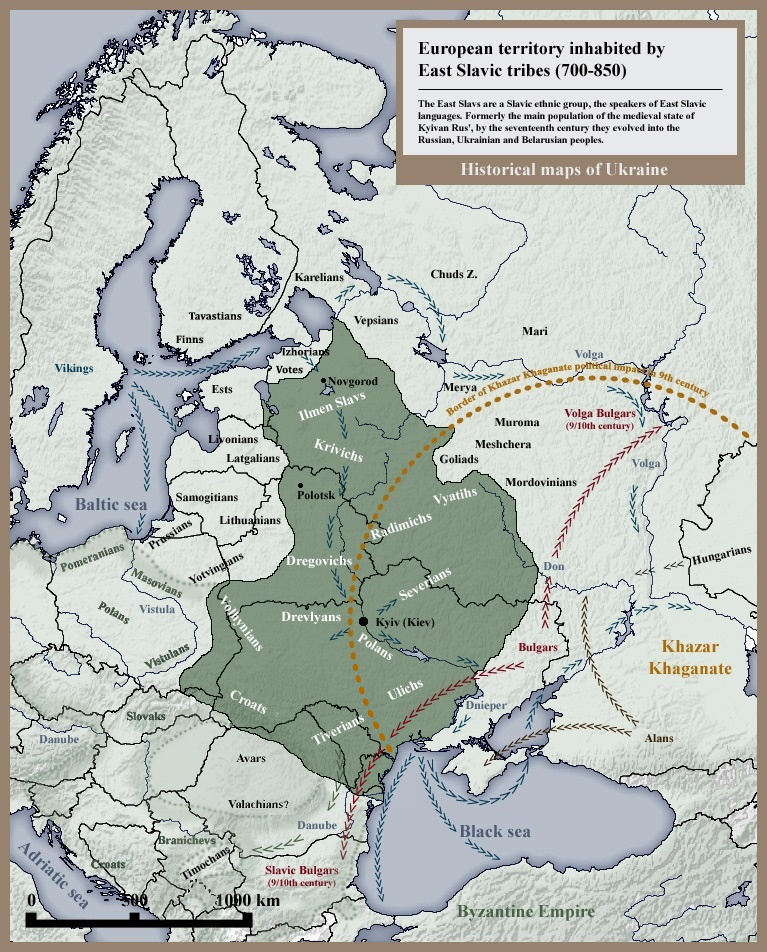
East-Slavic tribes and peoples, 8th–9th centuries

According to the Primary Chronicle, Rurik led the Rus' until his death around 879, bequeathing his kingdom to his kinsman, Oleg, as regent for his young son, Igor. It then says that Oleg captured Smolensk and later Kiev in 882. He killed Askold and Dir and made Kiev the new capital. (Note: Normanist scholars accept this moment as the foundation of the Kievan Rus' state, while anti-Normanists point to other Chronicle entries to argue that the East Slav Polianes were already in the process of forming a state independently.) Oleg set about consolidating his power over the surrounding region and the riverways north to Novgorod, imposing tribute on the East Slav tribes. Although the Primary Chronicle states that Oleg transferred his capital to Kiev, this account differs from what most Latin and Greek sources report for the next century, in which Kiev is still presented as only an outpost for Novgorod/Gorodische.

In 883, he conquered the Drevlians, imposing a fur tribute on them. By 885 he had subjugated the Poliane, Severiane, Vyatichi, and Radimichs, forbidding them to pay further tribute to the Khazars. Oleg continued to develop and expand a network of Rus' forts in Slavic lands, begun by Rurik in the north.

The new Kievan state prospered due to its abundant supply of furs, beeswax, honey and slaves for export, and because it controlled three main trade routes of Eastern Europe. In the north, Novgorod served as a commercial link between the Baltic Sea and the Volga trade route to the lands of the Volga Bulgars, the Khazars, and across the Caspian Sea as far as Baghdad, providing access to markets and products from Central Asia and the Middle East. Trade from the Baltic also moved south on a network of rivers and short portages along the Dnieper known as the "route from the Varangians to the Greeks," continuing to the Black Sea and on to Constantinople.

Kiev was a central outpost along the Dnieper route and a hub with the east–west overland trade route between the Khazars and the Germanic lands of Central Europe. and may have been a staging post for Radhanite Jewish traders between Western Europe, Itil and China. These commercial connections enriched Rus' merchants and princes, funding military forces and the construction of churches, palaces, fortifications, and further towns. Demand for luxury goods fostered the production of expensive jewelry and religious wares, allowing their export, and an advanced credit and money-lending system may have also been in place.

=== Early foreign relations ===
==== Volatile steppe politics ====
The rapid expansion of the Rus' to the south led to conflict and volatile relationships with the Khazars and other neighbors on the Pontic steppe. The Khazars dominated trade from the Volga-Don steppes to eastern Crimea and the northern Caucasus during the 8th century, an era historians call the 'Pax Khazarica', trading and frequently allying with the Byzantine Empire against Persians and Arabs. In the late 8th century, the collapse of the Göktürk Khaganate led the Magyars and the Pechenegs to migrate west from Central Asia into the steppe region, leading to military conflict, disruption of trade, and instability within the Khazar Khaganate. The Rus' and Slavs had earlier allied with the Khazars against Arab raids on the Caucasus, but they increasingly worked against them to secure control of the trade routes.

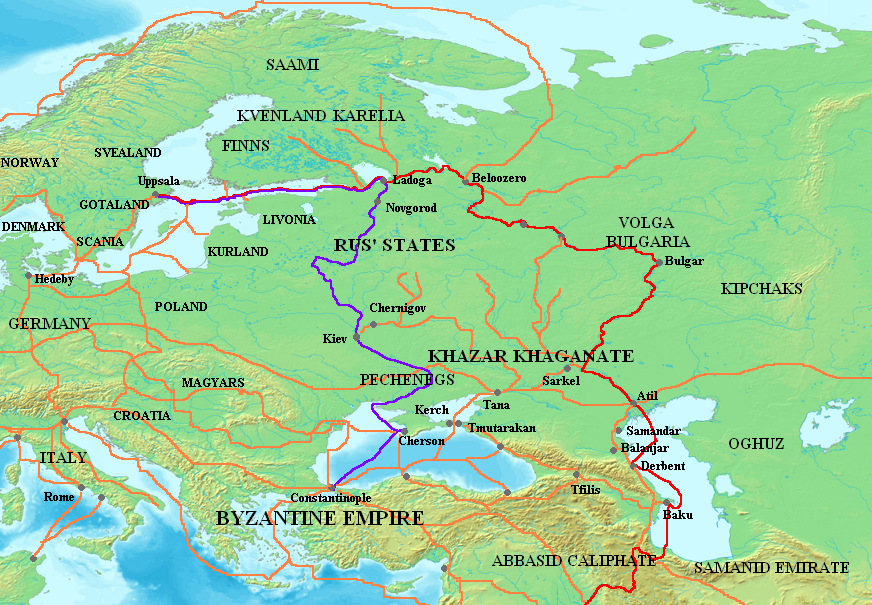
The Volga trade route (red), the "route from the Varangians to the Greeks" (purple) and other trade routes of the 8th–11th centuries (orange)

The Byzantine Empire was able to take advantage of the turmoil to expand its political influence and commercial relationships, first with the Khazars and later with the Rus' and other steppe groups. The Byzantines established the Theme of Cherson, formally known as Klimata, in the Crimea in the 830s to defend against raids by the Rus' and to protect vital grain shipments supplying Constantinople. Cherson also served as a key diplomatic link with the Khazars and others on the steppe, and it became the centre of Black Sea commerce. The Byzantines also helped the Khazars build a fortress at Sarkel on the Don river to protect their northwest frontier against incursions by the Turkic migrants and the Rus', and to control caravan trade routes and the portage between the Don and Volga rivers.

The expansion of the Rus' put further military and economic pressure on the Khazars, depriving them of territory, tributaries and trade. In around 890, Oleg waged an indecisive war in the lands of the lower Dniester and Dnieper rivers with the Tivertsi and the Ulichs, who were likely acting as vassals of the Magyars, blocking Rus' access to the Black Sea. In 894, the Magyars and Pechenegs were drawn into the wars between the Byzantines and the Bulgarian Empire. The Byzantines arranged for the Magyars to attack Bulgarian territory from the north, and Bulgaria in turn persuaded the Pechenegs to attack the Magyars from their rear.

Boxed in, the Magyars were forced to migrate further west across the Carpathian Mountains into the Hungarian plain, depriving the Khazars of an important ally and a buffer from the Rus'. The migration of the Magyars allowed access for the Rus' to the Black Sea, and they soon launched excursions into Khazar territory along the sea coast, up the Don river, and into the lower Volga region. The Rus' were raiding and plundering into the Caspian Sea region from 864, (Note: Abaskun, first recorded by Ptolemy as Socanaa, was documented in Arab sources as "the most famous port of the Khazarian Sea". It was situated within three days' journey from Gorgan. The southern part of the Caspian Sea was known as the "Sea of Abaskun".) with the first large-scale expedition in 913, when they extensively raided Baku, Gilan, Mazandaran and penetrated into the Caucasus. (Note: The Khazar khagan initially granted the Rus' safe passage in exchange for a share of the booty but attacked them on their return voyage, killing most of the raiders and seizing their haul.)

As the 10th century progressed, the Khazars were no longer able to command tribute from the Volga Bulgars, and their relationship with the Byzantines deteriorated, as Byzantium increasingly allied with the Pechenegs against them. The Pechenegs were thus secure to raid the lands of the Khazars from their base between the Volga and Don rivers, allowing them to expand to the west. Relations between the Rus' and Pechenegs were complex, as the groups alternately formed alliances with and against one another. The Pechenegs were nomads roaming the steppe raising livestock which they traded with the Rus' for agricultural goods and other products.

The lucrative Rus' trade with the Byzantine Empire had to pass through Pecheneg-controlled territory, so the need for generally peaceful relations was essential. Nevertheless, while the Primary Chronicle reports the Pechenegs entering Rus' territory in 915 and then making peace, they were waging war with one another again in 920. Pechenegs are reported assisting the Rus' in later campaigns against the Byzantines, yet allied with the Byzantines against the Rus' at other times.

==== Rus'–Byzantine relations ====
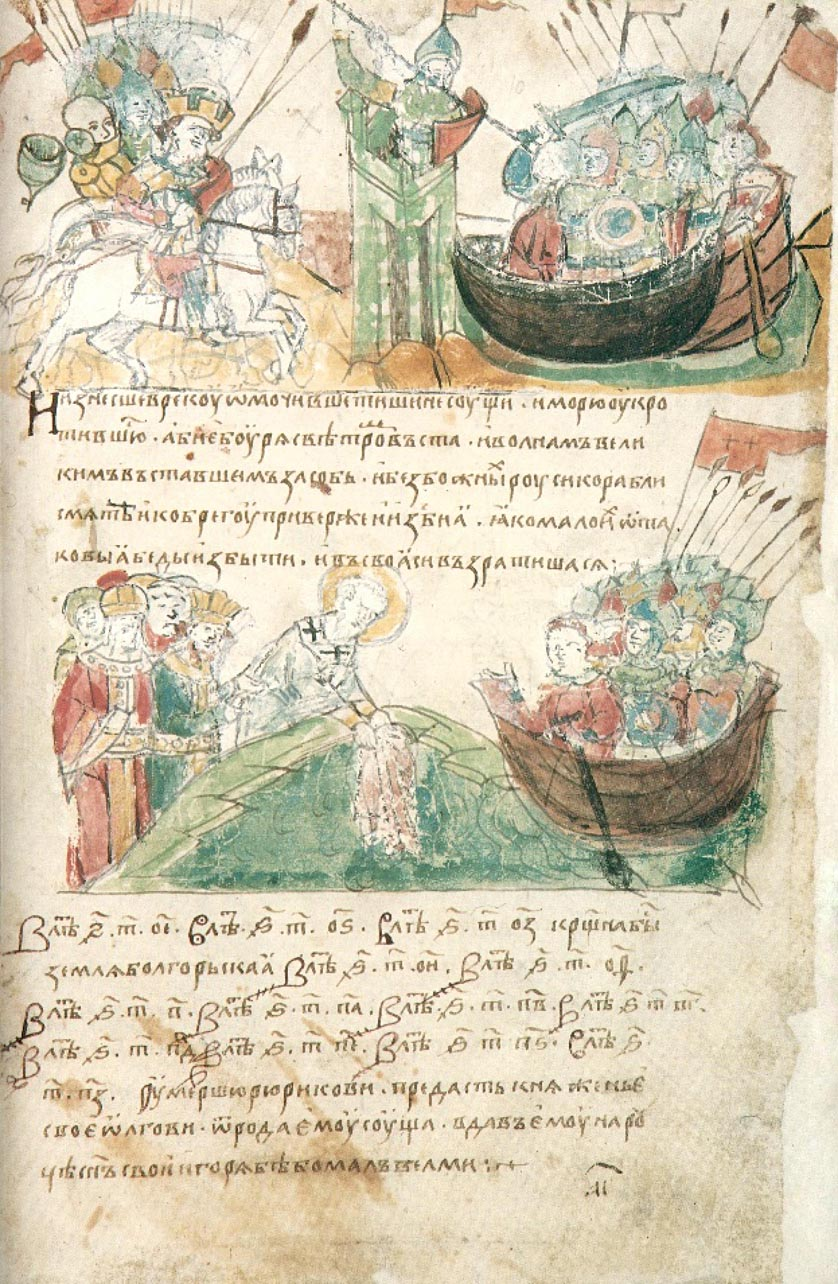
Rus' under the walls of Constantinople (860), the Radziwiłł Chronicle

After the Rus' attack on Constantinople in 860, the Byzantine Patriarch Photius sent missionaries north to convert the Rus' and the Slavs to Christianity. Prince Rastislav of Moravia had requested the Emperor to provide teachers to interpret the holy scriptures, so in 863 the brothers Cyril and Methodius were sent as missionaries, due to their knowledge of the Slavonic language. The Slavs had no written language, so the brothers devised the Glagolitic alphabet, later replaced by Cyrillic (developed in the First Bulgarian Empire) and standardized the language of the Slavs, later known as Old Church Slavonic. They translated portions of the Bible and drafted the first Slavic civil code and other documents, and the language and texts spread throughout Slavic territories, including Kievan Rus'. The mission of Cyril and Methodius served both evangelical and diplomatic purposes, spreading Byzantine cultural influence in support of imperial foreign policy. In 867 the Patriarch announced that the Rus' had accepted a bishop, and in 874 he speaks of an "Archbishop of the Rus'."

Relations between the Rus' and Byzantines became more complex after Oleg took control over Kiev, reflecting commercial, cultural, and military concerns. The wealth and income of the Rus' depended heavily upon trade with Byzantium. Constantine Porphyrogenitus described the annual course of the princes of Kiev, collecting tribute from client tribes, assembling the product into a flotilla of hundreds of boats, conducting them down the Dnieper to the Black Sea, and sailing to the estuary of the Dniester, the Danube delta, and on to Constantinople. On their return trip they would carry silk fabrics, spices, wine, and fruit.

The importance of this trade relationship led to military action when disputes arose. The Primary Chronicle reports that the Rus' attacked Constantinople again in 907, probably to secure trade access. The Chronicle glorifies the military prowess and shrewdness of Oleg, an account imbued with legendary detail. Byzantine sources do not mention the attack, but a pair of treaties in 907 and 911 set forth a trade agreement with the Rus', the terms suggesting pressure on the Byzantines, who granted the Rus' quarters and supplies for their merchants and tax-free trading privileges in Constantinople.

The Chronicle provides a mythic tale of Oleg's death. A sorcerer prophesies that the death of the prince would be associated with a certain horse. Oleg has the horse sequestered, and it later dies. Oleg goes to visit the horse and stands over the carcass, gloating that he had outlived the threat, when a snake strikes him from among the bones, and he soon becomes ill and dies. The Chronicle reports that Prince Igor succeeded Oleg in 913, and after some brief conflicts with the Drevlians and the Pechenegs, a period of peace ensued for over twenty years.

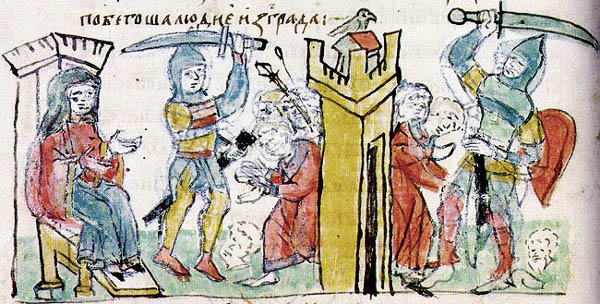
Princess Olga's avenge to the Drevlians, Radziwiłł Chronicle

In 941, Igor led another major Rus' attack on Constantinople, probably over trading rights again. A navy of 10,000 vessels, including Pecheneg allies, landed on the Bithynian coast and devastated the Asiatic shore of the Bosphorus. The attack was well timed, perhaps due to intelligence, as the Byzantine fleet was occupied with the Arabs in the Mediterranean, and the bulk of its army was stationed in the east. The Rus' burned towns, churches and monasteries, butchering the people and amassing booty. The emperor arranged for a small group of retired ships to be outfitted with Greek fire throwers and sent them out to meet the Rus', luring them into surrounding the contingent before unleashing the Greek fire.

Liutprand of Cremona wrote that "the Rus', seeing the flames, jumped overboard, preferring water to fire. Some sank, weighed down by the weight of their breastplates and helmets; others caught fire." Those captured were beheaded. The ploy dispelled the Rus' fleet, but their attacks continued into the hinterland as far as Nicomedia, with many atrocities reported as victims were crucified and set up for use as targets. At last a Byzantine army arrived from the Balkans to drive the Rus' back, and a naval contingent reportedly destroyed much of the Rus' fleet on its return voyage (possibly an exaggeration since the Rus' soon mounted another attack). The outcome indicates increased military might by Byzantium since 911, suggesting a shift in the balance of power.

Igor returned to Kiev keen for revenge. He assembled a large force of warriors from among neighboring Slavs and Pecheneg allies, and sent for reinforcements of Varangians from "beyond the sea". In 944, the Rus' force advanced again on the Greeks, by land and sea, and a Byzantine force from Cherson responded. The Emperor sent gifts and offered tribute in lieu of war, and the Rus' accepted. Envoys were sent between the Rus', the Byzantines, and the Bulgarians in 945, and a peace treaty was completed. The agreement again focused on trade, but this time with terms less favorable to the Rus', including stringent regulations on the conduct of Rus' merchants in Cherson and Constantinople and specific punishments for violations of the law. The Byzantines may have been motivated to enter the treaty out of concern of a prolonged alliance of the Rus', Pechenegs, and Bulgarians against them, though the more favorable terms further suggest a shift in power.

==== Sviatoslav ====
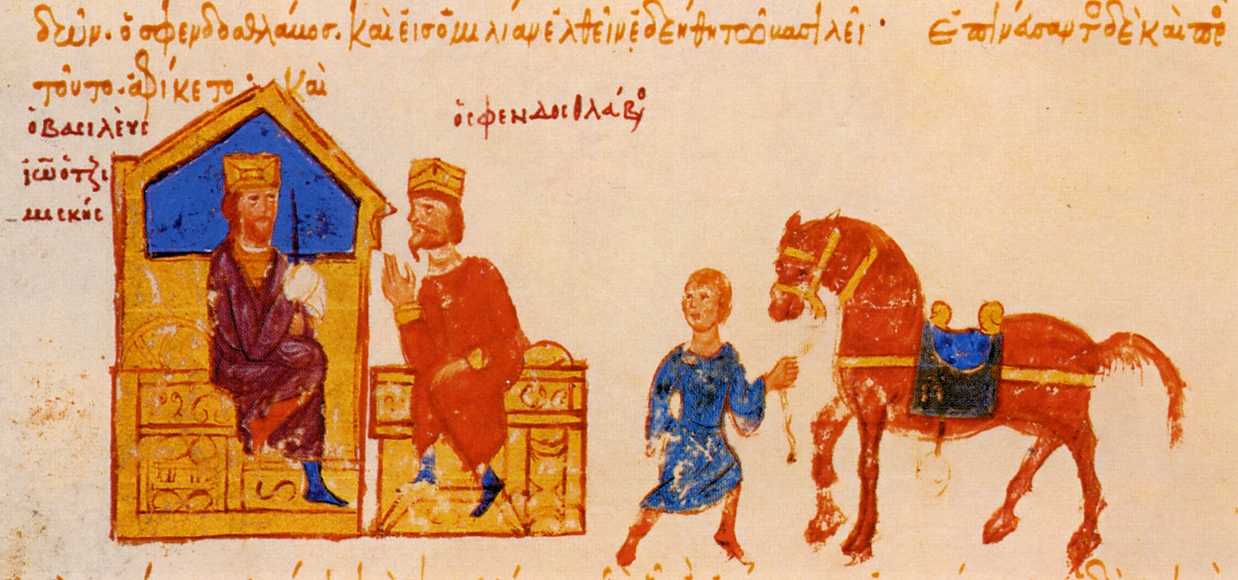
Madrid Skylitzes, meeting between John Tzimiskes and Sviatoslav

Following the death of Igor in 945, his wife Olga ruled as regent in Kiev until their son Sviatoslav reached maturity (c. 963). (Note: If Olga was indeed born in 879, as the Primary Chronicle seems to imply, she would have been about 65 at the time of Sviatoslav's birth. There are clearly some problems with chronology.) His decade-long reign over Kievan Rus' was marked by rapid expansion through the conquest of the Khazars of the Pontic steppe and the invasion of the Balkans. By the end of his short life, Sviatoslav carved out for himself the largest state in Europe, eventually moving his capital from Kiev to Pereyaslavets on the Danube in 969.

In contrast with his mother's conversion to Christianity, Sviatoslav, like his druzhina, remained a staunch pagan. Due to his abrupt death in an ambush in 972, Sviatoslav's conquests, for the most part, were not consolidated into a functioning empire, while his failure to establish a stable succession led to a fratricidal feud among his sons, which resulted in two of his three sons being killed.

=== Reign of Vladimir and Christianisation ===
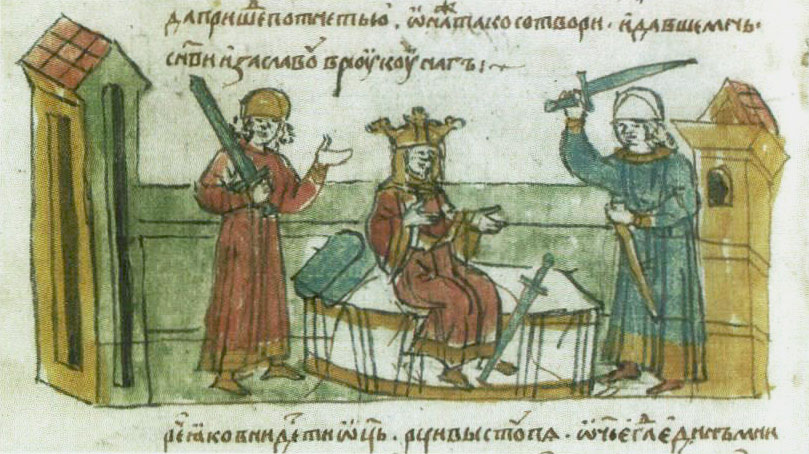
Rogneda of Polotsk, Vladimir I of Kiev and Izyaslav of Polotsk

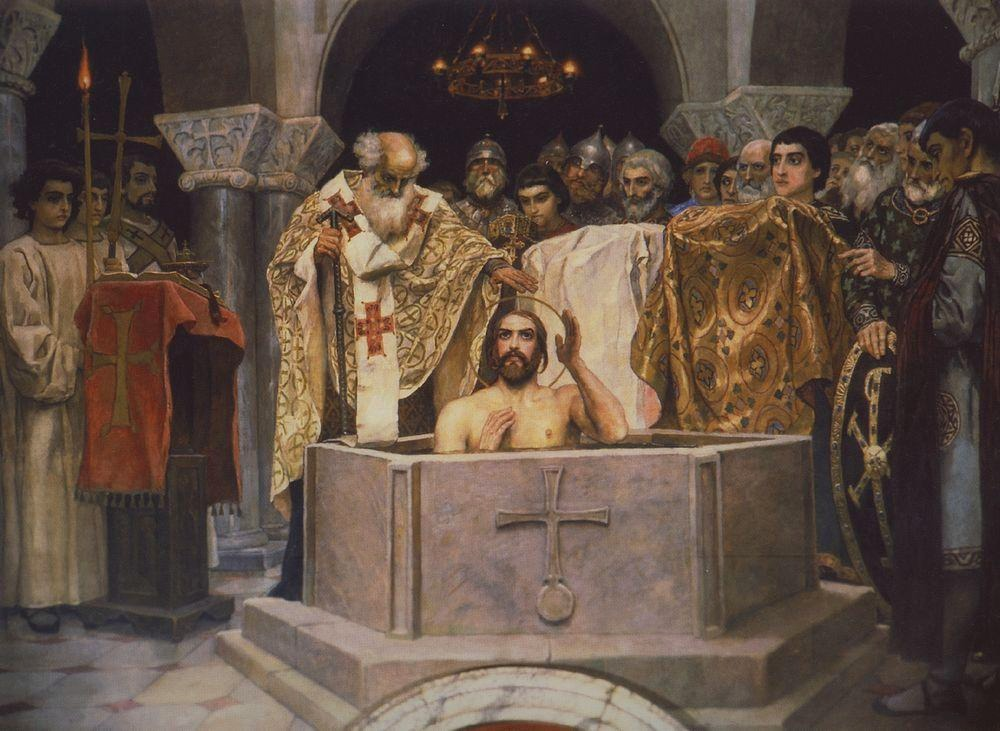
Baptism of Saint Prince Vladimir, by Viktor Vasnetsov, in St Volodymyr's Cathedral

It is not clearly documented when the title of grand prince was first introduced, but the importance of the Kiev principality was recognized after the death of Sviatoslav I in 972 and the ensuing struggle between Vladimir and Yaropolk. The region of Kiev dominated the region for the next two centuries. The grand prince (or grand duke) of Kiev controlled the lands around the city, and his formally subordinate relatives ruled the other cities and paid him tribute. The zenith of the state's power came during the reigns of Vladimir the Great (r. 980–1015) and Prince Yaroslav I the Wise (r. 1019–1054). Both rulers continued the steady expansion of Kievan Rus' that had begun under Oleg.

Vladimir had been prince of Novgorod when his father Sviatoslav I died in 972, but fled to Scandinavia in 977 after his half-brother Yaropolk killed his other half-brother Oleg. According to the Primary Chronicle, Vladimir assembled a host of Varangian warriors, first subdued the Principality of Polotsk and then defeated and killed Yaropolk, thus establishing his reign over the entire Kievan Rus' realm.

Although sometimes solely attributed to Vladimir, the Christianization of Kievan Rus' was a long and complicated process that began before the state's formation. As early as the 1st century AD, Greeks in the Black Sea Colonies converted to Christianity, and the Primary Chronicle even records the legend of Andrew the Apostle's mission to these coastal settlements, as well as blessing the site of present-day Kyiv. The Goths migrated to through the region in the 3rd century, adopting Arian Christianity in the 4th century, leaving behind 4th- and 5th-century churches excavated in Crimea, although the Hunnic invasion of the 370s halted Christianisation for several centuries. Some of the earliest Kievan princes and princesses such as Askold and Dir and Olga of Kiev reportedly converted to Christianity, but Oleg, Igor and Sviatoslav remained pagans.

The Primary Chronicle records the legend that when Vladimir had decided to accept a new faith instead of traditional Slavic paganism, he sent out some of his most valued advisors and warriors as emissaries to different parts of Europe. They visited the Christians of the Latin Church, the Jews, and the Muslims before finally arriving in Constantinople. They rejected Islam because, among other things, it prohibited the consumption of alcohol, and Judaism because the god of the Jews had permitted his chosen people to be deprived of their country. They found the ceremonies in the Roman church to be dull. But at Constantinople, they were so astounded by the beauty of the cathedral of Hagia Sophia and the liturgical service held there that they made up their minds there and then about the faith they would like to follow. Upon their arrival home, they convinced Vladimir that the faith of the Byzantine Rite was the best choice of all, upon which Vladimir made a journey to Constantinople and arranged to marry Princess Anna, the sister of Byzantine emperor Basil II. Historically, it is more likely that he adopted Byzantine Christianity in order to strengthen his diplomatic relations with Constantinople. Vladimir's choice of Eastern Christianity may have reflected his close personal ties with Constantinople, which dominated the Black Sea and hence trade on Kiev's most vital commercial route, the Dnieper River. According to the Primary Chronicle, Vladimir was baptised in c. 987, and ordered the population of Kiev to be baptised in August 988. The greatest resistance against Christianisation appears to have occurred in northern towns including Novgorod, Suzdal, and Belozersk.

Adherence to the Eastern Church had long-range political, cultural, and religious consequences. The church had a liturgy written in Cyrillic and a corpus of translations from Greek that had been produced for the Slavic peoples. This literature facilitated the conversion to Christianity of the Eastern Slavs and introduced them to rudimentary Greek philosophy, science, and historiography without the necessity of learning Greek (there were some merchants who did business with Greeks and likely had an understanding of contemporary business Greek). Following the Great Schism of 1054, the Kievan church maintained communion with both Rome and Constantinople for some time, but along with most of the Eastern churches it eventually split to follow the Eastern Orthodox. That being said, unlike other parts of the Greek world, Kievan Rus' did not have a strong hostility to the Western world.

=== Reign of Yaroslav ===
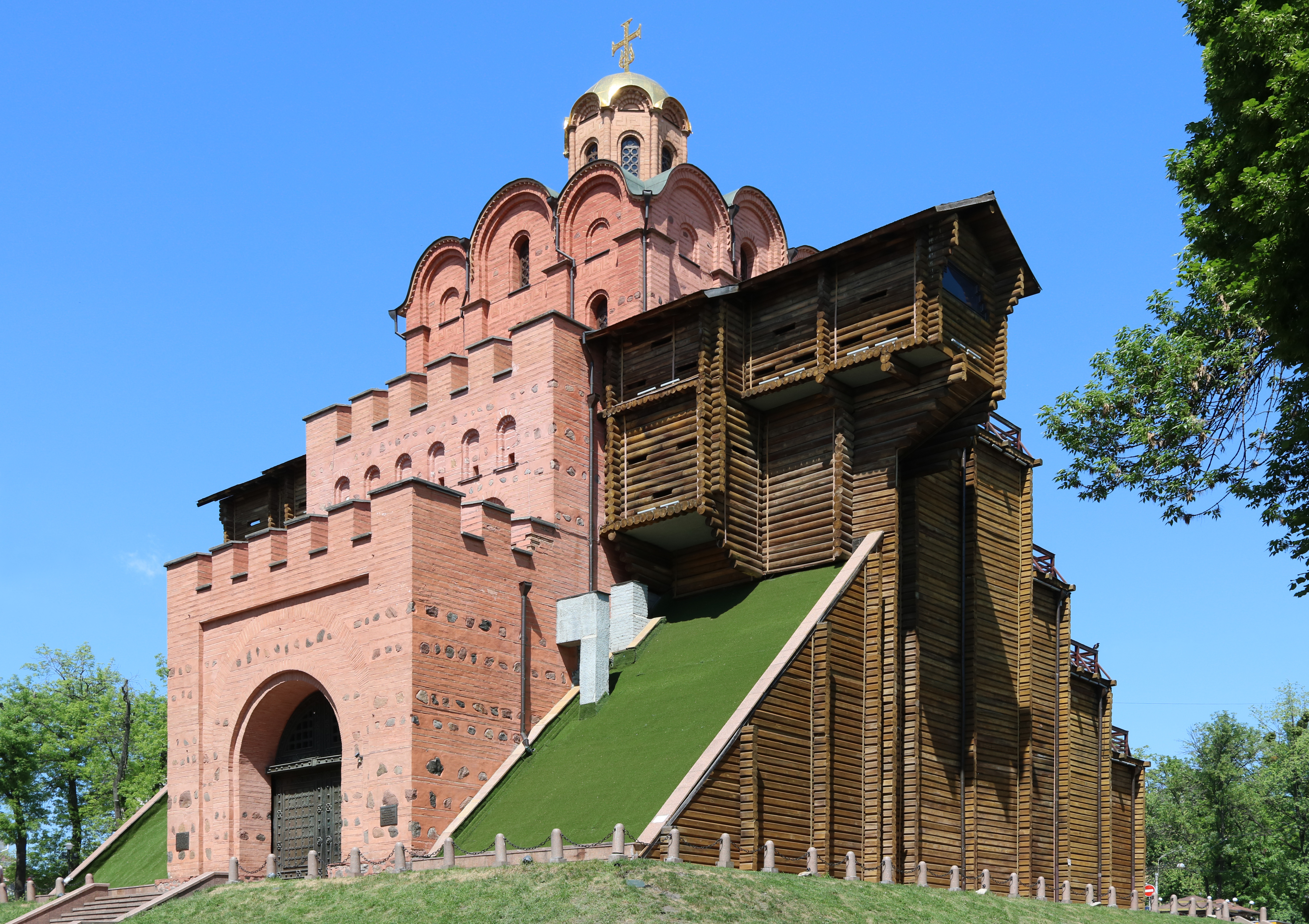
The Golden Gate, Kyiv in 2018

Yaroslav, known as "the Wise", struggled for power with his brothers. A son of Vladimir the Great, he was prince of Novgorod at the time of his father's death in 1015.

Although he first established his rule over Kiev in 1019, he did not have uncontested rule of all of Kievan Rus' until 1036. Like Vladimir, Yaroslav was eager to improve relations with the rest of Europe, especially the Byzantine Empire. Yaroslav's granddaughter, Eupraxia, the daughter of his son Vsevolod I, was married to Henry IV, Holy Roman Emperor. Yaroslav also arranged marriages for his sister and three daughters to the kings of Poland, France, Hungary and Norway.

Yaroslav promulgated the first law code of Kievan Rus', the Russkaya Pravda; built Saint Sophia Cathedral in Kiev and Saint Sophia Cathedral in Novgorod; patronized local clergy and monasticism; and is said to have founded a school system. Yaroslav's sons developed the great Kiev Pechersk Lavra (monastery).

=== Succession issues ===
The principalities of later Kievan Rus' (c.1054–1132)

In the centuries that followed the state's foundation, Rurik's descendants shared power over Kievan Rus'. The means by which royal power was transferred from one Rurikid ruler to the next is unclear, however, historian Paul Magocsi mentioned that 'Scholars have debated what the actual system of succession was or whether there was any system at all.' According to historian Nancy Shields Kollmann, the rota system was used with the princely succession moving from elder to younger brother and from uncle to nephew, as well as from father to son. Junior members of the dynasty usually began their official careers as rulers of a minor district, progressed to more lucrative principalities, and then competed for the coveted throne of Kiev. Whatever the case, according to professor Ivan Katchanovski 'no adequate system of succession to the Kievan throne was developed' after the death of Yaroslav the Wise (r. 1019–1054), commencing a process of gradual disintegration.

The unconventional power succession system fomented constant hatred and rivalry within the royal family. Familicide was frequently deployed to obtain power and can be traced particularly during the time of the Yaroslavichi (sons of Yaroslav), when the established succession system was skipped in the establishment of Vladimir II Monomakh as the Grand Prince of Kiev (r. 1113–1125), in turn creating major squabbles between the Olegovichi (sons of Oleg I) from Chernigov, the Monomakhovichi from Pereyaslavl, the Izyaslavichi (sons of Iziaslav) from Turov–Volhynia, and the Polotsk Princes. The position of the grand prince of Kiev was weakened by the growing influence of regional clans.

=== Fragmentation and decline ===
The rival Principality of Polotsk was contesting the power of the Grand Prince by occupying Novgorod, while Rostislav Vladimirovich was fighting for the Black Sea port of Tmutarakan belonging to Chernigov. Three of Yaroslav's sons who first allied together found themselves fighting each other especially after their defeat to the Cuman forces in 1068 at the Battle of the Alta River.

The ruling Grand Prince Iziaslav fled to Poland asking for support and in a couple of years returned to establish the order. The affairs became even more complicated by the end of the 11th century driving the state into chaos and constant warfare. On the initiative of Vladimir II Monomakh in 1097 the Council of Liubech of Kievan Rus' took place near Chernigov with the main intention to find an understanding among the fighting sides.

By 1130, all descendants of Vseslav the Seer had been exiled to the Byzantine Empire by Mstislav the Great. The most fierce resistance to the Monomakhs was posed by the Olegovichi when the izgoi Vsevolod II managed to become the Grand Prince of Kiev. The Rostislavichi, who had initially established in the lands of Galicia by 1189, were defeated by the Monomakh-Piast descendant Roman the Great.

The decline of Constantinople—a main trading partner of Kievan Rus'—played a significant role in the decline of the Kievan Rus'. The trade route from the Varangians to the Greeks, along which the goods were moving from the Black Sea (mainly Byzantine) through eastern Europe to the Baltic, was a cornerstone of Kievan wealth and prosperity. These trading routes became less important as the Byzantine Empire declined in power and Western Europe created new trade routes to Asia and the Near East. As people relied less on passing through the territories of Kievan Rus' for trade, the economy of Kievan Rus' suffered.

The last ruler to maintain a united state was Mstislav the Great. After his death in 1132, Kievan Rus' fell into recession and a rapid decline, and Mstislav's successor Yaropolk II of Kiev, instead of focusing on the external threat of the Cumans, was embroiled in conflicts with the growing power of the Novgorod Republic. In March 1169, a coalition of native princes led by Andrei Bogolyubsky of Vladimir sacked Kiev. This changed the perception of Kiev and was evidence of the fragmentation of the Kievan Rus'. By the end of the 12th century, the Kievan state fragmented even further, into roughly twelve different principalities.

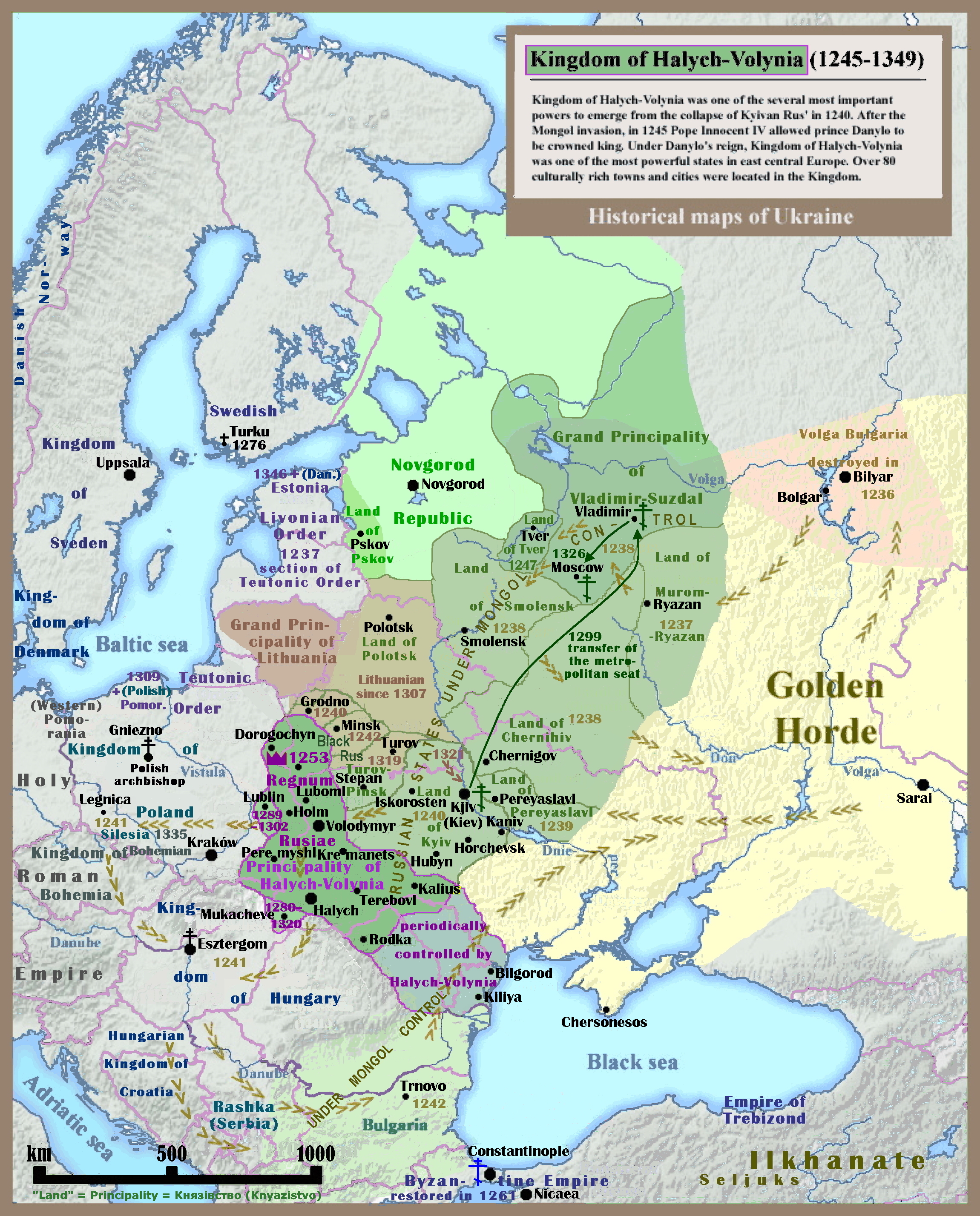
Lilac borders: Kingdom of Galicia–Volhynia, one of the successor states of Kievan Rus'

The Crusades brought a shift in European trade routes that accelerated the decline of Kievan Rus'. In 1204, the forces of the Fourth Crusade sacked Constantinople, making the Dnieper trade route marginal. At the same time, the Livonian Brothers of the Sword (of the Northern Crusades) were conquering the Baltic region and threatening the Lands of Novgorod.

In the north, the Novgorod Republic prospered because it controlled trade routes from the River Volga to the Baltic Sea. As Kievan Rus' declined, Novgorod became more independent. A local oligarchy ruled Novgorod; major government decisions were made by a town assembly, which also elected a prince as the city's military leader. In 1136, Novgorod revolted against Kiev, and became independent. Now an independent city republic, and referred to as "Lord Novgorod the Great" it would spread its "mercantile interest" to the west and the north; to the Baltic Sea and the low-populated forest regions, respectively.

In 1199, Prince Roman Mstislavych united the two previously separate principalities of Galicia and Volhynia. His son Daniel (r. 1238–1264) looked for support from the West. He accepted a crown from the Roman papacy.

=== Final disintegration ===
Following the Mongol invasion of Cumania (or the Kipchaks), in which case many Cuman rulers fled to Rus', such as Köten, the state finally disintegrated under the pressure of the Mongol invasion of Kievan Rus', fragmenting it into successor principalities who paid tribute to the Golden Horde (the so-called Tatar Yoke). Just prior to the Mongol invasion, Kievan Rus' had been a relatively prosperous region. International trade as well as skilled artisans flourished, while its farms produced enough to feed the urban population. After the invasion of the late 1230s, the economy shattered, and its population were either slaughtered or sold into slavery; while skilled laborers and artisans were sent to the Mongol's steppe regions.

On the southwestern periphery, Kievan Rus' was succeeded by the Principality of Galicia-Volhynia. Later, as these territories, now part of modern central Ukraine and Belarus, fell to the Gediminids, the powerful, largely Ruthenized Grand Duchy of Lithuania drew heavily on the cultural and legal traditions of the Rus'. From 1398 until the Union of Lublin in 1569, its full name was the Grand Duchy of Lithuania, Ruthenia and Samogitia.

On the north-eastern periphery of Kievan Rus', traditions were adapted in the Vladimir-Suzdal principality that gradually gravitated towards Moscow. To the very north, the Novgorod and Pskov feudal republics were less autocratic than Vladimir-Suzdal-Moscow until they were absorbed by the Grand Duchy of Moscow. Modern historians from Belarus, Russia and Ukraine alike consider Kievan Rus' the first period of their modern countries' histories.

== Society ==
=== Culture ===
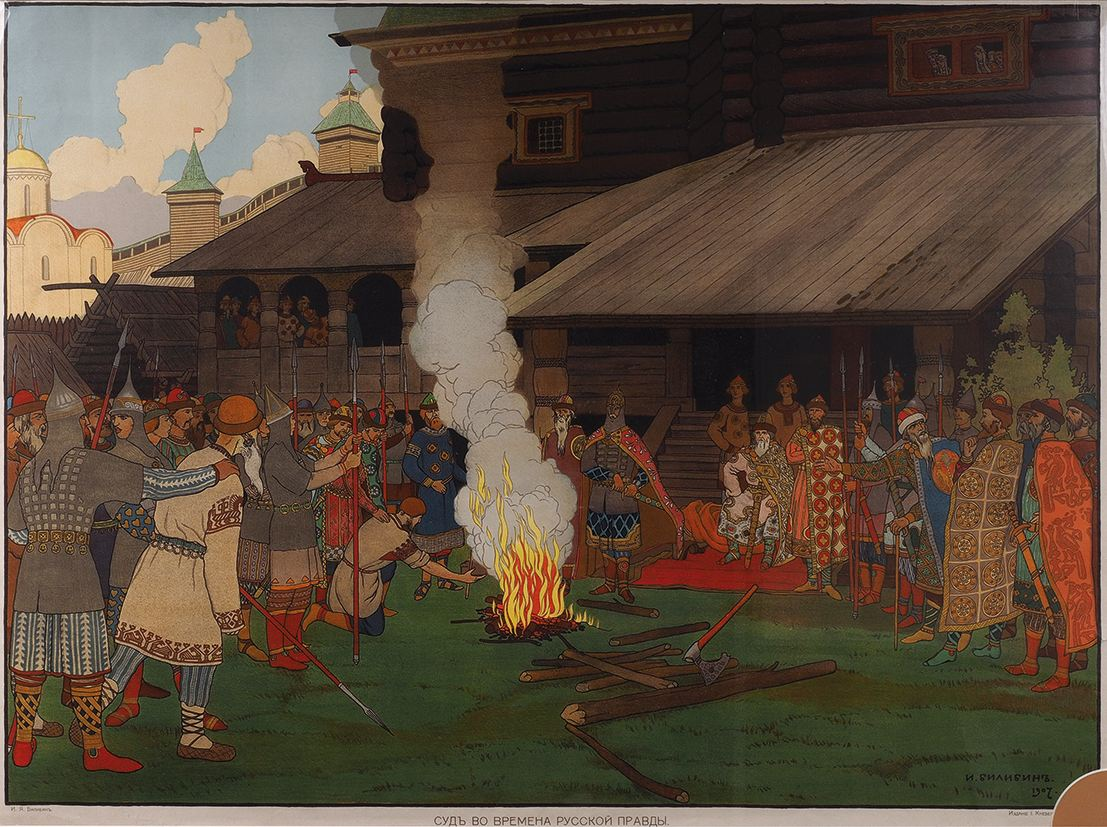
Administering justice in Kievan Rus', by Ivan Bilibin

The lands of Kievan Rus' were mostly made up of forests and steppes (see East European forest steppe and Central European mixed forests), while its main rivers all originated in the Valdai Hills: the Dnieper, and primarily populated by Slavic and Finnic tribes. All tribes were hunter-gatherers to a certain degree, but the Slavs were primarily agriculturalists, growing cereal grains and crops, as well as raising livestock. Before the emergence of the Kievan state, these tribes had their own leaders and gods, and interaction between tribes was occasionally marked either by trading goods or fighting battles. The most valuable commodities traded were captive slaves and fur pelts (usually in exchange for silver coins or oriental finery), and common trade partners were Volga Bolghar, Khazar Itil and Byzantine Chersonesus. By the early 9th century, bands of Scandinavian adventurers known as Varangians and later Rus' started plundering various (Slavic) villages in the region, later extracting tribute in exchange for protection against pillaging by other Varangians. Over time, these relationships of tribute for protection evolved into more permanent political structures: the Rus' lords became princes and the Slavic populace their subjects.

=== Economy ===
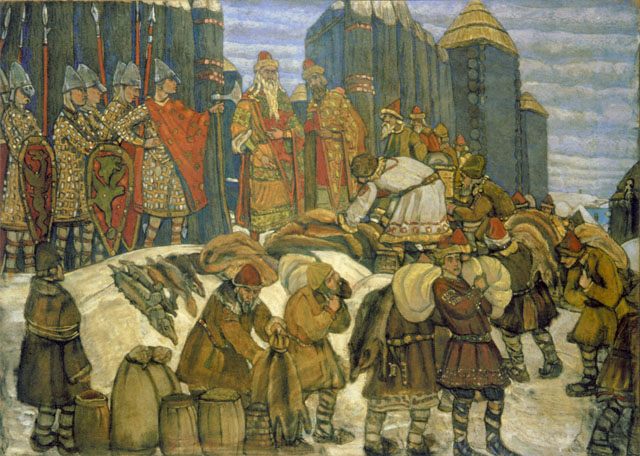
Gathering tribute. 1908 painting by Nicholas Roerich.

In the early 10th century, Kievan Rus' mainly traded with other tribes in Eastern Europe and Scandinavia. "There was little need for complex social structures to carry out these exchanges in the forests north of the steppes. So long as the entrepreneurs operated in small numbers and kept to the north, they did not catch the attention of observers or writers". The Rus' also had strong trading ties to Byzantium, particularly in the early 900s, as treaties in 911 and 944 indicate. These treaties deal with the treatment of runaway Byzantine slaves and limitations on the amounts of certain commodities such as silk that could be bought from Byzantium. The Rus' used log rafts floated down the Dnieper River by Slavic tribes for the transport of goods, particularly slaves to Byzantium.

During the Kievan era, trade and transport depended largely on networks of rivers and portages. By this period, trade networks had expanded to cater to more than just local demand. This is evidenced by a survey of glassware found in over 30 sites ranging from Suzdal, Drutsk and Beloozero, which found that a substantial majority was manufactured in Kiev. Kiev was the main depot and transit point for trade between itself, Byzantium and the Black Sea region. Even though this trade network had already been existent, the volume of which had expanded rapidly in the 11th century. Kiev was also dominant in internal trade between the towns of Rus'; it held a monopoly on glassware products (glass vessels, glazed pottery and window glass) up until the early- to mid-12th century until which it lost its monopoly to the other towns in Rus'. Inlaid enamel production techniques was borrowed from Byzantine. Byzantine amphorae, wine and olive oil have been found along the middle Dnieper, suggesting trade between Kiev, along trade towns to Byzantium.

In winter, the ruler of Kiev went out on rounds, visiting Dregovichs, Krivichs, Drevlians, Severians, and other subordinated tribes. Some paid tribute in money, some in furs or other commodities, and some in slaves. This system was called poliudie.

=== Religion ===
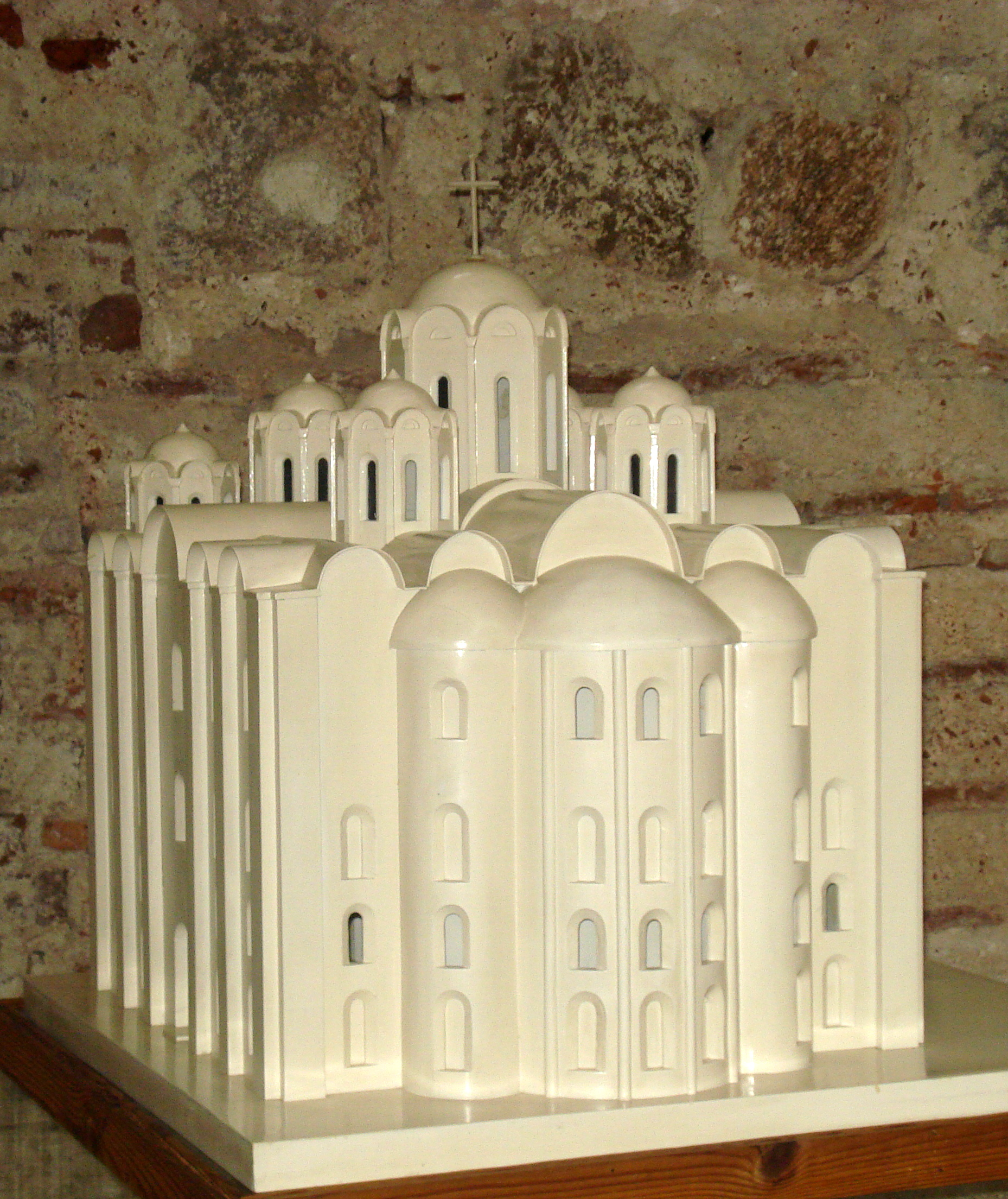
Saint Sophia Cathedral in Polotsk (rebuilt in the mid-18th century after destruction by the Russian army)

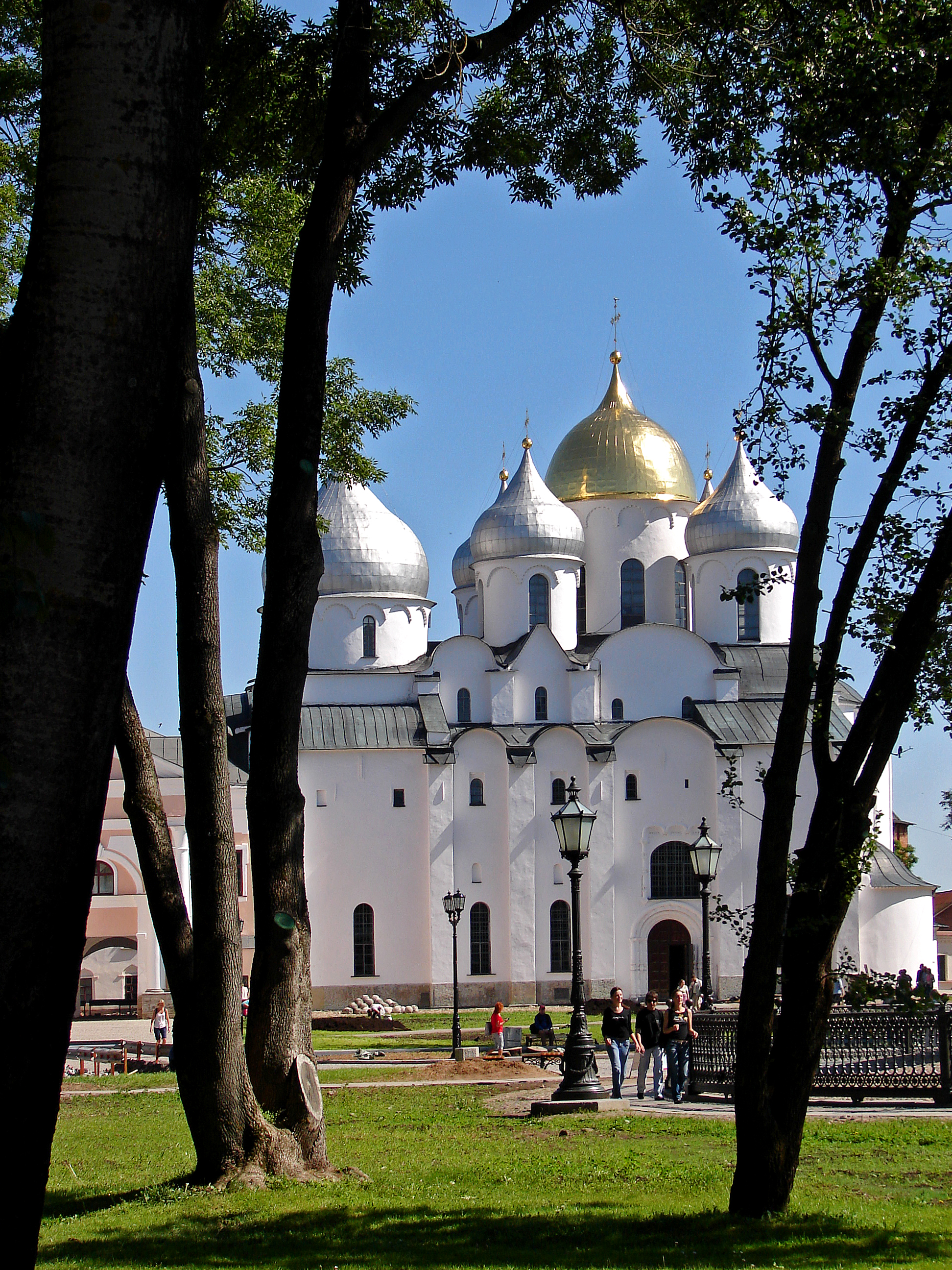
Cathedral of St. Sophia, Novgorod, mid-11th century

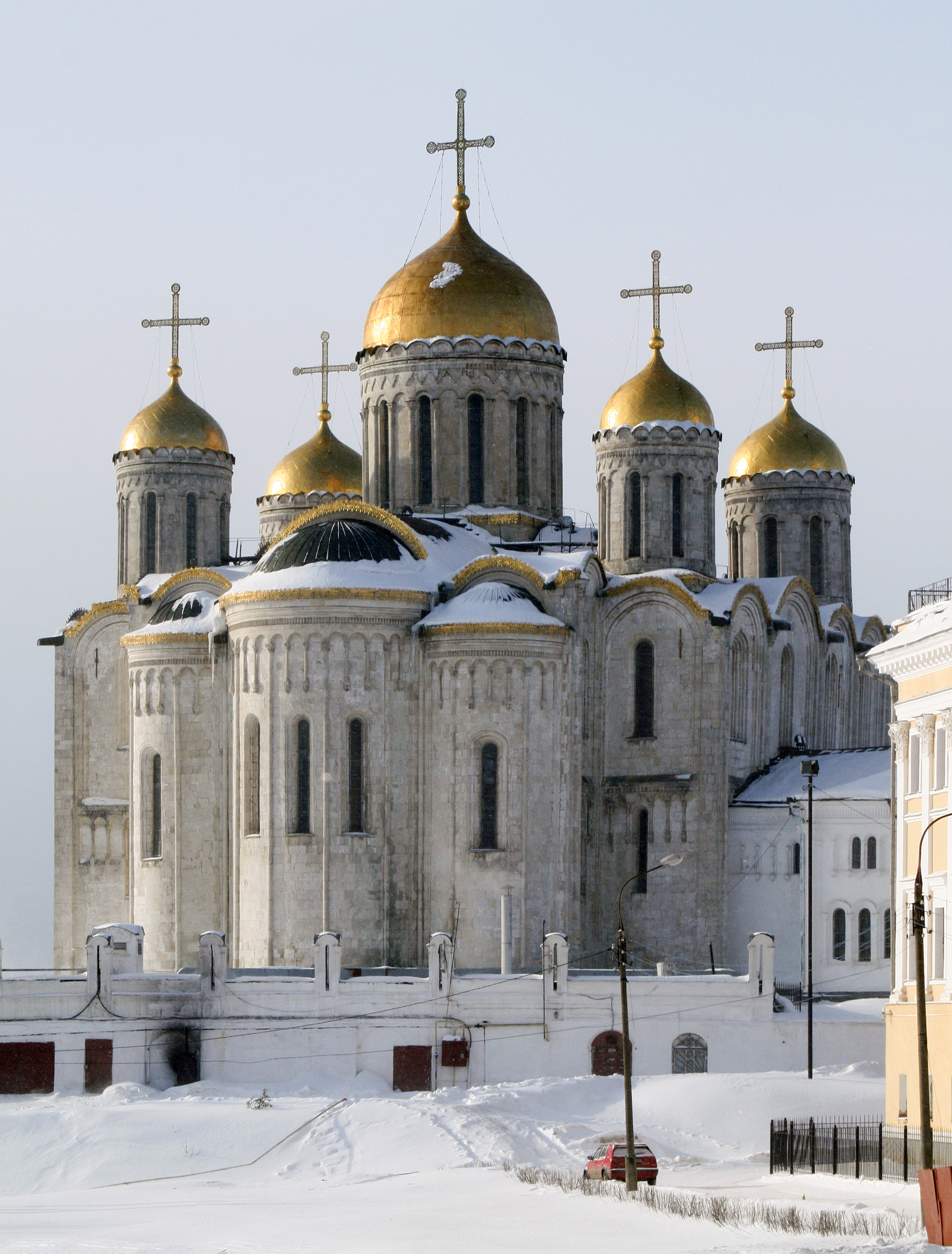
Dormition Cathedral, Vladimir, 1160

According to Martin (2009), 'Christianity, Judaism, and Islam had long been known in these lands, and Olga personally converted to Christianity. When Vladimir assumed the throne, however, he set idols of Norse, Slav, Finn, and Iranian gods, worshipped by the disparate elements of his society, on a hilltop in Kiev in an attempt to create a single pantheon for his people. But for reasons that remain unclear he soon abandoned this attempt in favour of Christianity.'

=== Architecture ===
The architecture of Kievan Rus' is the earliest period of Russian, Ukrainian and Belarusian architecture, using the foundations of Byzantine culture, but with great use of innovations and architectural features. Most remains are Russian Orthodox churches or parts of the gates and fortifications of cities.

== Administrative divisions ==
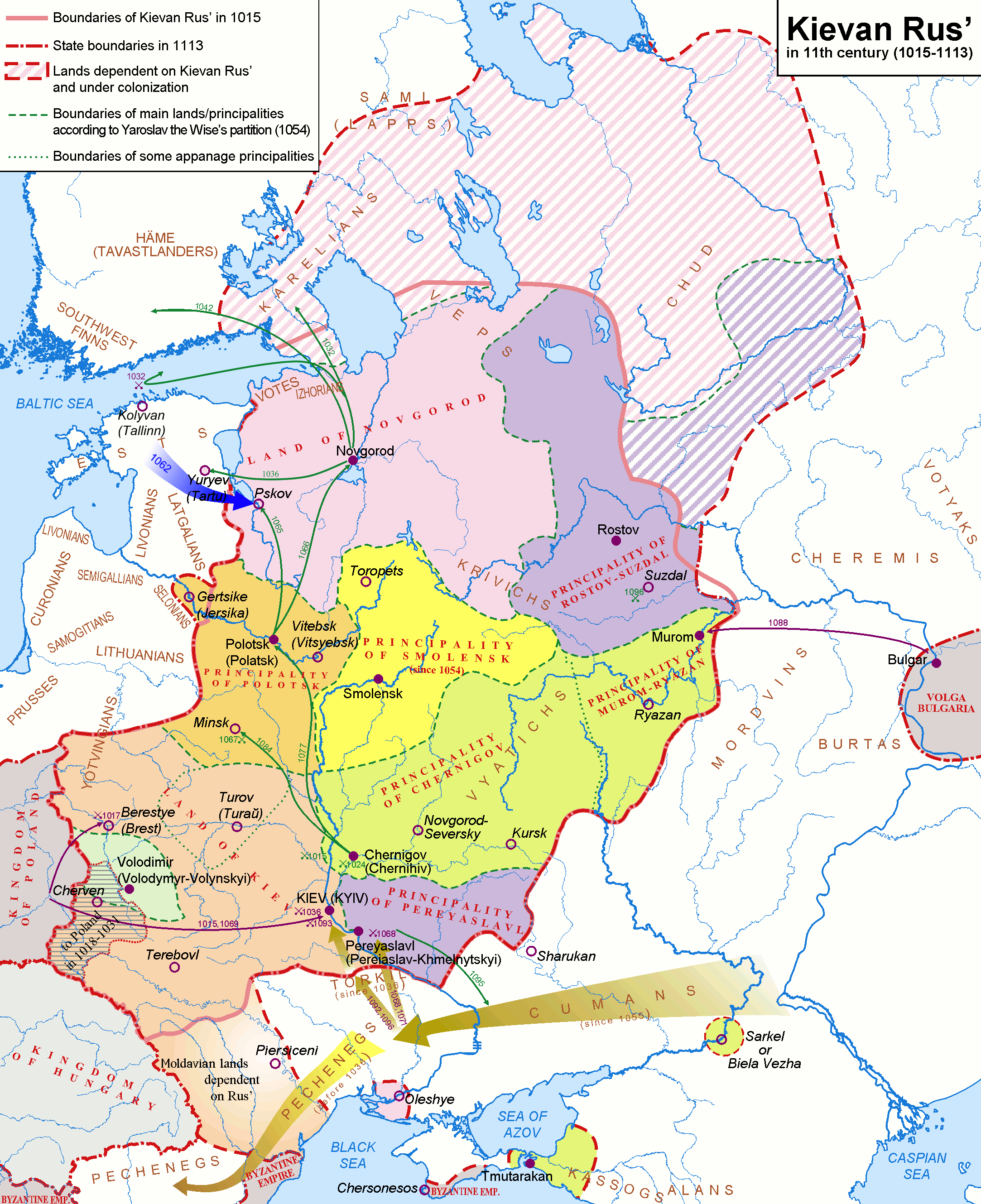
Kievan Rus' in 1015–1113

The East Slavic lands were originally divided into princely domains called zemlias, "lands", or volosts (from a term meaning "power" or "government"). A smaller clan-sized unit was called a verv, or pogost, headed by a kopa or viche.

From the 11th to 13th centuries the principalities were divided into volosts, its centre usually called a pryhorod (or Gord a fortified settlement). A volost consisted of several vervs or hromadas (commune or community). A local official was called a volostel or starosta.

Yaroslav the Wise assigned priority to the major principalities to reduce familial conflict over succession.

1. Principality of Kiev and Novgorod, for the eldest son Iziaslav I of Kiev, who became grand prince.
2. Principality of Chernigov and Tmutarakan, for Sviatoslav II of Kiev
3. Principality of Pereyaslavl and Rostov-Suzdal, for Vsevolod I of Kiev
4. Principality of Smolensk, for Vyacheslav Yaroslavich
5. Principality of Volhynia, for Igor Yaroslavich

Not mentioned by Yaroslav were Principality of Polotsk, ruled by Yaroslav's older brother Iziaslav of Polotsk that was to remain under the control of his descendants, and the Principality of Galicia, eventually taken by the dynasty of his grandson Rostyslav.

== Foreign relations ==
=== Military history ===
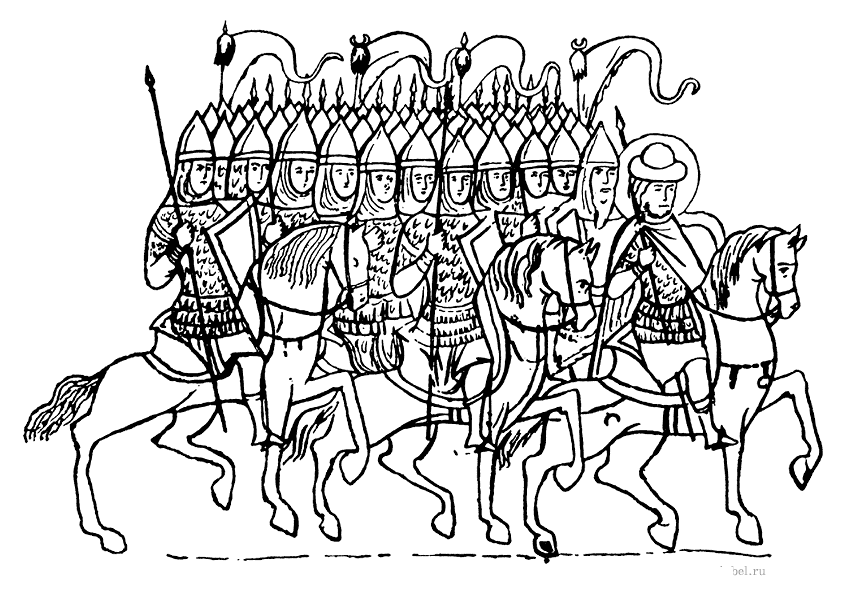
Druzhyna: princely cavalry.

The military of Kievan Rus' served as the armed forces of Kievan Rus' between the 9th to 13th century. It was mainly characterised by infantry armies of town militia that were supported by druzhyna cavalry.

=== Steppe peoples ===
From the 9th century on, the Pecheneg nomads had an uneasy relationship with Kievan Rus'. For over two centuries they launched sporadic raids into Rus', which sometimes escalated into full-scale wars, such as the 920 war on the Pechenegs by Igor of Kiev, reported in the Primary Chronicle, but there were also temporary military alliances e.g., the 943 Byzantine campaign by Igor. (Note: Ibn Haukal describes the Pechenegs as long-standing allies of the Rus' people, whom they invariably accompanied during the 10th-century Caspian expeditions.) In 968, the Pechenegs attacked and besieged the city of Kiev.

Boniak was a Cuman khan who led a series of invasions on Kievan Rus'. In 1096, Boniak attacked Kiev, plundered the Kiev Monastery of the Caves, and burned down the prince's palace in Berestovo. He was defeated in 1107 by Vladimir Monomakh, Oleg, Sviatopolk and other princes of Rus'.

=== Byzantine Empire ===
Byzantium quickly became the main trading and cultural partner for Kiev, but relations were not always friendly. One of the largest military accomplishments of the Rurikid dynasty was the attack on Byzantium in 960. Pilgrims of the Rus' had been making the journey from Kiev to Constantinople for many years, and Constantine Porphyrogenitus, the Emperor of the Byzantine Empire, believed that this gave them significant information about the arduous parts of the journey and where travelers were most at risk, as would be pertinent for an invasion. This route took travelers through domain of the Pechenegs, journeying mostly by river. In June 941, the Rus' staged a naval ambush on Byzantine forces, making up for their smaller numbers with small, maneuverable boats. These boats were ill-equipped for the transportation of large quantities of treasure, suggesting that looting was not the goal. The raid was led, according to the Primary Chronicle, by a king called Igor. Three years later, the treaty of 944 stated that all ships approaching Byzantium must be preceded by a letter from the Rurikid prince stating the number of ships and assuring their peaceful intent. This not only indicates fear of another surprise attack, but an increased Kievan presence in the Black Sea.

=== Mongols ===
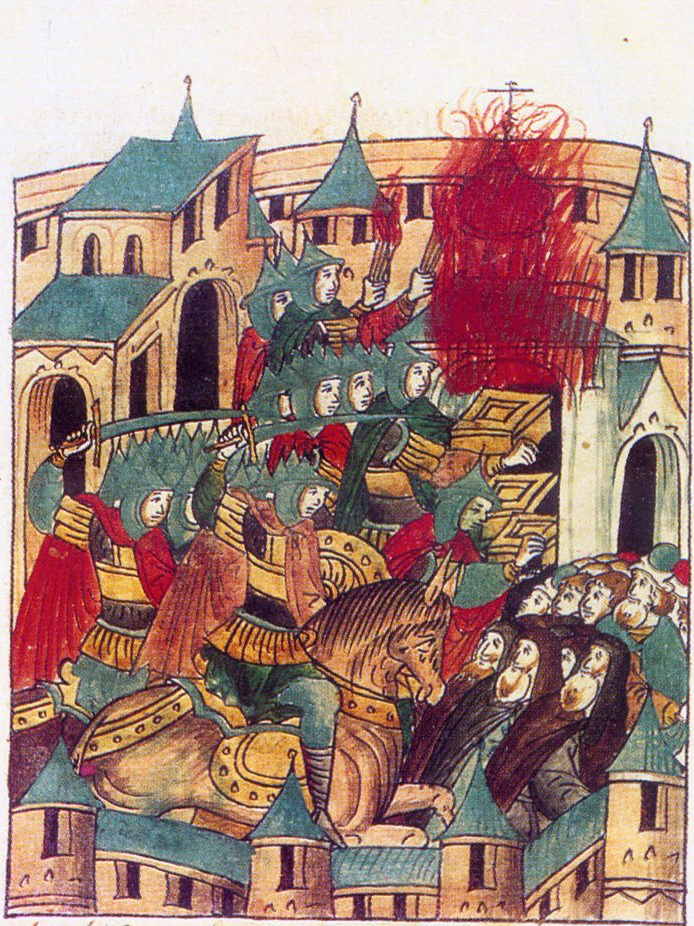
The sacking of Suzdal by Batu Khan

The Mongol Empire invaded Kievan Rus' in the 13th century, devastating numerous cities, including Ryazan, Kolomna, Moscow, Vladimir and Kiev. The siege of Kiev in 1240 by the Mongols is generally understood as the end of Kievan Rus'. Batu Khan went on to subjugate Galicia and Volhynia, raid Poland and Hungary, and founded the Golden Horde at Sarai in 1242. The conquests mostly halted due to a succession crisis following khan Ogedei's death, leading Batu to return to Mongolia to select the clan's next overlord.

== Historical assessment ==
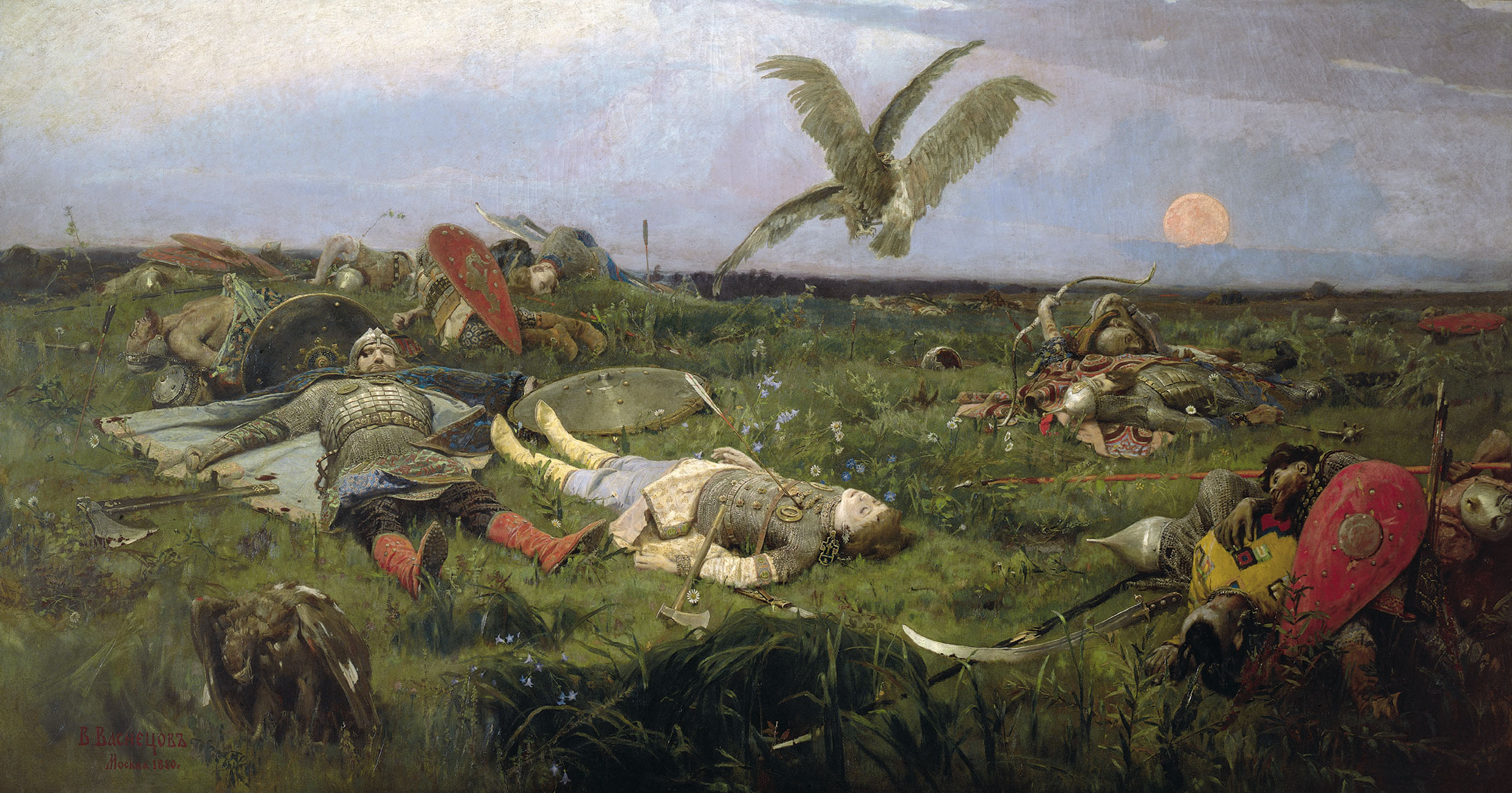
The field of Igor Svyatoslavich's battle with the Polovtsy, by Viktor Vasnetsov

Kievan Rus', although sparsely populated compared to Western Europe, was not only the largest contemporary European state in terms of area but also culturally advanced. Literacy in Kiev, Novgorod and other large cities was high. (Note: "It is to the credit of Vladimir and his advisors they built not only churches but schools as well. This compulsory baptism was followed by compulsory education... Schools were thus founded not only in Kiev but also in provincial cities. From the "Life of St. Feodosi" we know that a school existed in Kursk around the year of 1023. By the time of Yaroslav's reign (1019–54), education had struck roots and its benefits were apparent. Around 1030, Iaroslav founded a divinity school in Novgorod for 300 children of both laymen and clergy to be instructed in "book-learning". As a general measure, he made the parish priests "teach the people".") Novgorod had a sewage system and wood pavement not often found in other cities at the time. The Russkaya Pravda confined punishments to fines and generally did not use capital punishment. (Note: "The most notable aspect of the criminal provisions was that punishments took the form of seizure of property, banishment, or, more often, payment of a fine. Even murder and other severe crimes (arson, organised horse thieving, and robbery) were settled by monetary fines. Although the death penalty had been introduced by Vladimir the Great, it too was soon replaced by fines.") Certain rights were accorded to women, such as property and inheritance rights.

The economic development of Kievan Rus' may be reflected in its demographics. Scholarly estimates of Kiev's population around 1200 range from 36,000 to 50,000 (at the time, Paris had about 50,000, and London 30,000). Novgorod had about 10,000 to 15,000 inhabitants in 1000, and about double that number by 1200, while Chernigov had a larger land area than both Kiev and Novgorod at the time, and is therefore estimated have had even more inhabitants. Constantinople, then one of the largest cities in the world, had a population of about 400,000 around 1180. Soviet scholar Mikhail Tikhomirov calculated that Kievan Rus' had around 300 urban centres on the eve of the Mongol invasion.

Kievan Rus' also played an important genealogical role in European politics. Yaroslav the Wise, whose stepmother belonged to the Macedonian dynasty that ruled the Byzantine Empire from 867 to 1056, married Ingegerd Olofsdotter, the only legitimate daughter of Swedish king Olof Skötkonung who Christianized Sweden. His daughters became queens of Hungary, France and Norway; his sons married the daughters of a Polish king and Byzantine emperor, and a niece of the Pope; and his granddaughters were a German empress and (according to one theory) the queen of Scotland. A grandson married the only daughter of the last Anglo-Saxon king of England. Thus the Rurikids were a well-connected royal family of the time. (Note: "In medieval Europe, a mark of a dynasty's prestige and power was the willingness with which other leading dynasties entered into matrimonial relations with it. Measured by this standard, Yaroslav's prestige must have been great indeed... . Little wonder that Iaroslav is often dubbed by historians as 'the father-in-law of Europe.'") (Note: "By means of these marital ties, Kievan Rus' became well known throughout Europe.")

Serhii Plokhy (2006) proposed to "denationalize" Kievan Rus': contrary to what modern nationalist interpretations had been doing, he argued for 'separating Kievan Rus' as a multi-ethnic state from the national histories of Russia, Ukraine, and Belarus. This applies to the word Rus' and to the concept of the Rus' Land.' According to Halperin (2010), 'Plokhy's approach does not invalidate analysis of rival claims by Muscovy, Lithuania or Ukraine to the Kievan inheritance; it merely relegates such pretensions entirely to the realm of ideology.'

== In popular culture ==
- Finnish folk metal band Turisas has produced various songs on its albums The Varangian Way (2007) and Stand Up and Fight (2011) which feature Scandinavian names (Jarisleif in "In the Court of Jarisleif" for Grand Prince Yaroslav) and Old Norse exonyms for toponyms (such as Holmgard in "To Holmgard and Beyond" for Veliky Novgorod, and Miklagard in "Miklagard Overture" for Constantinople) connected to Kievan Rus'. According to Bosselmann (2018) and DiGioia (2020), Scandinavian names are used by Turisas 'as a way to convey the historical context of the songs' subject matter', namely 'the stories of the Scandinavian pre-Christian populations and their travels eastwards along the way known as the Way of the Varangians to the Greek to Constantinople'.

== Gallery ==
=== Collection of maps ===
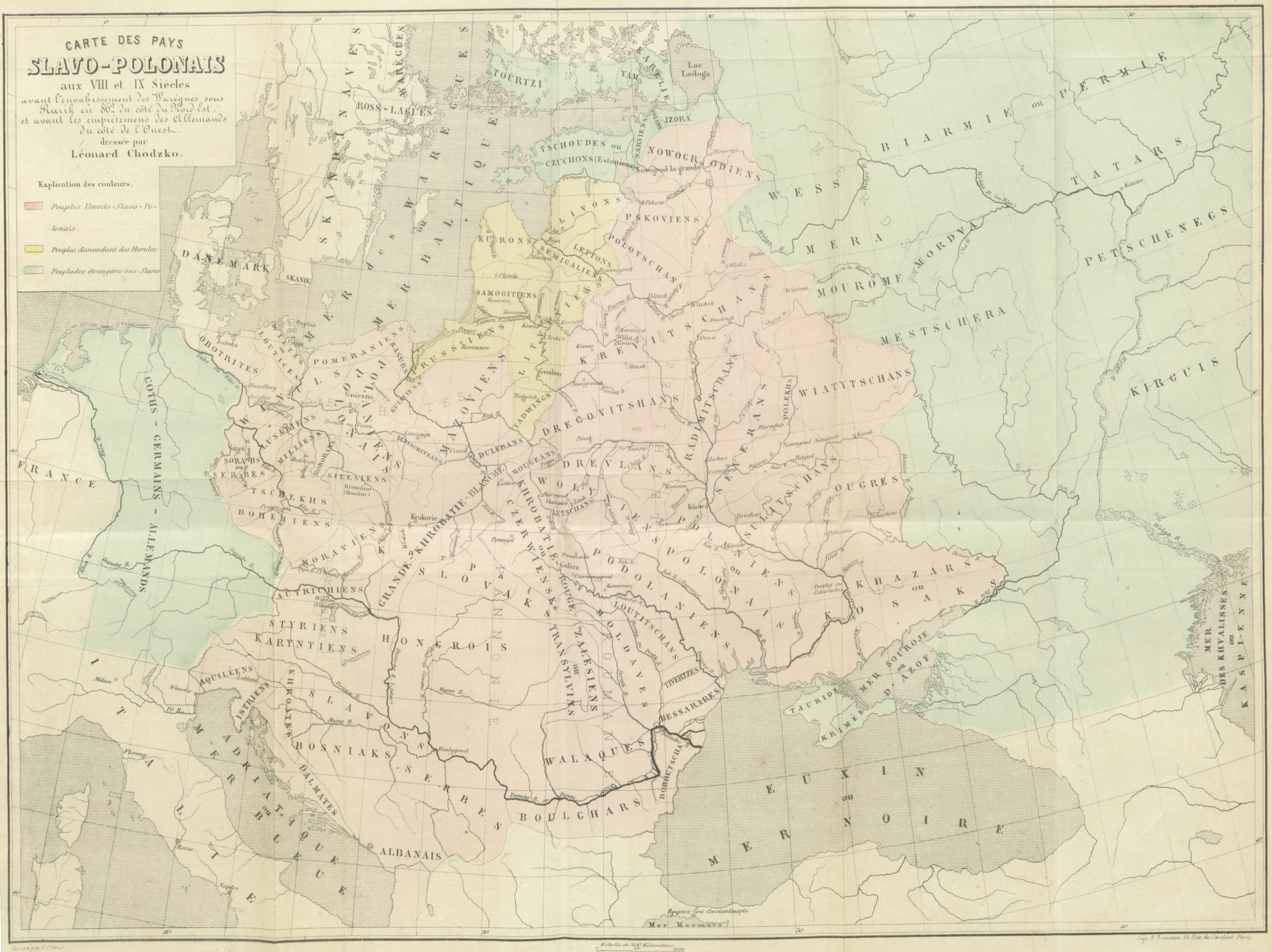
Map of 8th- to 9th-century Rus' by Leonard Chodzko (1861)

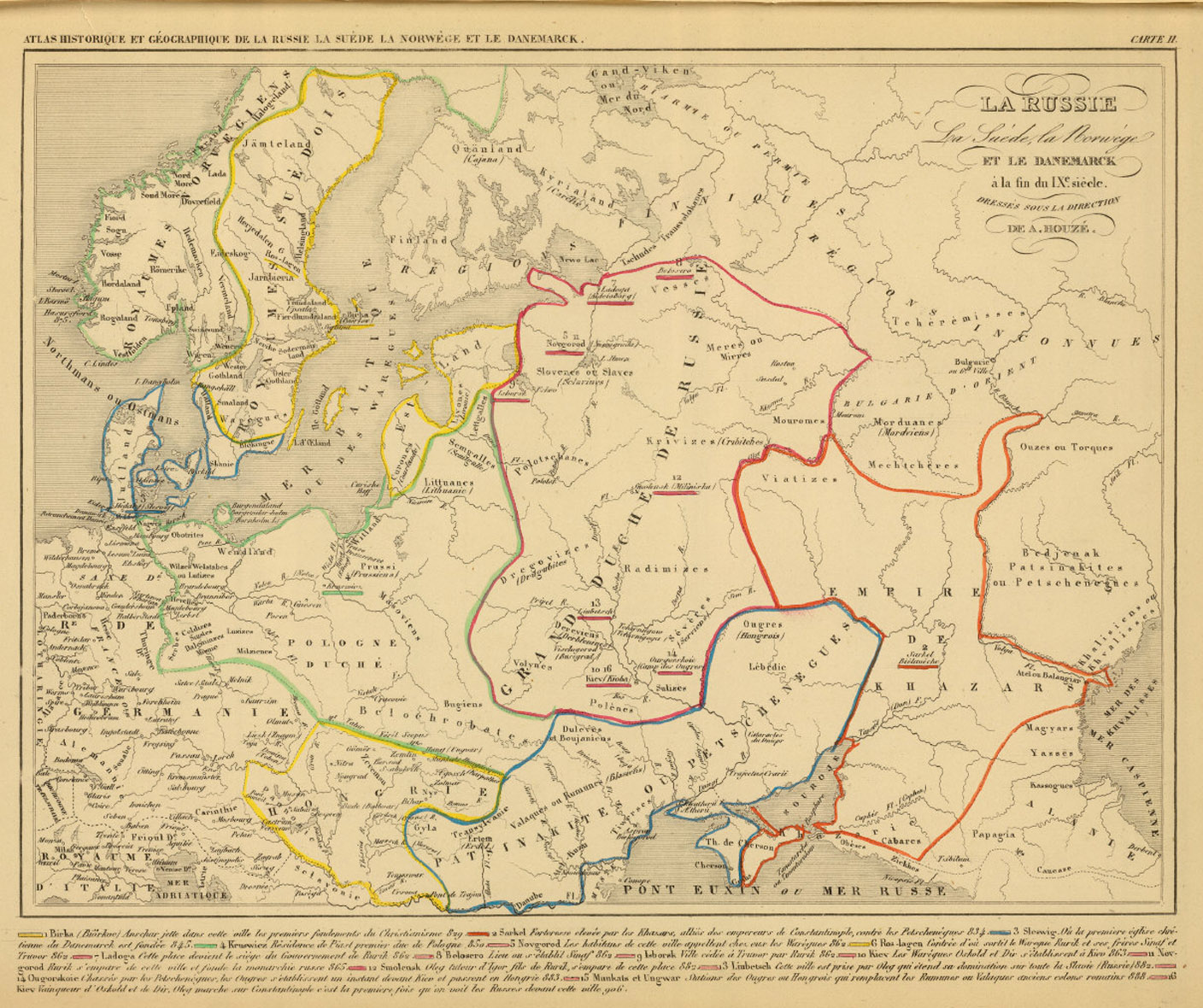
Map of 9th-century Rus' by Antoine Philippe Houze (1844)

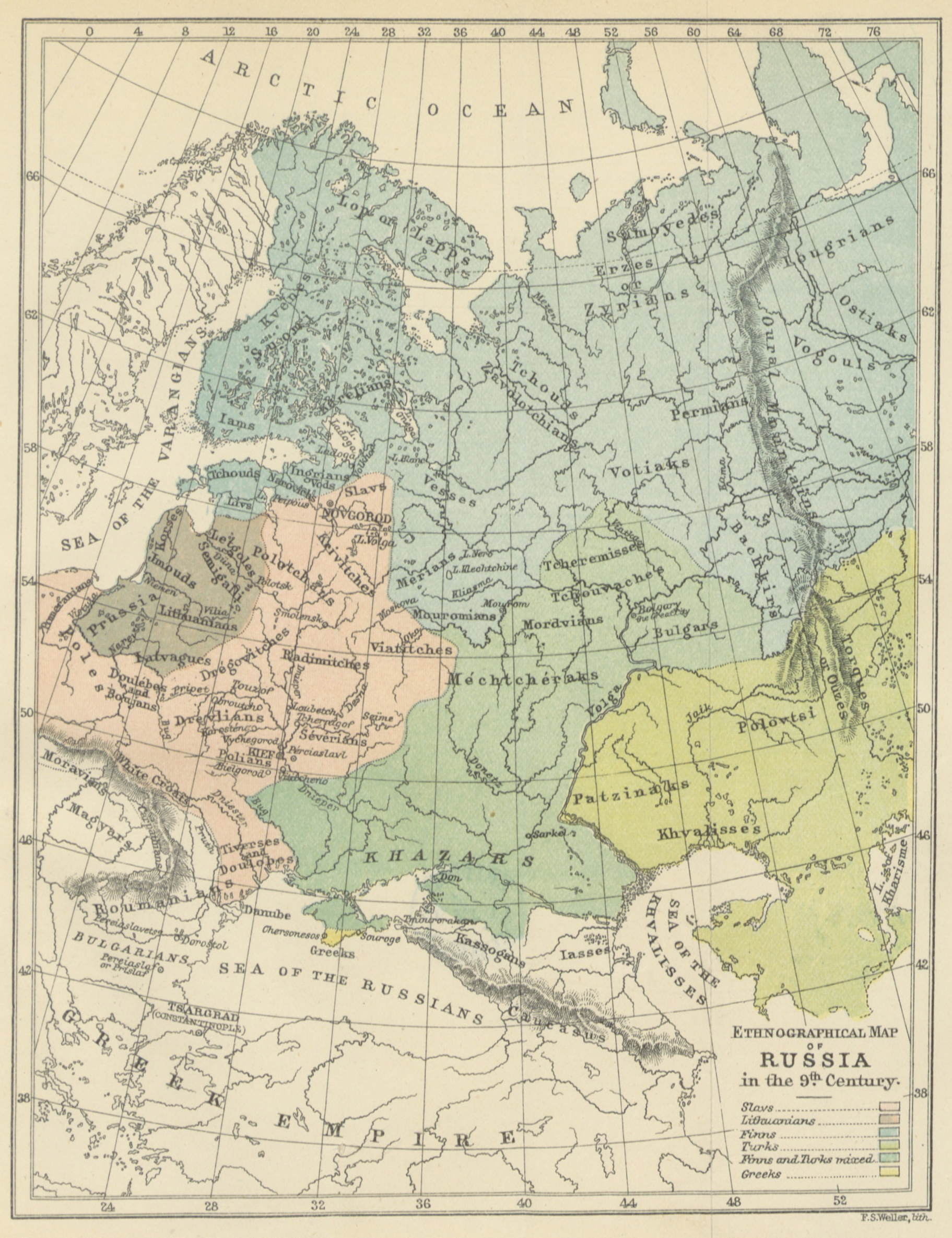
Map of 9th-century Rus' by F. S. Weller (1893)

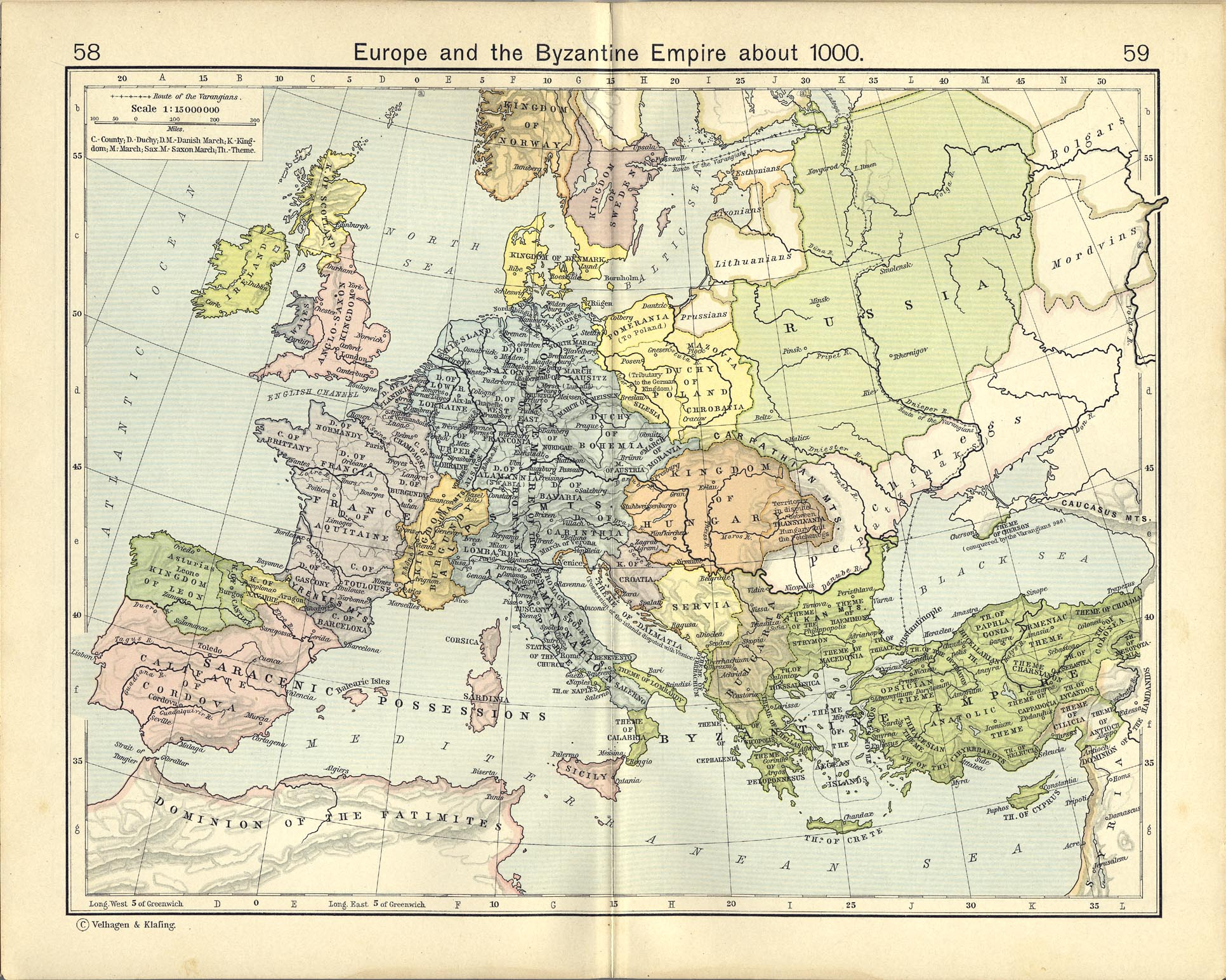
Map of Rus' in Europe in 1000 (1911)

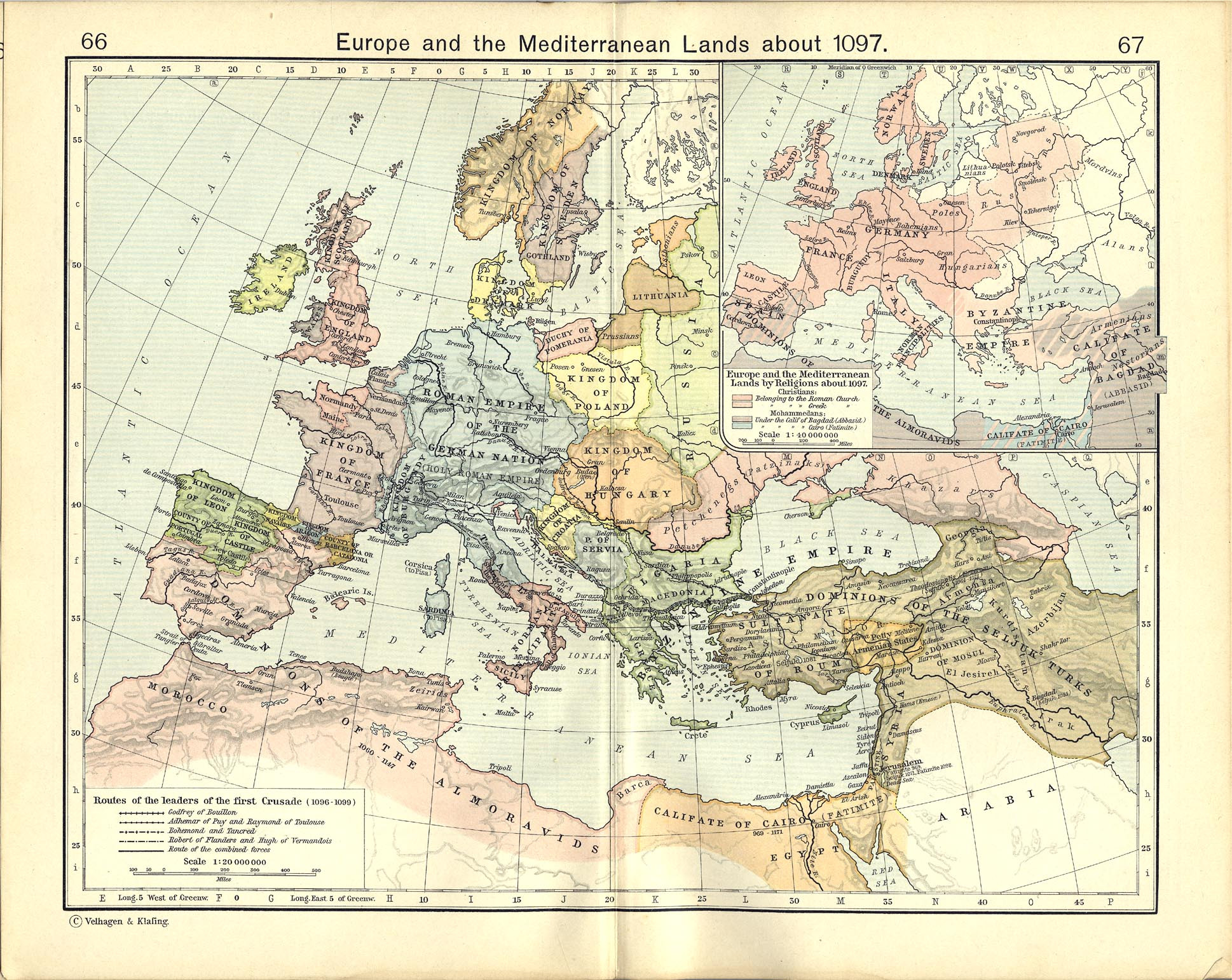
Map of Rus' in 1097 (1911)

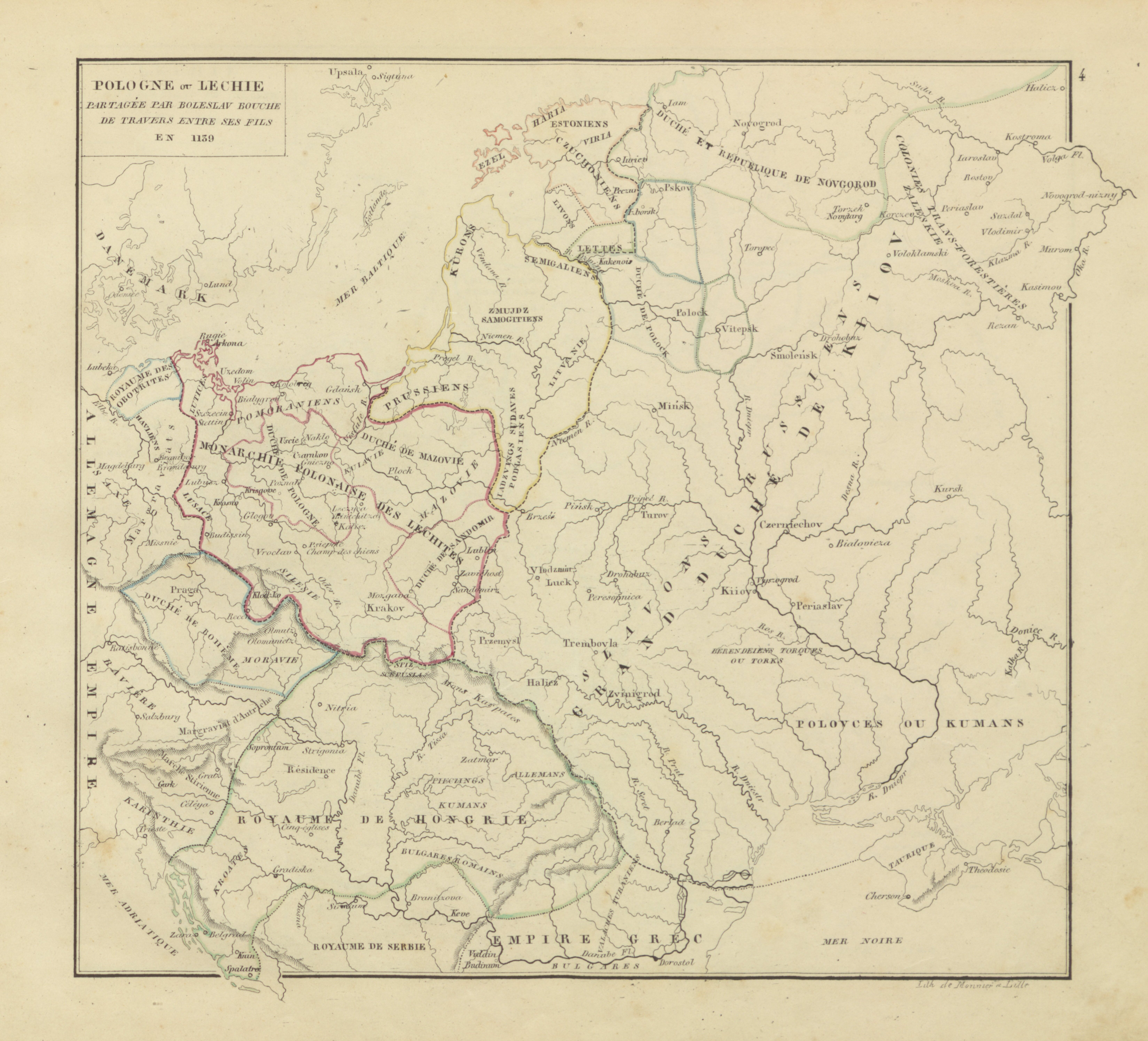
Map of 1139 by Joachim Lelewel; northeast is identified as "trans-forest colonies" (Zalesie)

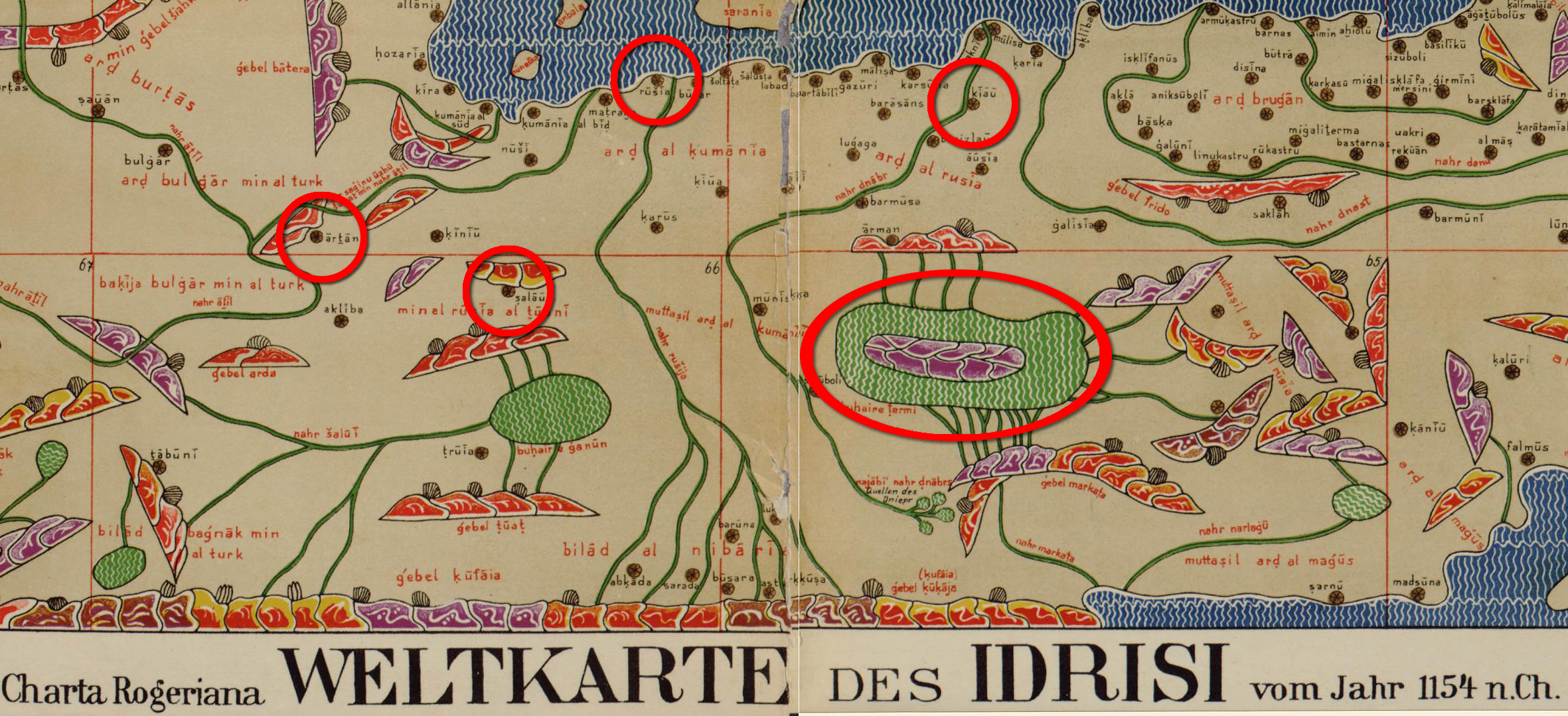
Fragment of the 1154 Tabula Rogeriana by Muhammad al-Idrisi

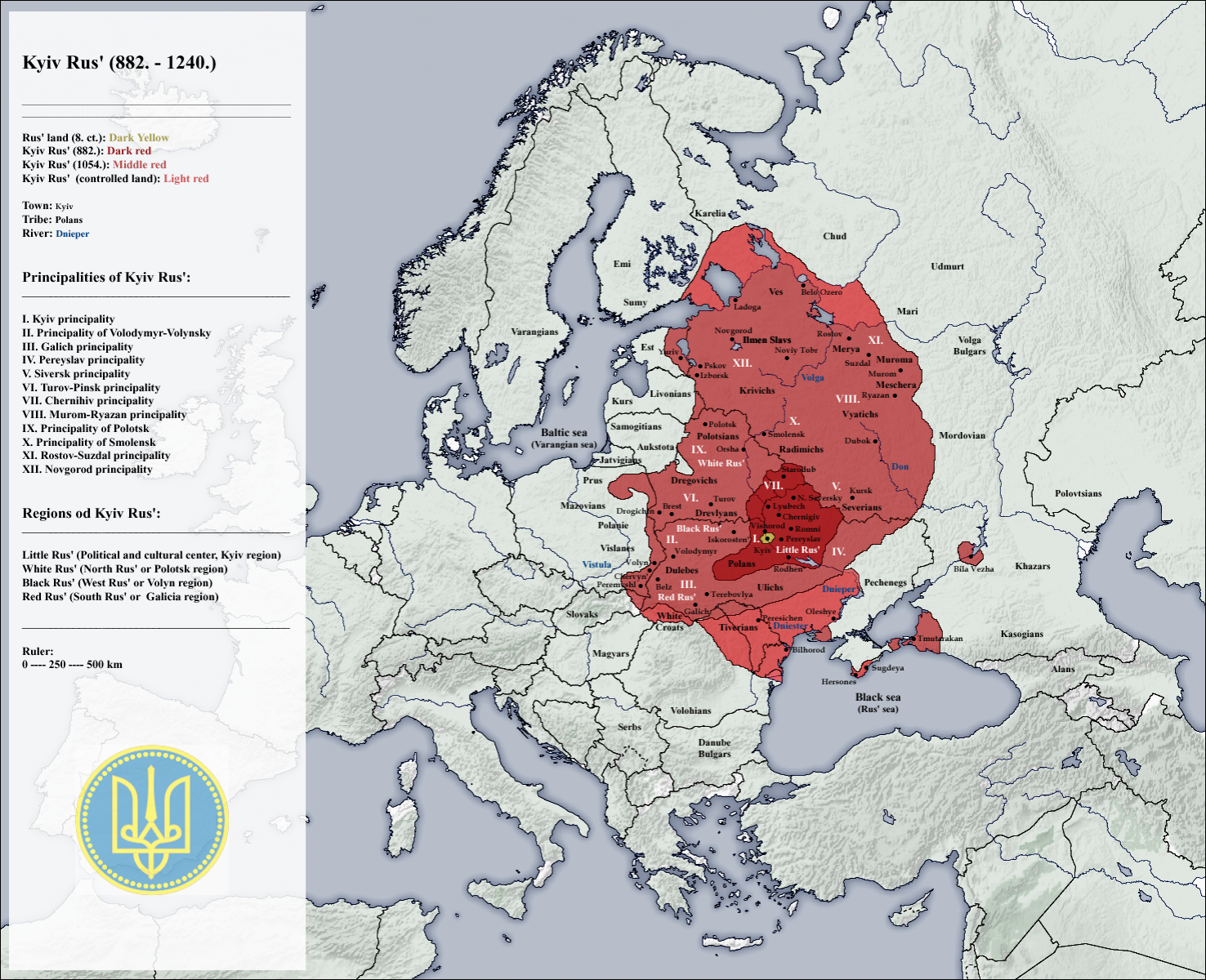
Overview of principalities of Kievan Rus'

=== Art and architecture ===
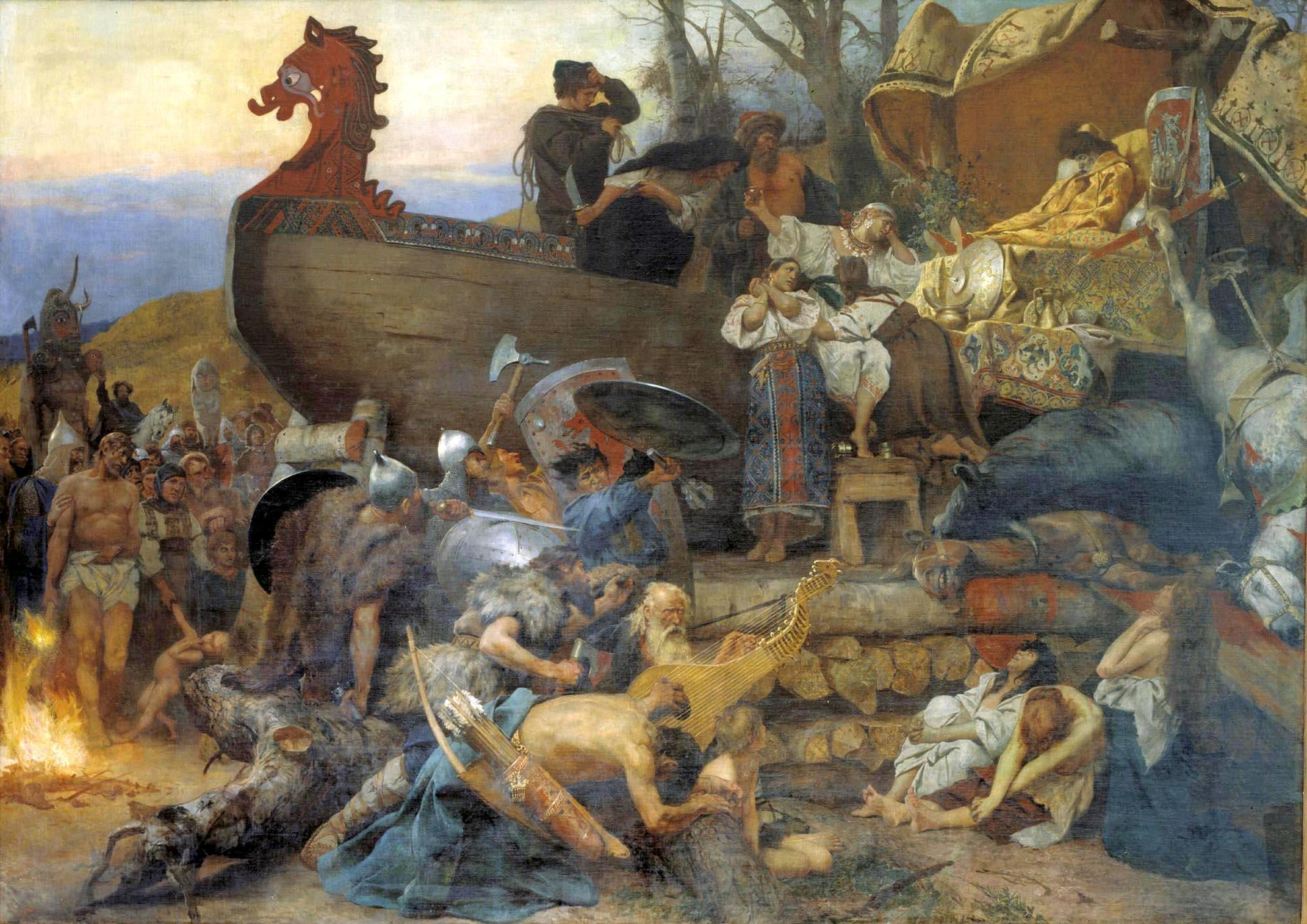
Ship burial of a Rus' chieftain as described by the Arab traveler Ahmad ibn Fadlan, who visited north-eastern Europe in the 10th century.
Henryk Siemiradzki (1883)

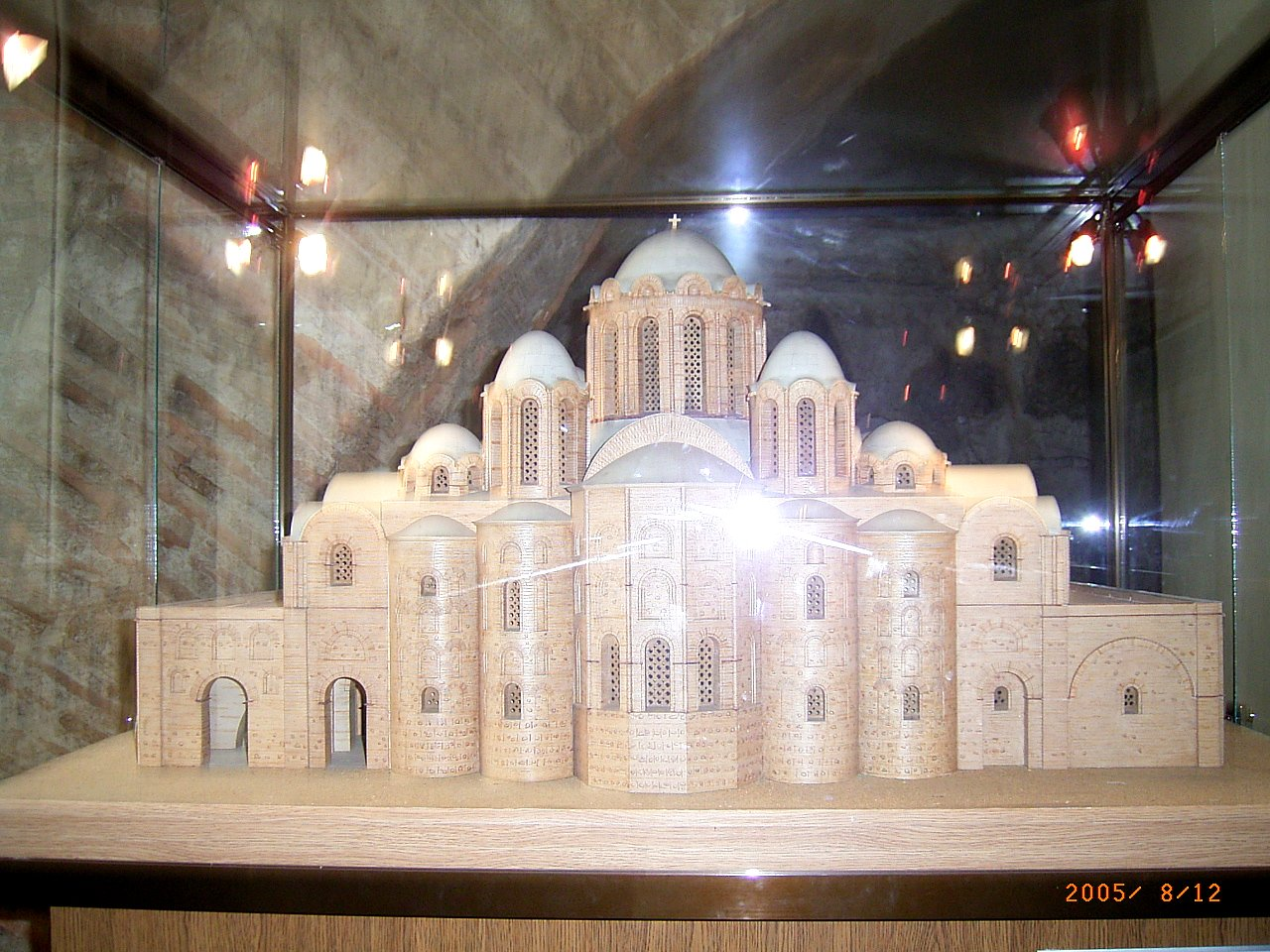
Model of the original Saint Sophia Cathedral, Kyiv; used on modern 2 hryvni of Ukraine

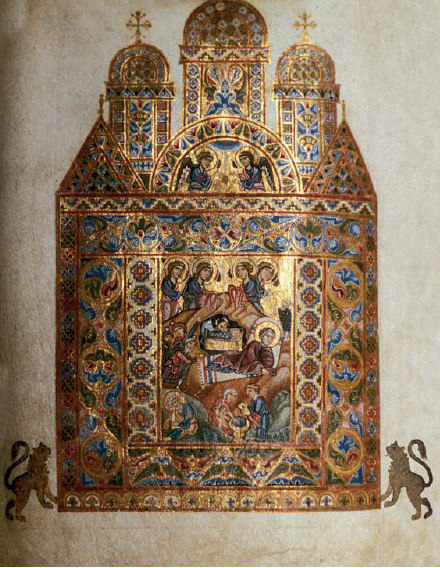
The Nativity, a Kievan (possibly Galician) illumination from the Gertrude Psalter

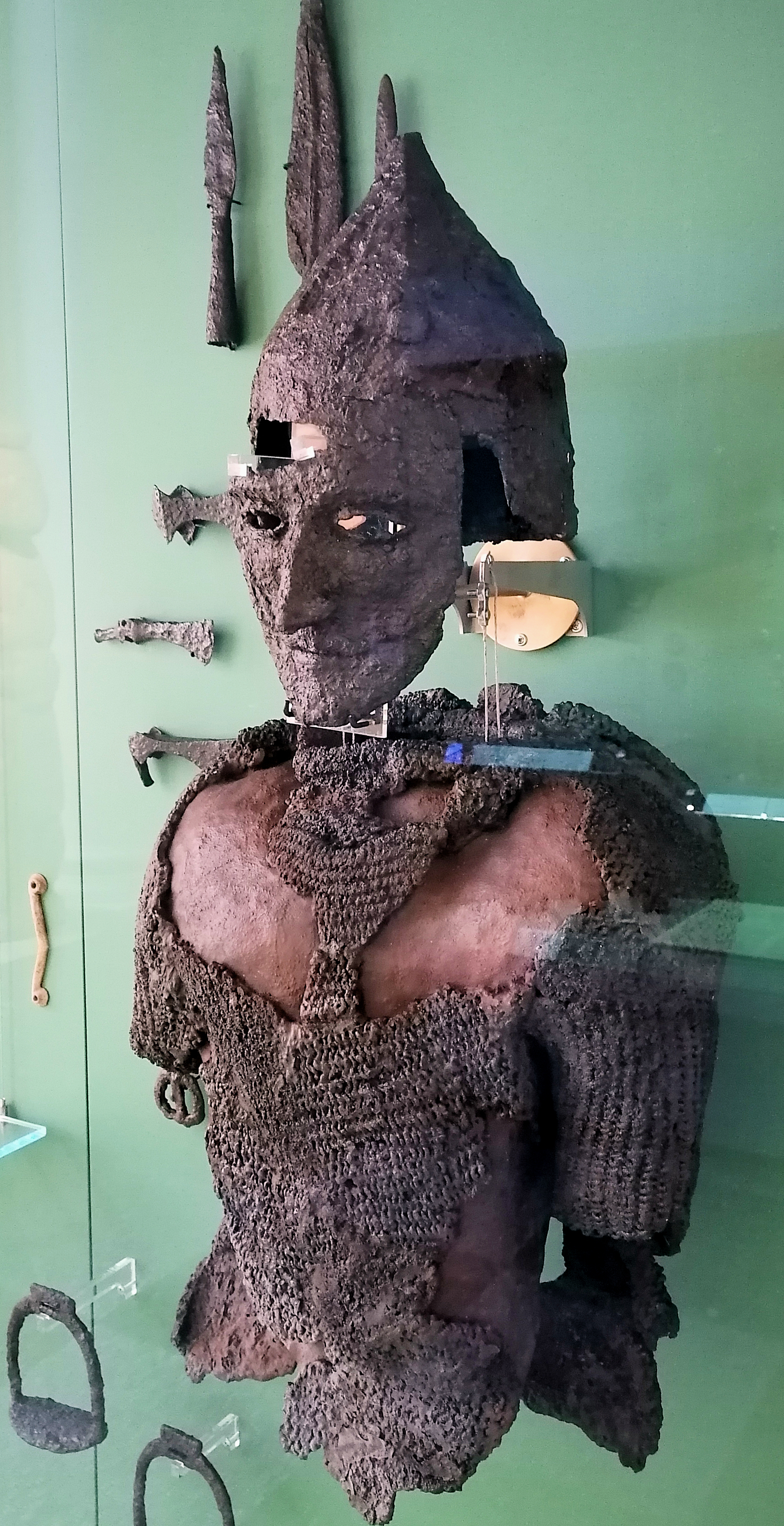
Rider armor and horse equipment. Iron, 12th–13th centuries, S. Lipovets, Kiev province, mound 264, military burial. State Hermitage Museum.

== See also ==
- Bibliography of Ukrainian history
- Outline of Ukrainian history
- De Administrando Imperio – 10th-century Byzantine source written by emperor Constantine VII
- History of Belarus
- History of Russia
- History of Ukraine
- Rus' chronicles – genre of Old East Slavic literature
- Slavic studies
- European Russia
