= Chronicler of Pereyaslavl-Suzdal =

The Chronicler of Pereyaslavl-Suzdal (Russian: Летописец Переяславля Суздальского, romanized: Letopisets Perejaslavlja Suzdal'skogo, abbreviated "LPS") is a short Rus' chronicle. Two late-15th-century manuscripts of it have been preserved, which seem to indicate a close textual relationship with the 13th-century Suzdalian Chronicle (or "Vladimir Chronicle") after 1157; before 1157, its contents are derivative of the Kievan Chronicle.

== Textual witnesses ==
- Archival long manuscript: In the long manuscript, the text calls itself Chronicler of Rus' Tsars Russian: Летописец русских царей', romanized: Letopisets russkikh tsarej. It was Imperial Russian historian and archivist Mikhail Andreyevich Obolensky (1806—1873) who gave it its name Chronicler of Pereyaslavl-Suzdal, thereby referring to Pereslavl-Zalessky in the present-day Russian Federation, as opposed to Pereiaslav (earlier known as Pereyaslavl-Yuzhnyy or Pereiaslav-Ruskyi) in present-day Ukraine. The historian found this chronicle in compilation form as part of the late-15th-century Archival collection, found by him in the files of the Ministry of Foreign Affairs of the Russian Empire. In 1851, Obolensky published the editio princeps. The text is the only complete list of the Chronicler and dates back to the second half of the 15th century.
- Nikiforov short manuscript: Later, a small excerpt of the Chronicler was found as part of the Nikiforov collection (from the collection of N. P. Nikiforov), dating from around the same time. According to the observations of Aleksey Shakhmatov, both lists go back to a common original.

== Contents ==
The LPS has two parts: a significantly abridged version of the Primary Chronicle (PVL) with many omissions, and a continuous narrative from 1137/8 to 1214 focused on events in Vladimir-Suzdal.

The Primary Chronicle (PVL) section of the LPS (l. 481 – l. 508ob; 55 pages instead of 286) is significantly abridged, and has numerous omissions and errors. The LPS beginning takes just 1.5 pages to get from Japheth (Afetov) to Kyi, Shchek and Khoryv and Lybid', where the main textual witnesses take 9 pages; similarly, the opening date of 6360 (852) on PVL page 17 line 25 is reached already on LPS page 5 (l. 483). The Nikiforov short manuscript breaks off at the entry for the year 907; the Archival long manuscript continues past 907. Some story lines (for example, the struggle with the Polovtsi) were skipped almost entirely. The ending of the PVL is most severely shortened: after 1051, the LPS only has entries on 1054, 1063, 1070, 1072–1075, 1086, 1089, and 1091; the entries for the years 1092–1107 are missing completely. After 1108 and 1110, the LPS rushes forward to the year 1137.

After the Primary Chronicle, the Chronicler of Pereyaslavl-Suzdal contains entries for the years 1137 and 1143, and then a continuous narrative of the events of 1138–1214. Beginning with the entry of 1138, the main attention of the Chronicler is concentrated on the Vladimir-Suzdal Principality. In this second part of the chronicle, as in the first, the compilation of material is selective. Almost exclusively, events mentioning either directly the great Vladimir-Suzdal princes or other representatives of the ruling Suzdalian clan, are included. The most fully preserved stories are about Yuri Dolgorukiy's struggle for Kiev (1149–1154), and about the war of succession of Yuri's sons and nephews for power in Suzdalia after the death of Andrey Bogolyubsky (1174–1176). After 1157, primarily events in the northeastern Rus' principalities are described, while the number of news records about events in Kievan Rus' in general sharply decreases.

- Primary Chronicle (PVL)
- Southern Rus' sources (similar to Kievan Chronicle)
- Suzdalian Chronicle
- Laurentian continuation of the Suzdalian Chronicle
- Radziwiłł Chronicle continuation of the Suzdalian Chronicle
- Sofia First Chronicle (S1L)
- Tver Codex of 1305
- lost leaves of surviving manuscripts

== Dating and place of writing ==
According to Mikhail Nikolaevich Berezhkov (Ukrainian: Mykhailo Mykolayovych Berezhkov; 1900), the LPS was created in the 15th century. According to A. A. Shakhmatov, the Vladimirian chronicle codex was created between 1216 and 1219.

Aleksander Sergeyevich Orlov (1871–1947) assumed that the LPS originated in western Kievan Rus'. Berezhkov was also inclined to the western Rus' origin of the first part of the chronicle. The basis for this assumption are the linguistic features of the text, as well as the fact that in the Archival collection before the Chronicler is placed the Chronograph of 1262, and in the Nikiforovsky collection it is followed by the Belarusian-Lithuanian Chronicle. However, the source contains virtually no information about the western principalities of Galicia (Halych) and Volhynia (Volyn'; in 1199 united as Galicia–Volhynia).

== Composition ==
Obolensky believed that the part of the collection preceding the Chronicler and the text itself go back to the Chronographic Codex of the 1360s. According to Shakhmatov, the Chronicler of Pereyaslavl-Suzdal and the preceding Letopisets vskore (lit. "Chronicler of soon") by Patriarch Nikephoros I of Constantinople represent an interpolation made by the compiler of the Archival Collection after the Chronograph of the Archival.

The LPS represents a compilation. Shakhmatov thought it was based on the Timeline of Great Tsars (Временник великих царств), a chronicle-chronographic compilation of the 14th century, the Kievan Chronicle (possibly the Vydubychi Monastery svod) and the Pereyaslavl Chronicle (entries of 1102, 1111, 1138–1214). The latter goes back to the Suzdalian Chronicle of the early 13th century.

Soviet historian A. N. Nasonov (1959) documented how the LPS shares this pattern of a post-1157 quasi-exclusive focus on Suzdalian events with the other three manuscripts of the Suzdalian Chronicle: the Laurentian Codex, the Radziwiłł Chronicle and the Academic Chronicle. According to Shakhmatov and Priselkov, in the part between 1132 and 1215, its content is very close to the Laurentian Codex, Trinity Chronicle (Troitskaya) and Tverian Chronicles, although Priselkov's 1950 "reconstruction" of the Trinity Chronicle after the 10th century was later widely disputed and rejected.

== Significance ==
The chronicler of Pereyaslavl Suzdal occupies a special place as a source on the history of the Vladimir-Suzdal war of succession of the sons of Vsevolod Yurievich "the Big Nest" in the years 1212–1213. The accounts of this period are remarkably detailed, and contain many significant details not found in other chronicles.

== Editions ==
- Mikhail Andreyevich Obolensky, Летописец русских царей ["Chronicler of Rus' tsars"]. In:' Супрасльская рукопись, содержащая Новгородскую и Киевскую сокращенные летописи ["Suprasl manuscript containing the Novgorodian and Kievan abridged chronicles"]. (1836) pp. 161–172. Moscow.
- Mikhail Andreyevich Obolensky (ed.), Летописец Переяславля Суздальского ["Chronicler of Pereyaslavl-Suzdal"]. In: Sequel to the Muscovite Society of History and Antiquities of Russia. — 1851. — Book 9. Chapter 2. (separate edition: Chronicler of Pereyaslavl-Suzdal, compiled in the early 13th century (between 1214–1219) / Ed. by M. Obolensky. — Мoscow, 1851.
- Русские летописи: I. Летописец патриарха Никифора. II. Летописец Переяславля Суздальского. III. Хроника русская (Летописец вкратце) ["Rus' Chronicles: I. Chronicler of Patriarch Nikephoros. II. Chronicler of Pereyaslavl-Suzdal. III. Rus' Chronicon (Brief chronicle) by Prof. Danilovich, Ignatiy Nikolaevich. Based on the manuscript attached to N. P. Nikiforov, with a preface by Sergey Belokurov. Readings in the Society of Russian History and Antiquities. — 1898. — Book 4. — С. V—IX, 7—17;
- Полное собрание русских летописей. Т. 41 : Летописец Переяславля Суздальского (Летописец русских царей) / Compiled by. S. N. Kisterev, Kloss, Boris Mikhailovich, L. A. Timoshina, I. A. Tikhonyuk. M. : Археографический центр (Archaeographic Centre), 1995. pp. 184. Electronic Library.
- Inkov, A. A., Летописец Переяславля Суздальского : предисловие, перевод, комментарий, ["Chronicler of Pereyaslavl Suzdal : foreword, translation, commentary"]. (2016), pp. 296. Moscow: Moscow University Publishing House, 2016. pp. 296.

== Literature ==
in Russian

- Lavrovsky, Pyotr Alekseevich, Замечательные слова из Переяславской летописи. — Известия по русскому языку и словесности Академии наук ["Remarkable words from the Pereyaslavl Chronicle. – Izvestiya po russkoi lazyka i slovessnosti Akademii nauki (Proceedings on Russian Language and Literature in Academic Research)"]. — 1854. — Vol. 3. — Leningrad. 8, 9, Additions, pp. 126–128.
- Milyutenko, Nadezhda Ilyinichna (1996). "Владимирский великокняжеский свод 1205 г. (Радзивиловская летопись) Vladimirskij velikoknjaieskij svod 1205 goda (Radzivilovskaja letopis')" [Vladimirian grand-princely svod of 1205 (Radziwiłł Chronicle)]. Труды Отдела древнерусской литературы Trudy Otdela drevnerusskoj literatury (in Russian). 49: 36–58.
- Nasonov, Α. N. (1959). "Об отношении летописания Переяславля Русского к киевскому (XII в.) Ob otnošenij letopisanija Perejaslavlja-Russkogo к Kievskomu (XII v.)" [On the relationship of the chronicle of Pereyaslavl-Russky to that of Kyiv (12th century)]. Проблемы источниковедения Problemy istočnikovedenija (in Russian). 8 (4): 466–494.
- Polenov, Dmitriy Vasilevich, Обозрение летописца Переяславского // Ученые записки II отделения Императорской Академии наук ["Review of the Chronicler of Pereyaslavl // Scientific Notes of the II Department of the Imperial Academy of Sciences"]. — 1854. — Book 1, Chapter III. pp. 59–98.
- Karsky, Evfimiy Fedorovich, К истории звуков и форм белорусской речи // РФВ. — 1892. — № 4. — С. 182—225 (о языке памятника);
- Berezhkov, Mikhail Nikolaevich, Еще несколько слов о Летописце Переяславля Суздальского // Сборник Историко-филологического общества при Институте кн. Безбородко в Нежине. Нежин, 1900. — Т. 3, отд. 3. — С. 59—86;
- Shakhmatov, Aleksey A., Обозрение русских Летописных Сводов XIV‒XVI вв. / Отв. ред.: А. С. Орлов, Б. Д. Греков. Институт литературы АН СССР. — Moscow; Leningrad : USSR Publishing House, 1938. — С. 44—68, 119—127, 304, 305.

in English

- Timberlake, Alan (2000). "Who Wrote the Laurentian Chronicle (1177–1203)?". Zeitschrift für Slavische Philologie. 59 (2). Universitätsverlag WINTER: 237–265.
