= Suzdalian Chronicle =

14th-century Rus' chronicle from Vladimir-Suzdal, covering 1111 to 1305

1177 begins the Suzdalian Chronicle in the strict sense. On folio 128 of the Laurentian Codex, the date "6685" (1177) can be seen in red ink in the bottom right-hand corner as В лѣт̑ . ҂s҃ . х҃ . п҃е ..

The Suzdalian Chronicle (Church Slavonic: Суздальскаѧ Лѣтопись, romanized: Suzdal'skaę Lětopys'; Russian: Суздальская летопись, romanized: Suzdal'skaia letopis'), also known as the Chronicle of Vladimir-Suzdal, Suzdal–Vladimirian Chronicle or Laurentian–Radziwiłł–Academic Chronicle (LRAC), is a Rus' chronicle. It is one of several continuations of the Primary Chronicle (PVL).

In the strictest sense of the term, Suzdalian Chronicle only means the segment between 1177 and 1203, the preserved source texts of which are very similar in four surviving manuscripts: the Laurentian Codex, the Radziwiłł Chronicle, the Academic Chronicle, and the Chronicler of Pereyaslavl-Suzdal (LPS). In its broadest sense, the Suzdalian Chronicle encompasses events from 1111 to 1305, as transmitted in the Laurentian Codex (the oldest surviving copy, dating from 1377, in columns 289–437). The chronicle is about the late period Kievan Rus', and the Laurentian continuation up to 1305 also includes events of its subsequent Rus' principalities under the early dominion of the Golden Horde. It has a pro-Yurievichi dynastic Tendenz, and a focus on the northeastern principalities of Vladimir-Suzdal, where it was compiled.

== Textual witnesses ==
The northeastern Rus' principalities of Vladimir-Suzdal and their neighbours after the Battle of Lipitsa (1216)

- The Radziwiłł Chronicle (or Königsberg Manuscript) provides a continuation up to the year 1206, based on records of the city of Vladimir on the Klyazma.
- The Academic Chronicle (or (Moscow) Academic Chronicle/Manuscript) contains text nearly identical to that of the Radziwiłł Chronicle up to 1206, then text nearly identical to that of the Sofia First Chronicle for the years 1205/1206–1238, and from 1238/1240 to 1418 it contains a Rostov chronicle collection, primarily concerned with events in and around Rostov.
- The Laurentian Codex provides a separate continuation up to the year 1305, based on a lost Tverian codex from 1305. The SVC copy found in the Laurentian Codex has six missing leaves: after folio 169, five leaves are missing about the events of 6771–6791 (1263–1283); after folio 170, one leaf is missing about the events of 6796–6802 (1288–1293). The number of lost leaves is estimated based on parallel texts from nearby chronicles; there is also a hypothesis that the last lacuna is associated not with the loss of a leaf, but with an omission in the protograph.
- The Chronicler of Pereyaslavl-Suzdal (LPS) is embedded in a 15th-century compilation. It starts from 1139 and continues up to 1214.
- Primary Chronicle (PVL)
- Southern Rus' sources (similar to Kievan Chronicle)
- Suzdalian Chronicle
- Laurentian continuation of the Suzdalian Chronicle
- Radziwiłł Chronicle continuation of the Suzdalian Chronicle
- Sofia First Chronicle (S1L)
- Tver Codex of 1305
- lost leaves of surviving manuscripts

== Contents ==
- In the Laurentian Codex, the Suzdal'–Vladimirian Chronicle comprises columns 289–437 (148 columns in total, starting from folio 96).
  - Columns 312–351 (40 columns in total) cover the protracted 1146–1162 succession struggle for the throne of Kiev.
    - Columns 323–326 cover the years 1149–1155 and focus on the efforts of Yuri Dolgorukiy (supported by Andrey Bogolyubsky) to claim and hold the Kievan throne.
    - In column 346, dated to 1155, Andrey removes the Icon of the Blessed Mother of God from Vyshhorod, and moves it to Vladimir.
  - Columns 351–352 narrate the 1164 fasting controversy in Suzdal.
  - Columns 354–355 narrate the Sack of Kiev (1169), which the Suzdal–Vladimirian Chronicle primarily justifies by reference to the 1164 fasting controversy in Suzdal.
  - Columns 367–369 contain the Short eulogy to Andrey Bogolyubsky. (The Long eulogy to Andrey Bogolyubsky is found in Kievan Chronicle columns 580–595).
  - Columns 409–411 narrate the devastating 1193 fire of Vladimir on the Klyazma, destroying much of the city. The Laurentian text adds a homily here, explaining the fire in terms of sin and the need to repent to God, ending with "Amen" (аминь). The whole homily of 1193 is missing in the Radziwiłł Chronicle and in the Chronicler of Perejaslavl-Suzdal (LPS); however, both do mention the word "Amen" at the end of their entry for 1185, which the Laurentian does not.

== Scholarly studies ==
=== Composition ===
A 1959 study by Soviet historian A.N. Nasonov documented how, until the year 1157, the contents of the Suzdalian Chronicle (as found in the Lav., Rad., Aka., and LPS manuscripts) are derivative of the Kievan Chronicle (as found in the Hypatian (Ipat.) and Khlebnikov (Khle.) manuscripts). Alan Timberlake (2000) commented: 'Nasonov 1959 documents that, in general, the Vladimir[-Suzdalian] tradition shares little with the Kievan tradition reflected in the Hypatian text after 1157. Nasonov also documents the fact that there is little shared language between the Vladimir tradition and the Hypatian text in these entries; he attributes these entries to а source in Perejaslavl'-Russkij.' 'After 1157, there are virtually no correspondences between the Laurentian [Suzdalian] and Hypatian [Kievan] texts, suggesting (although Nasonov stops short of saying this explicitly) that a new, autonomous tradition was initiated in the northeast.' Soviet historian Yakov Lur'e (1985) theorised about the common source of the Kievan and Suzdalian chronicles for the years 1118–1157: 'Probably, it was not a single document, but a whole group of interconnected southern Rus' svods (Kiev, Pereyaslavl'-Southern) in the 12th–13th centuries.'

The Laurentian Codex compiled several codices of the Vladimir chronicles. The Laurentian Codex was not just copied by the Nizhegorod monk Laurentius (commissioned in 1377, either by metropolitan Dionysius of Suzdal, or by prince Dmitry Konstantinovich of Novgorod-Suzdal). Some scholars think that the entire first section of the Chronicle of Vladimir-Suzdal until the year 1193 was written during the years 1177–1193.

Because the Laurentian homily of 1193 is missing from Radziwiłł and LPS, which do have an "Amen" in 1185 where Laurentian doesn't, early scholars such as Shakhmatov (1902, 1938), Priselkov (1940) and Prokhorov (1989) to conjecture that the "Vladimir" chronicle was compiled in several stages, with two or three possible redactions taking place in the mid-1170s, in 1185, and/or in 1193. Alan Timberlake (2000) tested these hypotheses linguistically, and found evidence of four distinct segments: 1177–1185a, 1185b–1188, 1189–1190, and 1192–1203. Although he was able to confirm redactional activity in 1185, he found other linguistic divisions that no previous scholar had proposed, and concluded there was no boundary in 1193, but instead a continuous narrative from 1192 to 1203. Laurentian, Radziwiłł and LPS 'are quite similar through 1203, at which point they diverge.'

The 1193–1212 part, which glorified Vsevolod, was composed in 1212 by his son Yuri II Vsevolodovich of Vladimir. The Vladimir chronicles borrowed from sources of the Southern Rus', especially from Pereiaslav, since Vladimir princes regarded the city as part of their patrimony.

The original text on events from 1284 to 1305 was a lost codex compiled for the Grand Prince Mikhail of Tver in 1305, but Laurentius re-edited the presentation of Yuri Vsevolodovich, the founder of Nizhny Novgorod, from positive into a negative, partly rehabilitating the role of Tatars. Vasily Komarovich (1976) studied traces of changes within the manuscript and established a hypothesis about differences between Laurentius' version and the lost one of the Tver chronicle.

=== Comparison with Kievan Chronicle ===
The text of the Suzdal'–Vladimirian Chronicle shows strong similarities with that of the Kievan Chronicle found in the Hypatian Codex, but also some remarkable differences. Jaroslaw Pekenski (1988) made the following comparison (italics by Pelenski):

| Kievan Chronicle | Suzdal'–Vladimirian Chronicle |
|---|---|
| The same year [1155] Prince Andrej went from his father from Vyšhorod to Suzdal' without his father's permission, and he took from Vyšhorod the Icon of the Blessed Mother of God which was brought from Cesarjagrad on the same ship with the Pirogošča [Icon]. And he had it framed in thirty-grivny-weight-of-gold, besides silver, and precious stones, and large pearls, and having thus adorned [the Icon], he placed it in his own church of the Mother of God in Vladimir. | The same year [1155] Prince Andrej went from his father to Suzdal', and he brought with him the Icon of the Blessed Mother of God which was brought from Cesarjagrad on the same ship with the Pirogošča [Icon]. And he had it framed in thirty-grivny-weight-of-gold, besides silver, and precious stones, and large pearls, and having thus adorned [the Icon], he placed it in his own church in Vladimir. |

Pelenski observed that the Kievan Chronicle framed Andrey's actions as improper and illegal, whereas the Suzdal'–Vladimirian Chronicle omitted any such references. This is in line with how the Kievan is generally ambivalent or openly critical of Andrey's reign, whilst the Suzdal'–Vladimirian is positive and complimentary of his actions.

Francis Butler (2012) remarked that the Legend of Gorislava of Polotsk sub anno 1128 is contained in the Suzdalian Chronicle, but not the Kievan Chronicle. Nevertheless, both are continuations of the Primary Chronicle, which mentions the related Legend of Rogned' of Polotsk sub anno 980.

== Bibliography ==
=== Translations ===
- "Laurentian Codex 1377" (in Church Slavic and Russian). National Library of Russia. 2012. [digitisation of the Laurentian Codex, including the Suzdal'–Vladimirian Chronicle, with a transcription of the Old Church Slavonic text and a translation into modern Russian, with an introduction in English]

=== Critical edition ===
- Лаврентьевская летопись [Laurentian Chronicle]. Полное Собрание Русских Литописей [Complete Collection of Rus' Chronicles]. Vol. 1. Leningrad: USSR Academy of Sciences Publishing House. 1926–1928.

=== Literature ===
- Butler, Francis (2012). "The "Legend of Gorislava" (not "Rogned'" or "Rogneda"): An Edition, Commentary, and Translation". Dubitando: Studies in History and Culture in Honor of Donald Ostrowski (PDF). Bloomington: Slavica Publishers. pp. 335–352. ISBN 9780893574048.
- Milyutenko, Nadezhda Ilyinichna (1996). "Владимирский великокняжеский свод 1205 г. (Радзивиловская летопись) Vladimirskij velikoknjaieskij svod 1205 goda (Radzivilovskaja letopis')" [Vladimirian grand-princely svod of 1205 (Radziwiłł Chronicle)]. Труды Отдела древнерусской литературы Trudy Otdela drevnerusskoj literatury (in Russian). 49: 36–58.
- Nasonov, Α. N. (1959). "Об отношении летописания Переяславля Русского к киевскому (XII в.) Ob otnošenij letopisanija Perejaslavlja-Russkogo к Kievskomu (XII v.)" [On the relationship of the chronicle of Pereyaslavl-Russky to that of Kyiv (12th century)]. Проблемы источниковедения Problemy istočnikovedenija (in Russian). 8 (4): 466–494.
- Pelenski, Jaroslaw (1988). "The Contest for the "Kievan Succession" (1155–1175): The Religious-Ecclesiastical Dimension". Harvard Ukrainian Studies. 12/13: 776. JSTOR 41036344.
- Pelenski, Jaroslaw (1987). "The Sack of Kiev of 1169: Its Significance for the Succession to Kievan Rus'". Harvard Ukrainian Studies. 11 (3). Harvard Ukrainian Research Institute: 303–316. JSTOR 41036277. Reprinted in Pelenski, The Contest for the Legacy of Kievan Rus'.
- Thuis, Hans (2015). Nestorkroniek. De oudste geschiedenis van het Kievse Rijk (in Dutch). Nijmegen: Uitgeverij Vantilt. p. 304. ISBN 9789460042287.
- Timberlake, Alan (2000). "Who Wrote the Laurentian Chronicle (1177–1203)?". Zeitschrift für Slavische Philologie. 59 (2). Universitätsverlag WINTER: 237–265.
