= Nestor the Chronicler =

Monk chronicler of Kievan Rus'

Saint Nestor the Chronicler
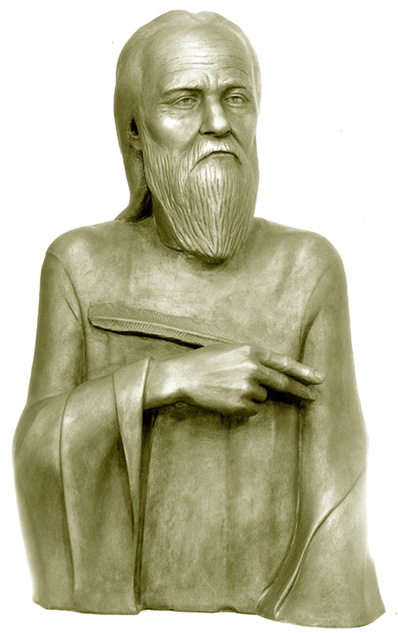
- Soviet forensic facial reconstruction by Sergei Nikitin (1985)

Venerable
- Born: c. 1056; Kiev
- Died: c. 1114; Kiev Pechersk Lavra
- Venerated in: Eastern Orthodox Church
- Feast: 27 October

Nestor the Chronicler (Note: Old East Slavic: Несторъ Лѣтописецъ, romanized: Nestorŭ Lětopisetsŭ; Church Slavonic: Нестор Летописец, romanized: Nestor Letopisec) (c. 1056 – c. 1114) was a monk of the Monastery of the Caves in Kiev and a prominent author in Kievan Rus'. He is firmly credited with writing two major hagiographies: the Life of the Venerable Theodosius of the Kiev Caves and the Account about the Life and Martyrdom of the Blessed Passion Bearers Boris and Gleb.

The Primary Chronicle (or Tale of Bygone Years) was traditionally attributed to Nestor, giving him the epithet "the Chronicler". However, most modern scholars doubt his authorship; as a result, some historians prefer to call him Nestor the Hagiographer.

== Biography ==
According to the Kiev Caves Patericon, Nestor entered the Monastery of the Caves in Kiev as a novice around 1073, when he was 17 years old. He received monastic tonsure under Stephen, the successor to Theodosius of Kiev, and was later ordained a hierodeacon.

In 1091, Nestor and two other monks were commissioned to locate the relics of Theodosius, which they successfully uncovered.

Nestor died around 1114 and was buried in the Near Caves. He was later canonized as a saint by the Eastern Orthodox Church. The body of St. Nestor is among the relics preserved in the Kiev Pechersk Lavra. He is commemorated with other saints of the Kiev Caves Lavra on September 28 (Synaxis of the Venerable Fathers of the Kiev Caves) and on the Second Sunday of Great Lent, and his feast day is celebrated on October 27.

== Purported authorship of the Primary Chronicle ==
The Chronicle was long regarded as the first compilation of the work of a monk named Nestor (c. 1056 – c. 1114), who was also known to have written the Life of the Venerable Theodosius. Writers of the time spoke of the Chronicle of Nestor, and of the author as Nestor "the Chronicler." Based on the 1661 Paterik of the Kiev Monastery of the Caves, late 17th-century writers began to assert that Nestor "the Chronicler" wrote many of the surviving Rus' chronicles, including the Primary Chronicle, the Kievan Chronicle and the Galician–Volhynian Chronicle, even though many of the events they described took place in the 12th and 13th century, long after Nestor's death c. 1114. Another reason given for belief in Nestorian authorship was the word "нестера" in the opening lines of the Khlebnikov Codex (discovered in 1809), which some readers took to refer to Nestor "the Chronicler". According to Donald Ostrowski: "The word нестера was added in the Khlebnikov Codex, and thus cannot be used as evidence for the name of the compiler of the PVL." The word is not found in any of the other five main versions of the Primary Chronicle, (Note: The often careless Vasily Tatishchev (1686–1750) claimed that three Chronicle texts that were somehow "lost" later also identified "Nestor" as the author. Modern scholars distrust all such "Tatishchev information" unless they are supported by another extant source.) and is thus an interpolation inserted into the text by an editor, perhaps guessing at the author's name. From the 1830s to around 1900, there was fierce academic debate about Nestor's authorship, but the question remains unresolved, and belief in Nestorian authorship persists. The internal evidence of the Primary Chronicle and the known works of Nestor often contradict one another, while the contents barely coincide in places where they seemingly should, so modern scholars have concluded that Nestor was not the author. (Note: 'In any case, the internal evidence of the Povest', along with the lack of coincidence of its contents with Nestor's works wherever the two are related, is distinctly opposed to the tradition of Nestorian authorship.')

A more likely candidate for the author of the Chronicle is Sylvester of Kiev, the hegumen (abbot) of the St. Michael's Monastery in Vydubychi, situated near Kiev, who may have compiled several sources in the year 1116. This attribution is based on the fact that the Laurentian text ends on page 286, lines 1 to 7, with the colophon "I wrote down (napisakh) this chronicle", (Note: Church Slavonic: Игуменъ силивестръ стаг михаила· написах книгы си лѣтописець·, romanized: Igumenʺ silivestrʺ stag mikhaila· napisakh knigy si lětopisecʹ·, lit. 'Abbot Silivestr" of St. Michael's Abbey – I wrote this chronicle [lit. "book of year writings"].') after which he requests the readers to remember him in their prayers. Alternately, the real author may have been some other unnamed monk from the Kiev Monastery of the Caves mentioned in the title, and Sylvester completed his work, or was a very early editor or copyist of the Primary Chronicle.

== Veneration ==
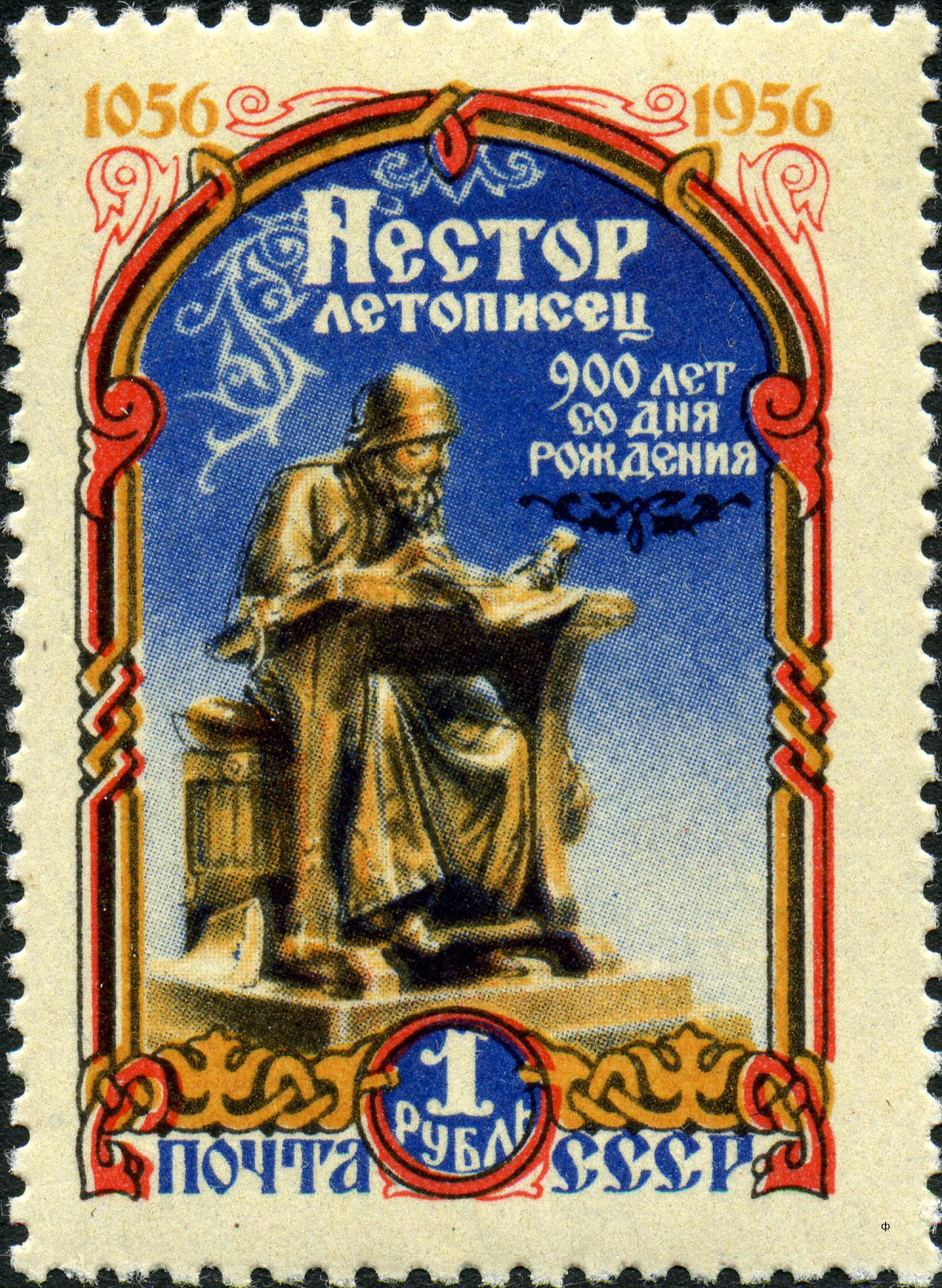
Nestor commemorated on a 1956 Soviet stamp

Nestor the Chronicler was canonized by including his name in the Synaxis of all Venerable Fathers of the Kiev Caves.

=== Feast day ===
- 27 October – main commemoration (with Nestor of Thessaloniki and Nestor of the Far Kiev Caves)

=== Fixed Feast Day (Synaxes) ===
- 25 May – Synaxis of Saints of Volhynia (Russian Orthodox Church Outside of Russia and Greek Orthodox Church)
- 15 July – Synaxis of All Saints of Kiev (Russian Orthodox Church - ROC)
- 28 September – Synaxis of the Venerable Fathers of the Kiev Near Caves
- 10 October – Synaxis of Saints of Volhynia (ROC)
- 27 October – Synaxis of All Saints of Kiev Theological Academy and Kiev Theological Seminary [Ukrainian Orthodox Church (Moscow Patriarchate)]

=== Moveable Feast Day (Synaxes) ===
- Synaxis of all Venerable Fathers of the Kiev Caves – movable holiday on the 2nd Sunday of the Great Lent
- Synaxis of the Saints of the Kievan Caves Monastery, venerated in the near caves of Venerable Anthony – movable holiday on the 1st Saturday after Leavetaking of the Elevation of the Cross (21 September)

== Liturgical hymns ==
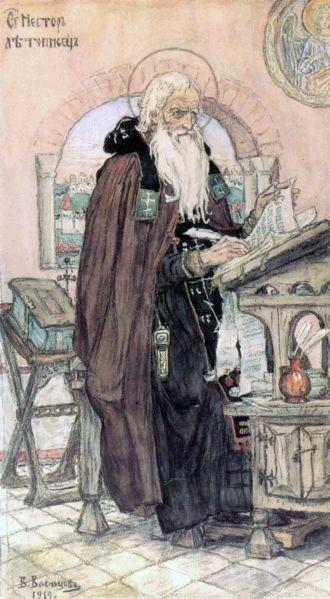
Depiction of Nestor the Chronicler by Viktor Vasnetsov, 1919

Liturgical hymns dedicated to Saint Nestor are preserved in the Eastern Orthodox tradition.

Troparion St. Nestor — Tone 4

Вели́ких князе́й ру́сских дея́ния/ и преподо́бных оте́ц Пече́рских жития́ и чудеса́ написа́вый,/ свое́ же, Богому́дре Не́сторе, мно́гих ти ра́ди доброде́телей и́мя/ напи́сано на Небеси́ стяжа́вый,// моли́ и нам написа́тися в Кни́ги Живо́тныя.

Velikikh knyazey russkikh deyaniya/ i prepodobnykh otets Pecherskikh zhitiya i chudesa napisavy,/ svoe zhe, Bogomudre Nestore, mnogikh ti radi dobrodeteley imya/ napisano na Nebesi styazhavy,// moli i nam napisatisya v Knigi Zhivotnyya.

Common Troparion St. Nestor — Tone 4

Времена́ и ле́та достопа́мятных дея́ний,/ по́двиги и труды́ Богоно́сных оте́ц,/ Не́сторе прему́дре, напису́я,/ любо́вию возгоре́лся еси́ после́довати стопа́м первонача́льных,/ с ни́миже не преста́й моли́тися Христу́ Бо́гу,// спасти́ся душа́м на́шим.

Vremena i leta dostopamyatnykh deyany,/ podvigi i trudy Bogonosnykh otets,/ Nestore premudre, napisuya,/ lyuboviyu vozgorelsya esi posledovati stopam pervonachalnykh,/ s nimizhe ne prestay molitisya Khristu Bogu,// spastisya dusham nashim.

Kontakion St. Nestor — Tone 2

Я́ко сый Богоно́снаго Феодо́сия учени́к/ и и́стинный жития́ того́ подража́тель,/ пе́рвый честны́х его́ моще́й самови́дец бы́ти сподо́бился еси́,/ я́же с про́чиими святоле́пно прене́с,/ насле́дил еси́ с те́миже Ца́рство Небе́сное,// е́же получи́ти и нам, чту́щим тя, Го́сподеви моли́ся.

Yako siy Bogonosnago Feodosiya uchenik/ i istinny zhitiya togo podrazhatel,/ pervy chestnykh ego moshchey samovidets byti spodobilsya esi,/ yazhe s prochiimi svyatolepno prenes,/ nasledil esi s temizhe Tsarstvo Nebesnoe,// ezhe poluchiti i nam, chtushchim tya, Gospodevi molisya.

== Known works ==
- Life of the Venerable Theodosius of the Kiev Caves (1080s)
- Chtenie ("Reading", "Lesson", "Legend", "Account") about the Life and Martyrdom of the Blessed Passion Bearers Boris and Gleb (late 11th or early 12th century; dating heavily disputed).
  - Abramovych, Dmytro, ed. (1916). "Чтение о Святых Мучениках Борисе и Глебе Chtenie o Svjatykh Muchenykakh Borise i Glebe" [Reading about the Holy Martyrs Boris and Gleb]. Жития святых мучеников Бориса и Глеба, и службы им Zhitija svjatykh muchenikov Borisa i Gleba, i sluzhby im [Lives of the holy martyrs Boris and Gleb, and services to them] (in Russian). Azbuka. (based on the oldest manuscript, the 14th-century Silvestrovskij sbornik)
  - Hollingsworth, Paul (1992). "Lesson on the life of Boris and Glěb". The Hagiography of Kievan Rusʹ. Boston: Harvard Ukrainian Research Institute. pp. 3–32. ISBN 978-0-916458-28-7.
- (disputed) Primary Chronicle, or The Tale of Bygone Years (ca. 1113)

== Bibliography ==
- "Нестор, летописец" . Brockhaus and Efron Encyclopedic Dictionary (in Russian). 1906.
- Cross, Samuel Hazzard; Sherbowitz-Wetzor, Olgerd P. (1953). The Russian Primary Chronicle, Laurentian Text. Translated and edited by Samuel Hazzard Cross and Olgerd P. Sherbowitz-Wetzor (PDF). Cambridge, Massachusetts: The Mediaeval Academy of America. p. 325. (First edition published in 1930. The first 50 pages are a scholarly introduction.)
- Maiorov, Alexander V. (November 2018). ""I Would Sacrifice Myself for my Academy and its Glory!" August Ludwig von Schlözer and the Discovery of the Hypatian Chronicle". Russian History. 45 (4). Brill: 319–340. doi:10.1163/18763316-04504002. JSTOR 27072372.
- Ostrowski, Donald (March 1981). "Textual Criticism and the Povest' vremennykh let: Some Theoretical Considerations". Harvard Ukrainian Studies. 5 (1). Harvard Ukrainian Research Institute: 11–31. JSTOR 41035890.
- Ostrowski, Donald, ed. (2003). The Povest' vremennykh let: An Interlinear Collation and Paradosis. 3 volumes (in Russian and English). Cambridge, MA: Harvard University Press. Archived from the original on 2005-03-09. (assoc. ed. David J. Birnbaum, Harvard Library of Early Ukrainian Literature, vol. 10, parts 1–3) – This 2003 Ostrowski et al. edition includes an interlinear collation including the five main manuscript witnesses, as well as a new paradosis ("a proposed best reading").
  - Ostrowski, Donald; Birnbaum, David J. (7 December 2014). "Rus' primary chronicle critical edition – Interlinear line-level collation". pvl.obdurodon.org (in Church Slavic). Archived from the original on 28 April 2025. – A 2014 improved digitised version of the 2002/2003 Ostrowski et al. edition.
- Ostrowski, Donald (2018). "Was There a Riurikid Dynasty in Early Rus'?". Canadian-American Slavic Studies. 52 (1): 30–49. doi:10.1163/22102396-05201009.
- Plokhy, Serhii (2006). The Origins of the Slavic Nations: Premodern Identities in Russia, Ukraine, and Belarus (PDF). New York: Cambridge University Press. pp. 10–15. ISBN 978-0-521-86403-9. Archived (PDF) from the original on 6 June 2011.
- Tolochko, Oleksiy (2005). "История Российская" Василия Татищева: источники и известия "Istoriia Rossiiskaia" Vasiliia Tatishcheva: istochniki i izvestiia [Vasily Tatishchev's "History of Russia": Sources and Information]. Moscow: Новое литературное обозрение Novoe literaturnoe obozrenie. p. 543.
- Tolochko, Oleksiy (2007). "On "Nestor the Chronicler"". Harvard Ukrainian Studies. 29 (1). Harvard University: 31–59. JSTOR 41304501.
