= Sylvestr =

Sylvestr is a given name and surname, a Slavic form of Sylvester. Notable people with the name include:

- Jakub Sylvestr (born 1989), Slovak football player
- Sylvester of Kiev (c. 1055–1123), clergyman and writer in Kievan Rus
