= Academic Chronicle =

15th-century compilation of Rus' chronicles

Opening lines of the Primary Chronicle (PVL) in the Moscow Academic copy (click for full PDF)

The Academic Chronicle or Moscow Academic Chronicle (Russian: Московско-Академическая летопись, romanized: Moskovskaya akademicheskaya letopis'), sometimes also known as Suzdal' Chronicle (Russian: Суздальская летопись, romanized: Suzdal'skaya letopis') (Note: The 15th-century Suzdal' Chronicle should not be confused with the 14th-century Suzdalian Chronicle, which covers events from 1111 to 1305 and which survives through the copy in the 1377 Laurentian Codex.) is a late 15th-century compilation of Rus' chronicles. The chronicle was probably compiled in Rostov based on the Primary Chronicle (PVL), Radziwiłł Chronicle (events before 1206), Sofia First Chronicle (events 1205–1238), and a Rostov collection (events 1238–1418). The chronicle was published in full in the Complete Collection of Russian Chronicles in 1927. The only surviving original was for some time kept in the Moscow Theological Academy (which gave rise to its name "(Moscow) Academic Chronicle"), and is currently preserved in the Russian State Library (manuscript ID: Ф.173/I №236). It is an important source for the history of Kievan Rus' and late medieval Russia, which in the early 21st century was being discussed for its importance for early Russian literature.

== Contents ==
Contents:

- Primary Chronicle (c. 850 – 1110s)
- Radziwiłł Chronicle (1110s – 1206)
- Sofia First Chronicle (only the years 1206 – 1237)
- Rostov collection (1238 – 1418)
- Primary Chronicle (PVL)
- Southern Rus' sources / Kievan Chronicle
- Suzdalian Chronicle
- Laurentian continuation of the Suzdalian Chronicle
- Radziwiłł Chronicle continuation of the Suzdalian Chronicle
- Galician–Volhynian Chronicle
- Sofia First Chronicle
- Tver Codex of 1305
- lost leaves of surviving manuscripts
