= Inés García de la Puente =

Spanish-born U.S. historian of Kievan Rus'

Inés García de la Puente is a Spanish-born American medievalist specialising in the East Slavic Middle Ages and Translation Studies. She is a research assistant professor of Russian and Comparative Literature at Boston University, and an expert in the history and culture of Kievan Rus', particularly the role of women in the ruling elite and trade routes, as well as camels in pre-Mongol Kiev.

== Biography ==
Inés García de la Puente obtained her PhD at the Complutense University of Madrid. She has lived, taught and researched for extended periods of time in Russia, Poland, Germany, Switzerland and France. As of 2010, she was working in the United States as a post-doctoral researcher at Harvard University on trade routes in early Kievan Rus'. By 2017, she worked at Boston University and Ohio State University.

In 2019, she completed the first translation of the Primary Chronicle (Tale of Bygone Years, PVL) into modern Spanish under the title Relato de los años pasados. Susana Torres Prieto wrote a positive review, saying that unlike the previous 2013 Spanish translation by A.L. Encinas Moral, Garcia's edition was "updated and fully in line with the findings of our colleagues on both sides of the Atlantic Ocean." In particular, Torres praised the concise yet insightful, up-to-date scholarly introduction: "Only someone extremely familiar with the text and its background would be capable of such a synthesis." Taking the critical edition of the PVL by Donald Ostrowski et al. (2003, 2014) as the basis of her literal translation, she sometimes gives motivated explanations for opting a divergent reading, or freer translation when the Slavonic original is incomprehensible, complete with a critical apparatus and justifications for all relevant editorial decisions. Yet, Torres was rather critical of the further structure of the translation, with long footnotes but no index, leaving her wondering who the intended audience was, and that Garcia's otherwise excellent translation deserved a better publisher's approach.

== Works ==
=== Monographs ===
- García de la Puente, Inés (2019). Relato de los años pasados. Edición preparada por Inés García de la Puente (in Spanish). Madrid: Biblioteca de Autores Cristianos. p. 296. ISBN 978-8422020721. (modern Spanish translation of the Primary Chronicle).

=== Book chapters (selection) ===
- García de la Puente, Inés (2017b). "The Widow Princess of Minsk". Portraits of Medieval Eastern Europe, 900–1400. Routledge. pp. 15–22. doi:10.4324/9781315204178-2. ISBN 978-1-315-20417-8. Ed. by D. Ostrowski and C. Raffensperger
- García de la Puente, Inés (5 January 2022). "Imagined Geographies in Early Rus'". Authorship, Worldview, and Identity in Medieval Europe. London: Routledge. pp. 141–163. doi:10.4324/9781003025160-7. ISBN 978-1-003-02516-0.
- García de la Puente, Inés (2012). "Archaeological Finds of Camels in Pre-Mongol Rus': A Reassessment". In Boeck, Brian J.; Martin, Russell E.; Rowland, Daniel (eds.). Dubitando: Studies in History and Culture in Honor of Donald Ostrowski. Cambridge University Press. pp. 53–60. ISBN 978-0-8-9357-404-8.

=== Journal articles (selection) ===
- García De La Puente, Inés (1 December 2006). "Single Combats in the PVL. An Indo-European Comparative Analysis". Studi Slavistici: 19–30. doi:10.13128/STUDI_SLAVIS-2143.
- Inés García de la Puente, "Beyond the Sea: On the Use of за море in the Primary Chronicle". Ruthenica. 16. 28–36. 2022.
- García de la Puente, Inés (2010). "What Route Does the Povest' vremennykh let Really Describe?". The Russian Review. 69 (3). Wiley: 373–387. doi:10.1111/j.1467-9434.2010.00572.x. ISSN 0036-0341. JSTOR 25677245.
- Garcia de la Puente, Ines (2012). "Gleb of Minsk's Widow: Neglected Evidence on the Rule of a Woman in Rus'ian History?". Russian History. 39 (3). Brill Deutschland: 347–378. doi:10.1163/18763316-03903006. ISSN 0094-288X.
- García de la Puente, Inés (2017a). "Autotraducción y movimiento : ¿rumbo al sur, deseando el norte?" [Self-translation and movement: Travelling south, wishing for the north?]. Revista Iberoamericana (in Spanish). 83 (258): 103–118. doi:10.5195/reviberoamer.2017.7453. ISSN 0034-9631.

== Bibliography ==
- Gruber, Isaiah (2013). "(Review) Dubitando: Studies in Culture in Honor of Donald Ostrowski". The Russian Review. 72 (3). Wiley: 505–509. ISSN 0036-0341. JSTOR 43661878.
- "Ines Garcia de la Puente". Harvard Ukrainian Research Institute.
