= Khlebnikov Codex =

16th-century codex of Rus' chronicle

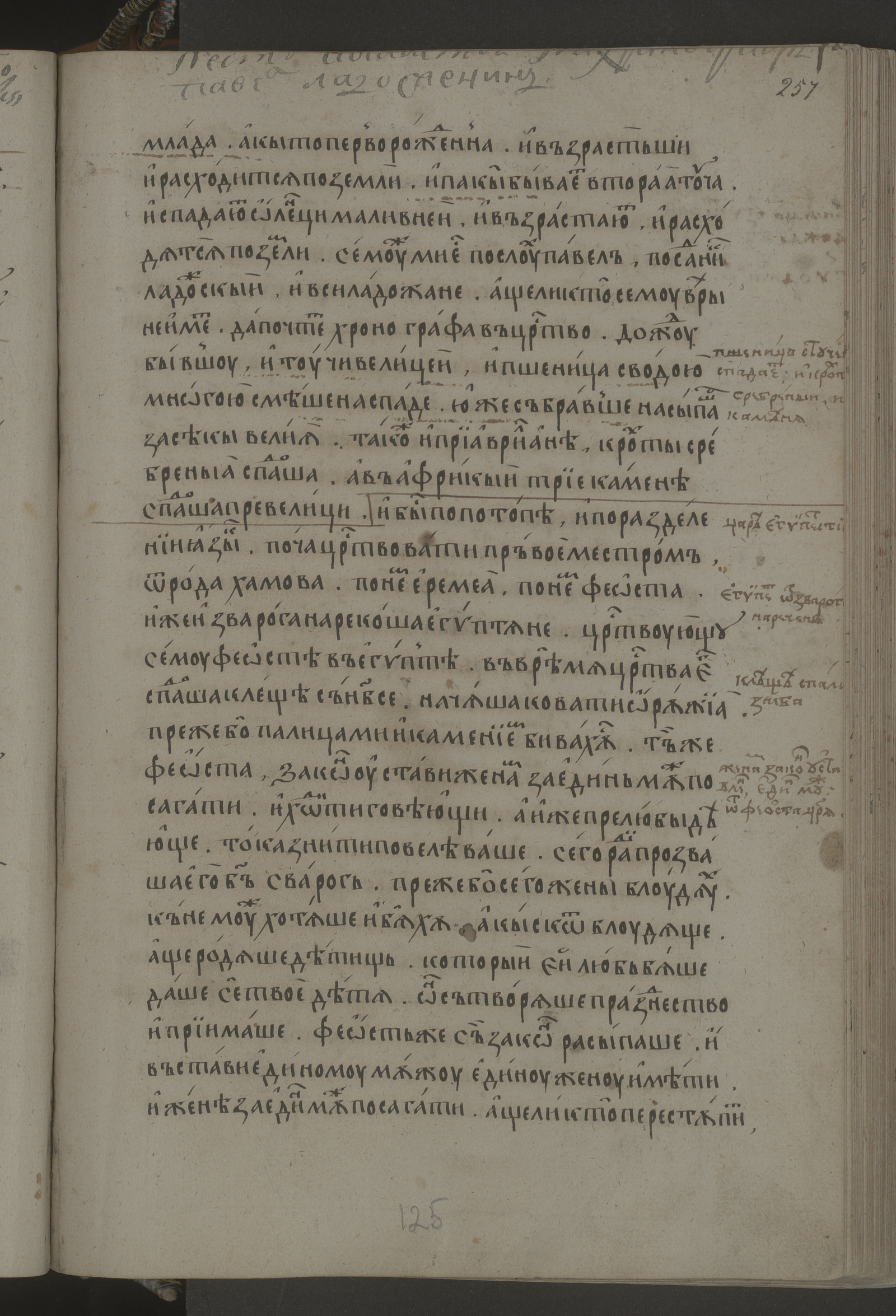
Khlebnikov Codex page 257, which sub anno 6622 (1114) mentions Slavic pagan gods Svarog and Dazhbog

The Khlebnikov Codex (Ukrainian: Хлєбниковський список, romanized: Khljebnykovsʹkyj spysok; Russian: Хлебниковский список, romanized: Khlebnikovskiy spisok) is a codex of Rus' chronicles compiled in the 1560s.

== Provenance and physical description ==
The Khlebnikov Codex was unexpectedly discovered in the summer of 1809. It is named after one of its previous owners, Pyotr Khlebnikov (Russian: Пётр Хлебников), a merchant from Kolomna, Russia. The codex is currently preserved in the National Library of Russia with registration number "F.IV.230".

The fully scanned Khlebnikov Codex (click to open PDF)

Boris Kloss (2007) concluded that the entire text was copied by the same scribes. He identified the filigree – variants of a wild boar – with the no. 3661 type dated to 1560 by Edmund Laucevičius (1967), leading Kloss to the conclusion that 'the main part of the manuscript was written in the 1560s'. Aleksey Shakhmatov (1908) identified the text's language as "southern Rus', with very typical local features". Several notes on the final folio's verso confirm the southwestern provenance; one note mentions a certain "logothete Vitolt Maroc of the Moldavian land". This "Vitolt Maroc" (Romanian: Vitold Mărățeanul) was identified as the codex' owner, but the next note says Vitold the logothete "stole" this book from "father governor of Ustia" in the town of "Krosnyk". Oleksiy Tolochko (2007) reported that Vitold Maroc served under Constantin Movilă, hospodar (prince) of Moldavia (r. 1607–1611), his brother Jeremiah, Jeremiah's widow in 1615, and Constantin's widow Domna, who lived in Ustia.

The Khlebnikov Codex or a closely related copy may have been present or known in the city of Kiev in the early 1620s, because marginalia in chapter four of Palinodia (1621), which may or may not have been added by author Zacharias Kopystensky himself, mentions a "chronicle of Nestor". Although the word нестера ("of Nestor"?) in the opening lines of the Khlebnikov Codex is known to be a later interpolation because it is not found in any of the other five main textual versions of the Primary Chronicle (PVL), and therefore is not evidence of Nestorian authorship, the Khlebnikov Codex is the oldest-known extant manuscript to claim that a person named "Nestor" wrote it. Therefore, it is possible that the note in Palinodia refers to the Khlebnikov PVL copy or a closely related copy that Kopystensky or a later reader of his work was familiar with.

Several pages from the original Khlebnikov Codex were lost in the 17th century, and a couple of other pages were inserted out of order. To make up for the lost pages, new pages were copied from a different Hypatian-type text, namely folios 130, 131, 182, 224, 225, 332, and 333 (with a filigree dating to 1641–1646); the new folio 182 was unnecessarily copied, because the original was not lost, but reinserted in the wrong place as folio 186. Shakhmatov discovered that corrections in vermilion ink in the first few pages of the Khlebnikov Codex were based on one of the Tver Compilation copies; Kloss analysed that these corrections could not have been made earlier than the 1640s.

Kloss further observed that the bookbinding must have taken place in the late 1750s, as the binding paper has a 1756 filigree of the coat of arms of Yaroslavl, the inserted pages carry the watermark of the Mosolov paper factory from the 1750s, and there are 'many notes in black ink concerning the year 1756, partly cut off near the binding. Therefore the binding must have been done soon after the year 1756.'

== Contents ==
=== Regnal list of Kiev ===
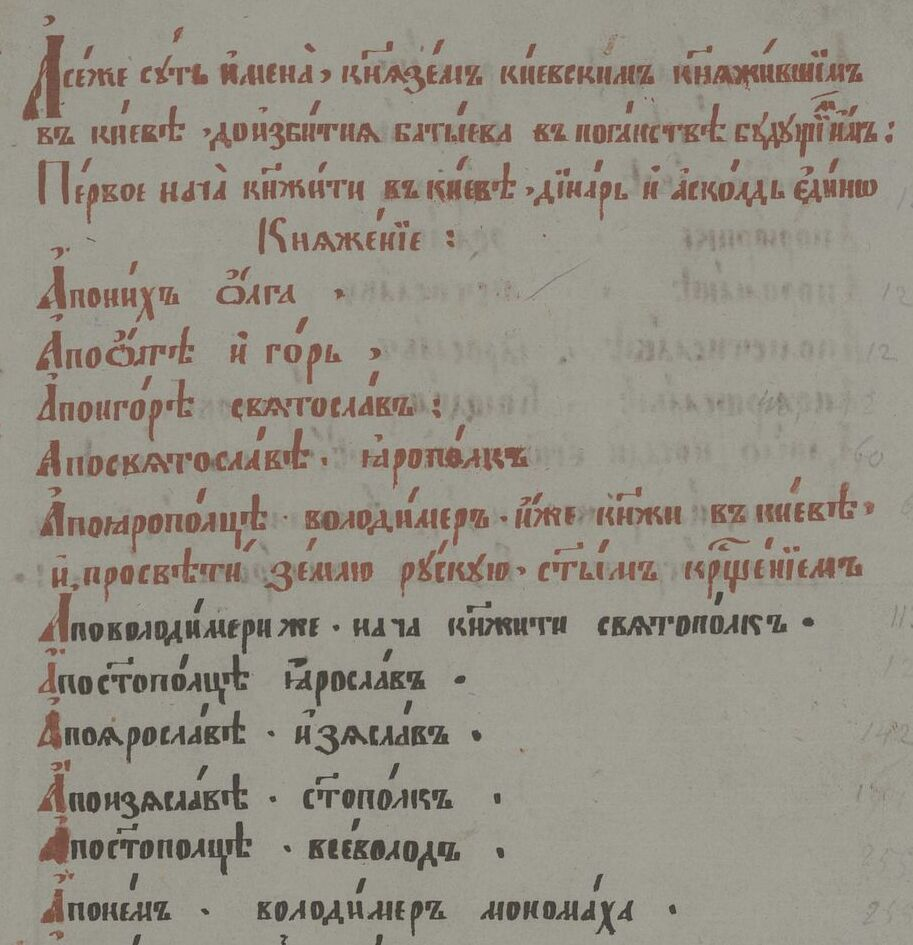
'In Kiev, the first to begin reigning together were Dinar and Askold, after them came Olga, after Olga Igor...'

The first two pages of the Khlebnikov Codex contain a regnal list of grand princes of Kiev: 'Herein are the first names of the Kievan great princes ruling the Kievan great princes ruling in Kiev up until its conquest by Batyja's people living in heathenism. In Kiev, the first to begin reigning together were Dinar and Askold, after them came Olga, after Olga Igor, after Igor Sviatoslav, (...)'. There is no mention of a "Rurik"; instead, the list starts with "Dinar and Askold", better known as Askold and Dir, very similar to the Hypatian Codex's beginning. Unlike Hypatian's second place for Oleg the Wise, however, Khlebnikov appears to assert Olga of Kiev succeeded them, and preceded her own husband Igor of Kiev.

=== Primary Chronicle copy ===
The first part of the codex contains the Khlebnikov manuscript (also spelt Xlebnikov, abbreviated Xle, X, Х, or Kh) which is one of the six main manuscripts preserving the Primary Chronicle (PVL) which scholars study for the purpose of textual criticism. The Khlebnikov text of the PVL is closely related to the older Hypatian Codex (c. 1425), with whom it shares a common ancestor. But during the process of transmission, Khlebnikov has been "contaminated" by a Radziwiłł/Academic-type copy. Gippius (2014) considered the Hypatian/Khlebnikov copies to represent the "southern, Kievan branch" of the PVL, as opposed to the other four (Laurentian, Trinity, Radziwiłł, Academic) being of the "Vladimir-Suzdal branch".

=== Kievan Chronicle copy ===
The second part of the Khlebnikov Codex contains a copy of the Kievan Chronicle, ending with an entry for the year 6704 (1196), unlike in the Hypatian Codex (Ipatiev), which ends its narrative in the year 6706 (1198).

=== Galician–Volhynian Chronicle copy ===
The Khlebnikov Codex' third part contains a copy of the Galician–Volhynian Chronicle (GVC), for which it is considered a more reliable source text than the textual witness found in the Hypatian Codex. While the 1843, 1908 and 1962 editions of the GVC published in the Complete Collection of Russian Chronicles (PSRL) and the 1871 Archaeographical Commission edition were still primarily based on the Hypatian text and only included Khlebnikov for variant readings, A. Klevanov's 1871 Russian paraphrase was the first work to take the Khlebnikov text as the foundation for reconstructing the GVC.

== Bibliography ==
=== Primary sources ===
- Ostrowski, Donald; Birnbaum, David J. (7 December 2014). "Rus' primary chronicle critical edition – Interlinear line-level collation". pvl.obdurodon.org (in Church Slavic). Archived from the original on 28 April 2025.

=== Literature ===
- Gippius, Alexey A. (2014). "Reconstructing the original of the Povesť vremennyx let: a contribution to the debate". Russian Linguistics. 38 (3). Springer: 341–366. doi:10.1007/s11185-014-9137-y. JSTOR 43945126. S2CID 255017212.
- Jusupović, Adrian (2022). The Chronicle of Halych-Volhynia and Historical Collections in Medieval Rus'. Leiden: Brill. p. 268. ISBN 9789004509306.
- Kloss, Boris (1998). "Predislovie k izdaniyu 1998 g." Предисловие к изданию 1998 г. [Foreword to the 1998 Edition]. Ipat'evskaya letopis' Ипатьевская летопись [The Hypatian Codex]. Complete Collection of Russian Chronicles (PSRL) (in Church Slavic and Russian). Vol. 2 (5th ed.). Moscow: Yazyki russkoy kul'tury / Izbornyk. pp. E–N.
- Kloss, Boris (2007). "Copies of the Hypatian Chronicle and Their Textology". Harvard Ukrainian Studies. 29 (1). Translated by DiMauro, Giorgio. Harvard Ukrainian Research Institute: 129–147. JSTOR 41304504.
- Lunt, Horace G. (June 1994). "Lexical Variation in the Copies of the Rus' "Primary Chronicle": Some Methodological Problems". Ukrainian Philology and Linguistics. 18 (1–2). Harvard Ukrainian Research Institute: 10–28. JSTOR 41036551.
- Maiorov, Alexander V. (November 2018). ""I Would Sacrifice Myself for my Academy and its Glory!" August Ludwig von Schlözer and the Discovery of the Hypatian Chronicle". Russian History. 45 (4). Brill: 319–340. doi:10.1163/18763316-04504002. JSTOR 27072372. S2CID 191820897.
- Ostrowski, Donald (March 1981). "Textual Criticism and the Povest' vremennykh let: Some Theoretical Considerations". Harvard Ukrainian Studies. 5 (1). Harvard Ukrainian Research Institute: 11–31. JSTOR 41035890.
- Ostrowski, Donald (2018). "Was There a Riurikid Dynasty in Early Rus'?". Canadian-American Slavic Studies. 52 (1): 30–49. doi:10.1163/22102396-05201009.
- Perfecky, George A. (1973). The Hypatian Codex Part Two: The Galician–Volynian Chronicle. An annotated translation by George A. Perfecky. Munich: Wilhelm Fink Verlag. OCLC 902306.
- Pritsak, Omeljan, ed. (1991). The Old Rus' Kievan and Galician–Volhynian Chronicles: The Ostroz'kyj (Xlebnikov) and Cetvertyns'kyj (Pogodin) Codices. Harvard Library of Early Ukrainian Literature. Texts: Volume VIII. Cambridge, Massachusetts: Harvard University Press. p. 761. ISBN 9780916458379.
- Tolochko, Oleksiy (2007). "On "Nestor the Chronicler"". Harvard Ukrainian Studies. 29 (1). Harvard University: 31–59. JSTOR 41304501.
