= Hypatian Codex =

Manuscript

Primary Chronicle beginning in the Hypatian Codex (click for full PDF)

The Hypatian Codex, also known as Hypatian Letopis or Ipatiev Letopis, (Note: Belarusian: Іпацьеўскі летапіс, romanized: Ipac'yewski letapis; Russian: Ипатьевская летопись, romanized: Ipat'yevskaya letopis; Ukrainian: Іпатіївський літопис, romanized: Ipatiivskyj litopys, IPA: [iˈpɑt⁽ʲ⁾ijiu̯sʲkɪj l⁽ʲ⁾iˈtɔpɪs].) is a compendium of three Rus' chronicles: the Primary Chronicle, Kievan Chronicle and Galician–Volhynian Chronicle. It is the most important source of historical data about Kievan Rus'. The language of this work is Old Church Slavonic with many East Slavisms.

== Provenance ==
The codex was discovered in Ukraine in 1617 by Zacharias Kopystensky, and was then copied by monks in 1621.

The codex later known as the Hypatian Codex was most likely acquired from the Ipatiev Monastery (Hypatian Monastery) in Kostroma on 15 May 1767. This would have happened during the May–June 1767 Volga voyage of Empress Catherine II (r. 1762–1796), who was highly interested in reading Rus' chronicles, and collecting them all at the capital city of Saint Petersburg (one of the goals of her voyage). Count Vladimir Grigorievich Orlov (1743–1831), then director of the Academy of Sciences, accompanied the empress on the voyage and wrote in his diary that three chronicles were acquired from the Ipatievsky Monastery on 15 May 1767, which were subsequently sent to Moscow and ended up in the Petersburg Library of the Russian Academy of Sciences. Ever since, the Hypatian Codex has been preserved there with registration number "16.4.4".

According to the Istoriia Biblioteki Akademii Nauk SSSR, the Hypatian manuscript was first mentioned in S. S. Bashilov's October 1767 letter to August Ludwig von Schlözer (Catherine had previously appointed Schlözer as full professor of Academy of Sciences on 3 January 1765 with a 5-year contract). At some point after Schlözer left Saint Petersburg on 15 June 1765 (to organise education of Russian history students at the University of Göttingen), but before autumn 1767, the Library of the Russian Academy of Sciences must have acquired it. Schlözer returned to Saint Petersburg in autumn 1766 one last time before settling in Göttingen definitively. Before leaving, he gave instructions to Bashilov, who was dissatisfied with his humble position at the Academy, unable to do and get credit for his own work.

In the letter of 12 October 1767, Bashilov wrote that the codex had been delivered from the Ipatievsky Monastery to the Committee of the Academy of Sciences, where Alexei Yakovlevich Polenov (1738–1816) was given the task of describing and copying the Hypatian Codex in order to prepare it for publication. In response to Schlözer's request for more information on the codex, Bashilov provided more details, leading the excited Schlözer to write An Abstract from a Report from St. Petersburg dated 16 (27) December 1767, which Johann Christoph Gatterer (1727–1799) included in his 1768 book published in Göttingen.

== History of studies ==
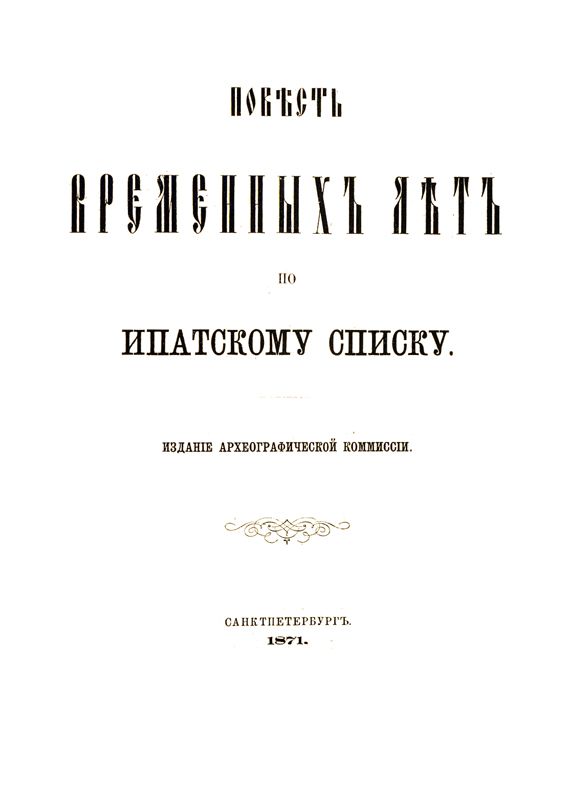
Hypatian Codex critical edition 1871

Because Schlözer was working in Göttingen and could not proceed to study the Hypatian text further until he had received a complete copy, Schlözer incessantly wrote letters urging Bashilov (who did not respond for over six months) to hurry up and send him a copy ("I am waiting for the requested copy of the Hypatian Codex every mail day" in an August 1768 letter), which finally arrived a few days later. The reason was that after Schlözer left Saint Petersburg to continue his work in Göttingen, Bashilov and Polenov were assigned to continue work on the Nikon Chronicle's publication instead. The Academy tried to get Schlözer to return to Petersburg as late as February 1769, and eventually terminated his contract per 1 January 1770, which effectively terminated the work on Rus' chronicle publications, and leaving Bashilov without a job (and dying from tuberculosis on 11 July 1770). Polenov resigned in April 1771. The Hypatian Codex was forgotten by almost everyone including empress Catherine in the decades thereafter. The Czech scholar Josef Dobrovský probably briefly examined it in autumn 1792.

After the Khlebnikov Codex was accidentally discovered in the summer of 1809, Nikolay Karamzin began searching for the Hypatian Codex. It was rediscovered after he asked Academy president Novosiltsev to help find it, and delivered to Karamzin in Moscow in early October 1809. When Karamzin finally began publishing abstracts of the Hypatian Codex as part of his magnum opus History of the Russian State from 1816 onwards, the scholarly community was finally introduced with the codex on a large scale. The first full publication of the Hypatian Codex would not see the light until 1871.

== Composition ==
The codex contains the second-oldest surviving manuscript of the Primary Chronicle, after the Laurentian Codex. The Hypatian manuscript dates back to c. 1425, but it incorporates much precious information from the lost 12th-century Kievan and 13th-century Galician-Volhynia chronicles. The codex was possibly compiled at the end of the 13th century.

The title page, written in red letters, names it Лѣт̑писеч̑ Рускии . съ Бм҃ъ починаємь . ѡч҃е блгс̑в ("Rus' chronicle. Let us begin with God. Father, bless us"), and continues in black letters with Повѣсть временныхъ лѣт̑ ("The Tale of Bygone Years"). The flyleaf contains, in relatively recent handwriting, the title Лeтoпиceц Киeвcкий ("The Kievan Chronicle"), and includes the names of two previous owners of the codex: "i. The book of the servant of the Ipatiev Monastery Tikhon Mizhuev. ii. The book of the monk of the Ipatiev Monastery Tarasij."

== See also ==
- Novgorod First Chronicle
- The Tale of Igor's Campaign

== Bibliography ==
=== Editions ===
- Izbornyk (1908). Лѣтопись По Ипатьевскому Списку [The Chronicle according to the Hypatian Codex]. Complete Collection of Russian Chronicles (PSRL). Volume 2. 3rd Edition. Col. 15. Saint Petersburg: Typography of Edward Prats.

=== Literature ===
- Dimnik, Martin (1994). The Dynasty of Chernigov 1054–1146. Pontifical Institute of Mediaeval Studies. p. xii. ISBN 0-88844-116-9.
- Maiorov, Alexander V. (November 2018). ""I Would Sacrifice Myself for my Academy and its Glory!" August Ludwig von Schlözer and the Discovery of the Hypatian Chronicle". Russian History. 45 (4). Brill: 319–340.
- Perfecky, George A. (1973). The Hypatian Codex Part Two: The Galician–Volynian Chronicle. An annotated translation by George A. Perfecky. Munich: Wilhelm Fink Verlag. OCLC 902306.
- Velychenko, Stephen (1992). National History as Cultural Process: A Survey of the Interpretations of Ukraine's Past in Polish, Russian, and Ukrainian Historical Writing from the Earliest Times to 1914 (illustrated ed.). CIUS Press. p. 142. ISBN 0-920862-75-6.
