= Sylvester of Kiev =

Slavic clergyman and writer

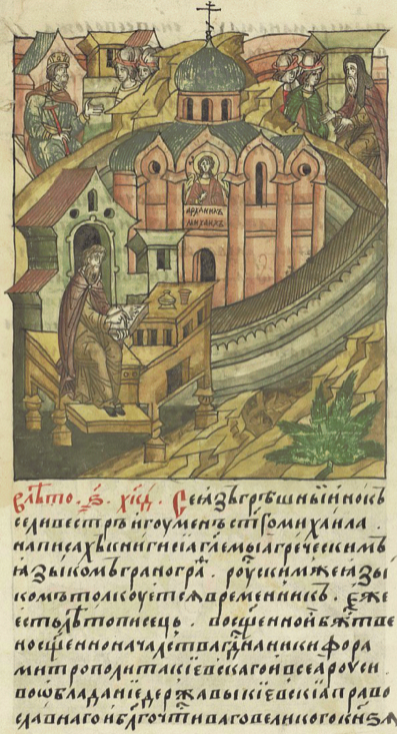

Sylvester of Kiev (Church Slavonic: Сильвестр, romanized: Sil'vestr) (c. 1055 – 1123, aged 67–68) was a clergyman and a writer in Kievan Rus'.

Some sources name Sylvestr as a compiler of either the Primary Chronicle itself or its second edition. He was a hegumen of the Vydubetsky Monastery in Kiev, which had been founded by Prince Vsevolod Yaroslavich. In 1118, Sylvestr was sent to Pereiaslav as a bishop.

As a person close to Vsevolod's son Vladimir Monomakh, Sylvestr played a notable role in political and ecclesiastical affairs of Kievan Rus.

He is said to have continued the work of St. Nestor the Chronicler and written nine Lives of the holy saints of the Kiev Caves. He is celebrated on January 2, on September 28 as part of the Synaxis of the Venerable Fathers of the Kiev Near Caves, and on the Second Sunday of Great Lent as part of the Synaxis of the Venerable Fathers of the Kiev Caves Lavra.
