= Primary Chronicle =

12th-century chronicle of Kievan Rus'

- Tale of Bygone Years
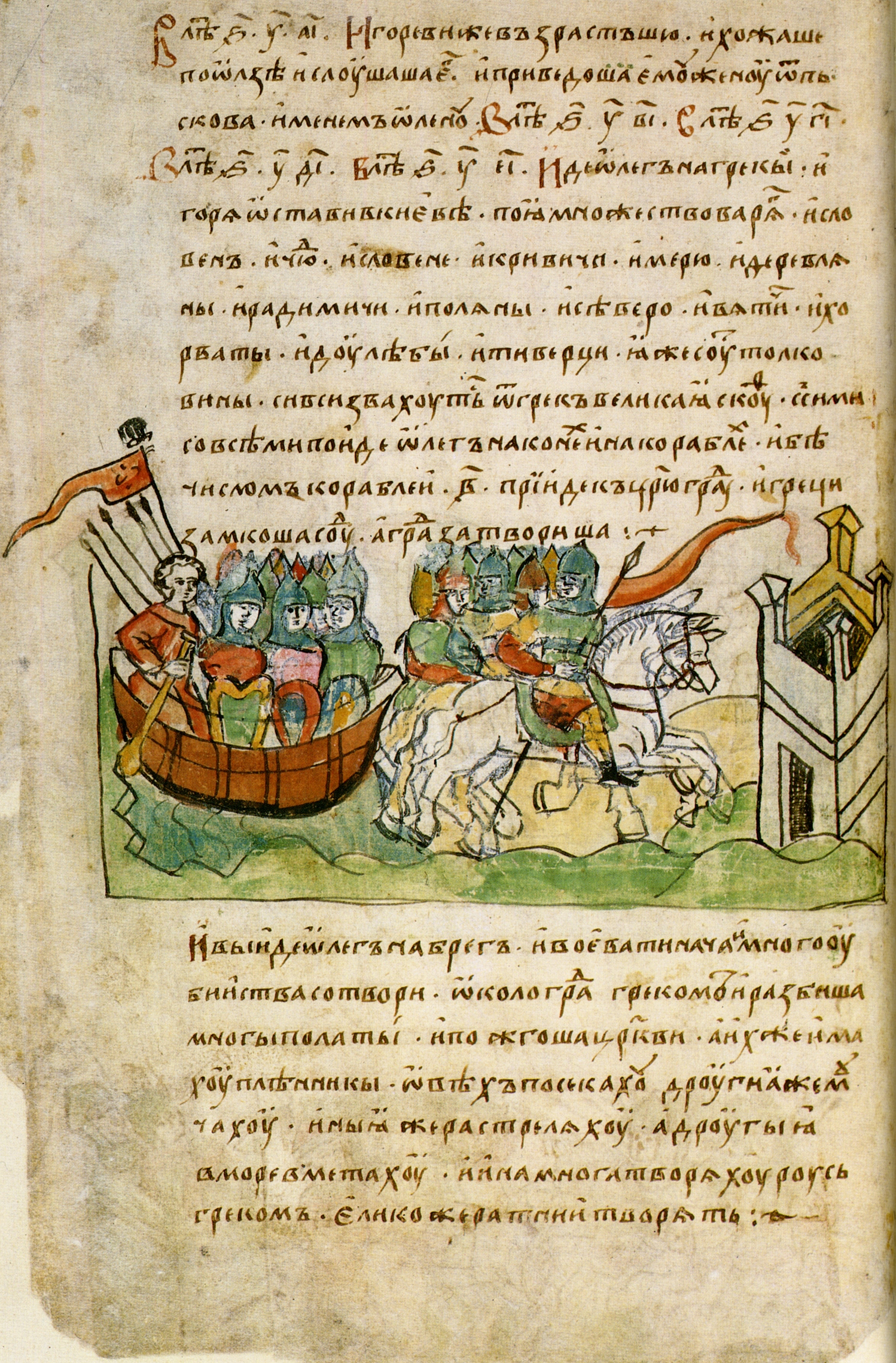
- Sheet from the Radziwiłł Chronicle
- Author(s): Traditionally attributed to Nestor, now considered unknown
- Language: Old East Slavic (with Old Church Slavonic elements)
- Date: c. 1113
- Manuscript(s): 5 main surviving codices: Laurentian Codex (1377); Hypatian Codex (c. 1425); Radziwiłł Chronicle (c. 1500); Academic Chronicle (c. 1500); Khlebnikov Codex (c. 1575)
- Genre: Chronicle
- Period covered: From biblical times to 1117 CE

The Primary Chronicle (Old East Slavic: Повѣсть времѧньныхъ лѣтъ, romanized: Pověstĭ vremęnĭnyxŭ lětŭ, lit. 'Tale of Bygone Years'), (Note: Scholarly literature commonly transliterates the title as Povest' vremennykh let, abbreviated PVL.) shortened from the Russian Primary Chronicle, (Note: The name comes from Samuel Hazzard Cross's 1930 translation. Also known as the Rus' Primary Chronicle.) is a chronicle of Kievan Rus' from about 850 to 1110. It was compiled in Kiev in the 1110s. Medieval tradition attributed the work to the monk Nestor the Chronicler (hence Nestor's Chronicle), but modern scholars consider it an anonymous compilation edited by several authors, including Hegumen Sylvester of Kiev in 1116.

The title comes from the opening line of the Laurentian text: "These are the narratives of bygone years regarding the origin of the land of Rus', the first princes of Kiev, and from what source the land of Rus' had its beginning". (Note: Old East Slavic: Се повѣсти времѧньныхъ лѣтъ, ѿкуду есть пошла рускаӕ зем[л]ѧ, кто въ киевѣ нача первѣе кнѧжити, и ѿкуду рускаӕ землѧ стала есть.) The narrative covers the legendary origins of the Slavs, the calling of the Varangians, the rise of the Rurik dynasty, and the 988 Christianization of Kievan Rus' under Vladimir the Great.

The chronicle is the main written source for the early history of the East Slavs. Its authors drew on oral traditions, legal treaties, and Byzantine chronicles such as those of John Malalas and George Hamartolos. The original manuscript has not survived; the text is known only from later copies, primarily the 1377 Laurentian Codex and the 15th-century Hypatian Codex. Because the surviving manuscripts contain chronological errors, folklore, and political revisions, historians treat its historical accuracy critically.

== Authorship and composition ==
=== Authorship ===
The Historian Nestor by Leo Mol

The Chronicle was long regarded as the first compilation of the work of a monk named Nestor (c. 1056 – c. 1114), who was also known to have written the Life of the Venerable Theodosius. Writers of the time spoke of the Chronicle of Nestor, and of the author as Nestor "the Chronicler." Based on the 1661 Paterik of the Kiev Monastery of the Caves, late 17th-century writers began to assert that Nestor "the Chronicler" wrote many of the surviving Rus' chronicles, including the Primary Chronicle, the Kievan Chronicle and the Galician–Volhynian Chronicle, even though many of the events they described took place in the 12th and 13th century, long after Nestor's death c. 1114. Another reason given for belief in Nestorian authorship was the word "нестера" in the opening lines of the Khlebnikov Codex (discovered in 1809), which some readers took to refer to Nestor "the Chronicler". According to Donald Ostrowski: "The word нестера was added in the Khlebnikov Codex, and thus cannot be used as evidence for the name of the compiler of the PVL." The word is not found in any of the other five main versions of the Primary Chronicle, (Note: The often careless Vasily Tatishchev (1686–1750) claimed that three Chronicle texts that were somehow "lost" later also identified "Nestor" as the author. Modern scholars distrust all such "Tatishchev information" unless they are supported by another extant source.) and is thus an interpolation inserted into the text by an editor, perhaps guessing at the author's name. From the 1830s to around 1900, there was fierce academic debate about Nestor's authorship, but the question remains unresolved, and belief in Nestorian authorship persists. The internal evidence of the Primary Chronicle and the known works of Nestor often contradict one another, while the contents barely coincide in places where they seemingly should, so modern scholars have concluded that Nestor was not the author. (Note: 'In any case, the internal evidence of the Povest', along with the lack of coincidence of its contents with Nestor's works wherever the two are related, is distinctly opposed to the tradition of Nestorian authorship.')

A more likely candidate for the author of the Chronicle is Sylvester of Kiev, the hegumen (abbot) of the St. Michael's Monastery in Vydubychi, situated near Kiev, who may have compiled several sources in the year 1116. This attribution is based on the fact that the Laurentian text ends on page 286, lines 1 to 7, with the colophon "I wrote down (napisakh) this chronicle", (Note: Church Slavonic: Игуменъ силивестръ стаг михаила· написах книгы си лѣтописець·, romanized: Igumenʺ silivestrʺ stag mikhaila· napisakh knigy si lětopisecʹ·, lit. 'Abbot Silivestr" of St. Michael's Abbey – I wrote this chronicle [lit. "book of year writings"].') after which he requests the readers to remember him in their prayers. Alternately, the real author may have been some other unnamed monk from the Kiev Monastery of the Caves mentioned in the title, and Sylvester completed his work, or was a very early editor or copyist of the Primary Chronicle.

=== Editions ===
Władysław Duczko argued that one of the central aims of the Primary Chronicle's narrative is to 'give an explanation how the Rurikids came to power in the lands of the Slavs, why the dynasty was the only legitimate one, and why all the princes should end their infighting and rule in peace and brotherly love.'

In the year 1116, Nestor's text was extensively edited by the hegumen Sylvester who appended his name at the end of the chronicle. As Vladimir II Monomakh was the patron of the village of Vydubychi, where Sylvester's monastery was situated, the new edition glorified Monomakh and made him the central figure of later narrative. This second version of Nestor's work is preserved in the Laurentian Codex (see § Surviving manuscripts).

A third edition followed two years later, centered on Monomakh's son and heir, Mstislav the Great. The author of this revision could have been Greek, for he corrected and updated much data on Byzantine affairs. This revision of Nestor's work is preserved in the Hypatian Codex (see § Surviving manuscripts).

=== Composition ===
The organization, style, and narrative flow of the Primary Chronicle shows signs of compilation, different historical elements are brought together into a single cohesive historical account. Studies by Russian philologist Aleksey Shakhmatov and his followers have demonstrated that the Primary Chronicle is not a single literary work but an amalgamation of a number of ancestors accounts and documents. In compiling the Chronicle, some of Nestor's original sources definitely included but were not limited to:

- The chronological table in the Primary Chronicle was derived from the Chronographikon Syntomon written by patriarch Nikephoros I of Constantinople (died 829)
- the Byzantine annals of John Malalas, a Greek chronicler, who in 563 produced an 18+book work of myth and truth intertwined.
- the Byzantine annals of the monk George Hamartolus (literally "the Sinner", as he called himself; also known as "George the Monk") who tried to adhere strictly to truth, and whose works are the only contemporary source for the period 813–842
- byliny, traditional East Slavic oral epic narrative poems
- Norse sagas
- several Greek religious texts
- Rus'–Byzantine treaties
- oral tradition, but how much "is very difficult to tell".

There probably were no "earlier local chronicles". The hypothesis that a local chronicle was written before the late 980s at the St Elias church in Kiev "has to remain an unproven speculation".

Linguistically speaking, the Primary Chronicle is written in Old East Slavic, with strong Old Church Slavonic (early South Slavic) elements. Although these two languages were quite similar up to the early 12th century, with few phonological, morphological and lexical differences at that point, scholars have noted a general pattern of religious passages and moral teachings featuring strong Old Church Slavonic elements, whereas entries on events in specific years are dominated by Old East Slavic elements. Nevertheless, there are no clear linguistic boundaries between the two, as profane (secular) passages sometimes feature Old Church Slavonicisms, while devotional passages sometimes feature Old East Slavicisms. In the view of many modern linguistics, the authors (and editors) of the Primary Chronicle probably considered the language they wrote in to be one single language. However, this literary language likely differed significantly from the Old East Slavic spoken lingua franca in contemporary Kiev, which appears to have been an amalgamation of several Old East Slavic dialects, with relatively few Old Church Slavonic influences.

== Surviving manuscripts ==
Because the original of the chronicle as well as the earliest known copies are lost, it is difficult to establish the original content of the chronicle. The six main manuscripts preserving the Primary Chronicle which scholars study for the purpose of textual criticism are: (Note: According to Gippius (2014), the six main manuscripts can be divided in three groups of two: Laurentian/Trinity (LT), Radziwiłł/Academic (RA), and Hypatian/Khlebnikov (HX). Gippius considered the last group the "southern, Kievan branch" and the other four the "Vladimir-Suzdal branch".)

- Laurentian Codex (1377)
- Hypatian Codex (c. 1425)
- Radziwiłł Chronicle (c. 1500)
- Academic Chronicle (c. 1500)
- Khlebnikov Codex (c. 1575)
- Trinity Chronicle (c. 1450; excluded by some scholars who count only "five main witnesses")

=== Laurentian Codex ===
The Laurentian Codex was compiled in Nizhny Novgorod-Suzdal by the Nizhegorodian monk Laurentius for the Prince Dmitry Konstantinovich in 1377. The original text he used was a codex (since lost) compiled in 1305 for the Grand Prince of Vladimir, Mikhail of Tver. The account continues until 1305, but the years 898–922, 1263–83 and 1288–94 are missing for reasons unknown. The manuscript was acquired by the famous Count Musin-Pushkin in 1792 and subsequently presented to the National Library of Russia in Saint Petersburg.

=== Hypatian Codex ===
The Hypatian Codex dates to the 15th century. It incorporates much information from the lost 12th-century Kievan Chronicle and 13th-century Galician–Volhynian Chronicle. The language of this work is the East Slavic version of Church Slavonic language with many additional irregular east-slavisms (like other east-Slavic codices of the time). Whereas the Laurentian (Muscovite) text traces the Kievan legacy through to the Muscovite princes, the Hypatian text traces the Kievan legacy through the rulers of the Halych principality. The Hypatian codex was rediscovered in Kiev in the 1620s, and a copy was made for Prince Kostiantyn Ostrozhsky. A copy was found in Russia in the 18th century at the Ipatiev Monastery of Kostroma by the Russian historian Nikolai Karamzin.

Numerous monographs and published versions of the chronicle have been made, the earliest known being in 1767. Aleksey Shakhmatov published a pioneering textological analysis of the narrative in 1908. Dmitry Likhachev and other Soviet scholars partly revisited his findings. Their versions attempted to reconstruct the pre-Nestorian chronicle, compiled at the court of Yaroslav the Wise in the mid-11th century.

== Contents ==
=== Stories ===
The early part of the PVL features many anecdotal stories, among them:

- The supposed biblical origins of the Slavs from a son of Noah mentioned in the Hebrew Bible;
- the early history of the Slavs, with the banks of the river Danube in the regions of Hungary, Illyria, and Bulgaria described as their place of original settlement;
- the legendary founding of Kiev by Kyi, Shchek, Khoryv and Lybid';
- the labors of Saints Cyril and Methodius among the Slavic peoples;
- the calling of the Varangians;
- the murder of Askold and Dir, by which Oleg the Wise conquered Kiev;
- the death of Oleg in 912, the "cause" of which was allegedly foreseen by him;
- the legendary vengeance taken by Olga, the wife of Igor, on the Drevlians, who had murdered her husband; (Her actions secured Kievan Rus' from the Drevlians, preventing her from having to marry a Drevlian prince, and allowing her to act as regent until her young son came of age.)
- the Siege of Kiev (968) by the Pechenegs;
- the legendary Conversion of Vladimir the Great;
- the Kievan succession crisis after Vladimir's death, Yaroslav's rise to power, and the Battle of Listven.

Women play a relatively minor role in the Primary Chronicle, usually only as the unnamed wife or daughter of a named man. There are very few women mentioned by their full personal (Christian) names in the PVL, including: Princess Olga of Kiev, abbess Ianka or Anna Vsevolodovna of Kiev, her sister Eupraxia Vsevolodovna of Kiev (alias Holy Roman Empress Adelheid), Predslava Volodimerovna, Predslava Sviatopolkovna of Kiev, and Catherine (Katerina) Vsevolodovna (died 1108).

=== Chronology ===
The chronology offered by the Primary Chronicle (PVL) is sometimes at odds with that of other documents such as the Novgorod First Chronicle (NPL) and Byzantine literature. Sometimes the Primary Chronicle also contradicts itself, especially between narrative and chronological parts, which appear to have been written by two different authors. Several scholars including Aleksey Shakhmatov (1897), Mikhail Tikhomirov (1960), Ia. S. Lur’e (1970), and Constantin Zuckerman (1995) have concluded that the 9th- and 10th-century dates mentioned in the PVL were not added to the text until the 11th century, unless directly copied from the Chronicle of George the Monk.

==== Opening date error ====
The historical period covered in the Tale of Bygone Years begins with biblical times, in the introductory portion of the text, and concludes with the year 1117 in the chronicle's third edition. Russian philologist Aleksey Shakhmatov was the first one to discover early on that the chronology of the Primary Chronicle opens with an error. The Laurentian text of the Chronicle says: "In the year 6360 (852), the fifteenth of the indiction, at the accession of the Emperor Michael, the land of Rus' was first named". It is thus claimed that the reign of Byzantine emperor Michael III began in this year, but Byzantine sources (such as 11th-century Greek historian John Skylitzes' account ) point out that it began on 21 January 842. Shakhmatov (1897) demonstrated that an editor based himself on a miscalculation found in the Short History of Nikephoros I of Constantinople. Moreover, a few sentences later, the text states: 'from the birth of Christ to Constantine, 318 years; and from Constantine to Michael, 542 years. Twenty-nine years passed between the first year of Michael's reign and the accession of Oleg, Prince of Rus'.' However, Constantine the Great acceded in 313, not 318, and the resulting sum of 318+542 years leads to another erroneous accession of Michael III, this time in 860. This then leads to an internal contradiction, when "Michael the Emperor" is said to have mounted a campaign against the Bulgars in 853–858 (6361–6366), which could not have happened before he became Byzantine emperor in 860 according to the latter accession date.

==== Major events ====
Chronology of major events:

- 852 (6360): The principal date mentioned in the Primary Chronicle, when the land of Rus' was first named in the Greek chronicle of George Hamartolos; this is evidence that the compiler used it as one of the sources for the Primary Chronicle.
- 859: 'The Varangians from beyond the sea imposed tribute upon the Chuds, the Slavs, the Merians, the Ves', and the Krivichians. But the Khazars imposed it upon the Polyanians, the Severians, and the Vyatichians'.
- 862: The calling of the Varangians. The various tributaries of the Varangians attempted to rid themselves of the Varangian lordship, which led to quarrels among the tribes and culminated in them inviting a knyaz ("prince") from the Varangians to rule over them. As a result, the three Varangian brothers Rurik, Sineus and Truvor and their kinsfolk crossed the sea and settled themselves in various localities, and it is claimed that it was after these Varangians that the land of Rus' would eventually be named. Around the same time, two other Varangians called Askold and Dir captured the town of Kiev.
- 866 (6374): The Siege of Constantinople (860) by Rus' forces. According to Byzantine sources, this happened in 860, not 866.
- 881/2 (6390): Rurik's successor, Oleg, sent messengers to Askold and Dir, representing himself as a stranger on his way to Greece on an errand for Oleg and for Igor', the prince's son, requesting a meeting. He then ambushed Askold and Dir, saying: "You are not princes nor even of princely stock, but I am of princely birth." Igor' was then brought forward, and Oleg announced that he was the son of Rurik. They killed Askold and Dir, and after carrying them to the hill, they buried them there, on the hill now known as Uhorska (Hungarian hill), where the castle of Ol'ma now stands.' Then 'Oleg set himself up as prince in Kiev' (Church Slavonic: къняжа въ Киеве, romanized: kŭnyaza vŭ Kyeve) 'and declared that it should be the mother of Rus' cities.' According to the text's aforementioned chronology of Oleg's accession 29 years after Michael III in 860, Oleg's reign should have begun in 889 rather than 881/2.
- 883: Prince Oleg conquers the Derevlians.
- 884–885: Prince Oleg defeats the Radimichians and the Severians, bringing them under his rule.
- 907: Prince Oleg launched an incursion against the Greeks, resulting in a favorable treaty for Rus'. The Greek emperor Leo conceded to provide allowances for Oleg's men, award them a right to stay and trade in Constantinople free of tax, and to enter unconditional peace. This event is not mentioned in Byzantine sources.
- 912: After Oleg's prophetic death from a snakebite, prince Igor succeeded him as the ruler of Rus' and was neither "successful in his military campaigns nor popular with people." According to the Novgorod First Chronicle, Oleg died in 922; if Oleg (Helgi) is the same person as HLGW, "king of the Rus'", in the Genizah Letter, he would still have been alive in the 940s.
- Ca. 945: Prince Igor was murdered in the act of uprising by the Derevlians. His wife Olga assumed the throne following her husband's death and brought revenge upon Igor's murderers. Some of the Derevlians were burned in their homes, others were buried alive, while the remaining were simply slaughtered. Olga later ruled as a regent for her young son Svyatoslav, who went on to have an extensive military career as an adult, venturing East against the Khazars and the Bulgars.
- 972: Svyatoslav was killed in a Pecheneg ambush while returning from one of his frequent campaigns against the Greeks.
- 973: The reign of Yaropolk began and was complicated by quarrels with his two brothers, Oleg and Vladimir.
- 978–980: Yaropolk proved himself victorious against his brother Oleg but died at the hands of men of his other brother Vladimir. After inheriting the throne, Vladimir initially upheld pagan practices and worshipped Perun.
- 986–988: The conversion of Volodimer: Vladimir was baptized into Orthodoxy, which later became referred to as the "Baptism of Rus'" because it was followed by a widespread Christianization of Kievan Rus'. The entire conversion story covers a large chunk of the Primary Chronicle: pages 84–121, or 37 out of a total of 286 pages (12.9%) of the entire text.
- 1015: Following Vladimir's death, Svyatopolk inherited the title of the Prince of Kiev and became known as Svyatopolk the Accursed for his violent actions towards his siblings.
- 1019: Svyatopolk was overthrown by his brother Yaroslav the Wise, whose reign brought an end to the unified kingdom of Rus but laid the foundation for the development of the written tradition in the Kievan Rus'.
- 1054: After Yaroslav's death, the kingdom was split into five princedoms with Izyaslav ruling in Kiev, Svyatoslav in Chernigov, Igor in Volodymyr, Vsevolod in Pereiaslav, and Rostislav in Tmutarakan’.
- 1076: Vsevolod held a victory over his four rivals and became the Grand Prince of Kiev.
- 1093: After Vsevolod’s death, Svyatopolk reigned over the Kievan Rus.
- 1113: Rise to power of Vladimir Monomakh, whose religious testament and prayers were appended at the end of the Chronicle by monk Sylvester, working from St. Michael’s monastery in 1116.

== Christian elements ==
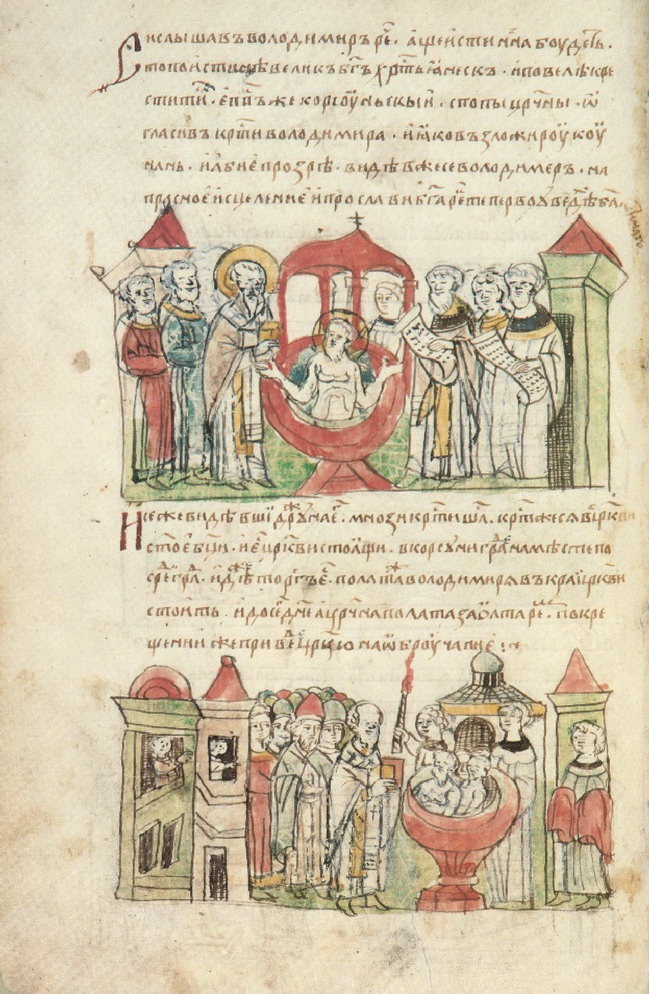
The baptism of Prince Vladimir I in Korsun in 988 (from the Radziwiłł Chronicle)

The Primary Chronicle is vibrant with Christian themes and biblical allusions, which are often said to reflect the text’s monastic authorship. Aleksandr Koptev remarks that the Chronicle belongs to the genre of Christian literature. In the introduction, the chronicler explores the biblical origin of the Slavic people, and traces their heritage back to Noah. On numerous occasions throughout the text, the chronicler discusses the pagan Slavs in a condescending manner, saying "for they were but pagans, and therefore ignorant." Later in the Chronicle, one of the most pivotal moments of the narrative is Vladimir the Great's conversion to Orthodox Christianity, which ignited extensive Christianization of Kievan Rus'.

=== Biblical origin ===
The Primary Chronicle traces the history of the Slavic people all the way back to the times of Noah, whose three sons inherited the Earth:

- Shem inherited the eastern region: Persia, Bactria, Syria, Media, Babylon, Cordyna, Assyria, Mesopotamia, Arabia, Elymais, India, Coelesyria, Commagene, Phoenicia.
- Ham inherited the southern region: Egypt, Libya, Numidia, Massyris, Maurentania, Cilicia, Pamphylia, Mysia, Lycaonia, Phrygia, Camalia, Lycia. Caria, Lydia, Moesia, Troas, Aeolia, Bithynia, Sardinia, Crete, Cyprus.
- Japheth gained north-western territories: Armenia, Britain, Illyria, Dalmatia, Ionia, Macedonia, Media, Paphlagonia, Cappadocia, Scythia, and Thessaly.

The Varangians, the Swedes, the Normans, the Rus, and others were named as descendants of Japheth. In the very beginning, humanity was united into a single nation, but after the fall of the Tower of Babel, the Slavic race was derived from the line of Japheth, "since they are the Noricians, who are identified with the Slavs."

=== Korsun legend ===
According to the so-called "Korsun legend", presented in the Chronicle just preceding the conversion of Volodimer, the Prince took possession of the Greek city of Korsun (Chersonesus) in the Crimean Peninsula, in an attempt to gain certain benefits from Emperor Basil. Following Vladimir's successful conquest of the city, he demanded that the Emperor's 'unwedded' sister be given up for marriage with him. Upon hearing the news from Korsun, emperor Basil responded that "It is not meet for Christians to be given in marriage to pagans. If you are baptized, you shall have her to wife, inherit the kingdom of God, and be our companion in faith." The legend concludes with Vladimir's embrace of Christianity at the church of St. Basil in Korsun and his marriage to the Emperor's sister, Anna Porphyrogenita.

=== Archaeological findings ===
For centuries after the Chronicle’s creation, the legend's factuality was subject to extensive debate. Many historians, antiquarians, and archaeologists had attempted to determine the actual location of Vladimir's conversion by synthesizing textual evidence of the Chronicle with material evidence from Crimea. Their efforts became known in the realms of historical discipline as the "archaeology of the Korsun legend." This search culminated under Archbishop Innokentii's diocesan administration (1848–57), when in the ruins of Chersonesos, archaeologists unearthed the foundations of three churches and determined that the one containing the richest findings was allegedly used for the baptism of the Kievan Prince. The unearthed material evidence proved sufficient to pinpoint the real location of the legend's events with reasonable accuracy.

In the early 1860s, the Eastern Orthodox Church began construction of The Saint Vladimir Cathedral in Chersonesos, which has been destroyed on three occasions after first being erected and was renovated each time thereafter. The cathedral last faced destruction during the October Revolution and was not restored until the fall of the Soviet Union. It has been argued that by honoring Vladimir the Great and his contribution to the Eastern Orthodoxy, the cathedral serves the purpose of validating Russia's historical ties with the Crimean Peninsula, the accounts of which are preserved by the Chronicle.

== Assessment and critique ==
Unlike many other medieval chronicles written by European monks, the Tale of Bygone Years is unique as the only written testimony on the earliest history of East Slavic people. Its comprehensive account of the history of Rus' is unmatched in other sources, but important correctives are provided by the Novgorod First Chronicle. It is also valuable as a prime example of the Old East Slavonic literature.

However, its reliability has been widely called into question and placed under careful examination by contemporary specialists in the field of the Old East Slavonic history. The first doubts about trustworthiness of the narratives were voiced by Nikolay Karamzin in his History of the Russian State (1816–26), which brought attention to Nestor's questionable chronology and style of prose. Building upon Karamzin's observations, further inquiries into the philology of the Rus Primary Chronicle shined more light on various weaknesses in the text's composition. According to Dmitry Likhachov (1950), the chronicle exhibits the presence of plentiful "fillers" that were added post factum and, in effect, "destroyed the narrative's logical progression."

According to Aleksey Shakhmatov (1916), some of the incongruities are a direct result of the fact that "the ruling Princes of Kiev had their own propagandists who rewrote the annals to make political claims that best suited their own purposes." Shakhmatov further described the Tale of Bygone Years as a literary creation that fell under heavy influence of the Church and the State. Dmitry Likhachov famously wrote in his 1950 critique of the Rus Primary Chronicle, "No other country in the world is cloaked in such contradictory myths about its history as Russia, and no other nation in the world interprets its history as variously as do the Russian people." The need to interpret the Chronicle, mentioned by Likhachov as essential to making sense of its narrative, stems from the facts that the text was initially compiled and edited by multiple authors with different agendas and that it had to be translated from Old East Slavic language, which proved to be an arduous task.

Harvard linguist Horace G. Lunt (1988) found it important to "admit freely that we are speculating" when tales – such as Yaroslav the Wise being more than just "a patron of Slavonic books" – are reconstructed and the logical incongruities of the text are faced.

Polish historian Wladyslaw Duczko (2004) concluded that the compiler of the Primary Chronicle 'manipulated his sources in the usual way: information that was not compatible was left aside, while the elements that should be there but did not exist, were invented.' Russian historian and author Igor Danilevsky mentioned that the Rus Primary Chronicle was more concerned with exploring the religious significance of the events rather than conveying to the reader the information about how it actually happened. As a result, a sizable portion of the text was directly borrowed from earlier works that contained a religious undertone like some Byzantine sources, and most notably, the Bible. The protagonists are frequently identified with biblical personages and so are ascribed certain relevant qualities and deeds that did not necessarily match the reality.

Ukrainian historian Oleksiy Tolochko in 2015 upheld the conclusion reached by his many predecessors that the Chronicle’s contents are more or less fictional. Tolochko argued that some of the tales, like the story of the Rurikid clan's entry into Kiev, were invented "so as to produce a meaningful reconstruction of past events and include these well-known names" in the author's "historical scenario." Tolochko called the Rus Primary Chronicle an outstanding work of literature with an untrustworthy story and concluded that "there is absolutely no reason to continue basing our knowledge of the past on its content."

Paul Bushkovitch (2012) from Yale University writes "the author was serving his rulers, identifying princes and people and leaving historians with a muddle virtually impossible to sort out." He also mentions that there are discrepancies when overlapping Scandinavian history with the narrative of the Primary Chronicle. For example, "archeological evidence does not fit the legends of the Primary Chronicle" such as: "in Scandinavia itself, there were no sagas of Viking triumphs and wars in Russia to match those recounting the conquest of Iceland and the British Isles". The credibility of the Primary Chronicle should be taken with a grain of salt for its undertone of being a political tool to justify rule.

== Translations ==
August Ludwig von Schlözer produced a German translation with commentary of the Povest' vremennykh let through 980 in five volumes (Hecтopъ. Russische Annalen in ihrer Slavonischen Grund–Sprache. Göttingen, 1802–1809).

In 1930, Harvard professor Samuel Hazzard Cross published an English translation of the Laurentian Codex's version of the PVL under the title The Russian Primary Chronicle. Laurentian Text., which became very influential among American readers. Cross was working on a revised edition when he died; it was completed and published by Georgetown University professor Olgerd P. Sherbowitz-Wetzor in 1953. By the early 21st century, Primary Chronicle had become the common shortened English name for the text shared by the surviving five main manuscripts of the PVL. Nevertheless, Cross' translation was often found inaccurate, with Waugh (1974) writing that Perfecky (1973) had produced a more reliable English translation of the Galician–Volhynian Chronicle than how Cross translated the PVL.

The 2001 German translation by Ludolf Müller has been called 'without doubt the best available rendering of the PVL into a modern language'. The 2015 Dutch translation by Hans Thuis (begun with Victoria van Aalst since 2000) was based on the main six textual witnesses, scholarly publications by Müller, Likhachev and Ostrowski, and by comparison to the German translation of Trautmann (1931), the English translation of Cross & Sherbowitz-Wetzor (1930, 1953), the Russian translation of Likhachev (1950), and the German translation of Müller (2001).

== See also ==
- Freising manuscripts
- Nestor the Chronicler
- Russkaya Pravda

== Bibliography ==
=== Primary sources ===
==== Critical editions of original texts ====
- Лаврентьевская летопись [The Laurentian Chronicle.], Полное собрание русских летописей (ПСРЛ) (online edition) (in Russian), vol. 1, USSR Academy of Sciences, 1928, from the Laurentian Codex
- Ипатьевская летопись [Ipatiev Chronicle], Полное собрание русских летописей (ПСРЛ) (in Russian), vol. 2, Imperial Archaeological Commission, 1908, from the Hypatian Codex
- Новгородская первая летопись старшего и младшего изводов [Novgorod First Chronicle Older and Younger Editions] (in Russian), USSR Academy of Sciences, 1950, from the Novgorod First Chronicle
- Ostrowski, Donald, ed. (2003). The Povest' vremennykh let: An Interlinear Collation and Paradosis. 3 volumes (in Russian and English). Cambridge, MA: Harvard University Press. Archived from the original on 9 March 2005. (assoc. ed. David J. Birnbaum, Harvard Library of Early Ukrainian Literature, vol. 10, parts 1–3) – This 2003 Ostrowski et al. edition includes an interlinear collation including the five main manuscript witnesses, as well as a new paradosis ("a proposed best reading").
  - Ostrowski, Donald; Birnbaum, David J. (7 December 2014). "Rus' primary chronicle critical edition – Interlinear line-level collation". pvl.obdurodon.org (in Church Slavic). Archived from the original on 28 April 2025. – A 2014 improved digitised version of the 2002/2003 Ostrowski et al. edition.

==== Translations of original texts ====
Modern English

- Cross, Samuel Hazzard; Sherbowitz-Wetzor, Olgerd P. (1953). The Russian Primary Chronicle, Laurentian Text. Translated and edited by Samuel Hazzard Cross and Olgerd P. Sherbowitz-Wetzor (PDF). Cambridge, Massachusetts: The Mediaeval Academy of America. p. 325. (First edition published in 1930. The first 50 pages are a scholarly introduction.)
  - Cross, Samuel Hazzard; Sherbowitz-Wetzor, Olgerd P. (2013) [1953]. SLA 218. Ukrainian Literature and Culture. Excerpts from The Rus' Primary Chronicle (Povest vremennykh let, PVL) (PDF). Toronto: Electronic Library of Ukrainian Literature, University of Toronto. p. 16. Archived from the original (PDF) on 30 May 2014.
- Excerpts from "Tales of Times Gone By" [Povest' vremennykh let] (Lecture Notes), University of Oregon, archived from the original on 7 December 2008.

Modern Russian

- "Laurentian Codex 1377: digitisation of the Laurentian Codex, including transliteration and translation into modern Russian, with an introduction in English" (in Church Slavic and Russian). National Library of Russia. 2012.

Modern German

- Müller, Ludolf (2001). Die Nestorchronik: die altrussische Chronik, zugeschrieben dem Mönch des Kiever Höhlenklosters Nestor, in der Redaktion des Abtes Silvestr aus dem Jahre 1116, rekonstruiert nach den Handschriften Lavrentevskaja, Radzivilovskaja, Akademiceskaja, Troickaja, Ipatevskaja und Chlebnikovskaja (in German). Munich: Wilhelm Fink Verlag. p. 366. ISBN 377053428X.
- Trautmann, Reinhold, Die altrussische Nestorchronik (Leipzig 1931, Wiesbaden 1948), pp. 76. Leipzig: Markert & Petters. Wiesbaden: Harrassowitz. (based only on the Laurentian Codex).

Modern Dutch

- Thuis, Hans (2015). Nestorkroniek. De oudste geschiedenis van het Kievse Rijk (in Dutch). Nijmegen: Uitgeverij Vantilt. p. 304. ISBN 9789460042287.

Modern Spanish

- García de la Puente, Inés (2019). Relato de los años pasados. Edición preparada por Inés García de la Puente (in Spanish). Madrid: Biblioteca de Autores Cristianos. p. 296. ISBN 978-8422020721.

=== Literature ===
- Dimnik, Martin (January 2004). "The Title "Grand Prince" in Kievan Rus'". Mediaeval Studies. 66: 253–312. doi:10.1484/J.MS.2.306512.
- Duczko, Władysław (2004). Viking Rus: Studies on the Presence of Scandinavians in Eastern Europe. Leiden: Brill. p. 290. ISBN 9789004138742.
- Gippius, Alexey A. (2014). "Reconstructing the original of the Povesť vremennyx let: a contribution to the debate". Russian Linguistics. 38 (3). Springer: 341–366. doi:10.1007/s11185-014-9137-y. JSTOR 43945126. S2CID 255017212.
- Isoaho, Mari (2018). "Shakhmatov's Legacy and the Chronicles of Kievan Rus'". Kritika: Explorations in Russian and Eurasian History. 19 (3). Slavica Publishers: 637–648. doi:10.1353/kri.2018.0033. S2CID 159688925.
- Lunt, Horace G. (Summer 1988). "On Interpreting the Russian Primary Chronicle: The Year 1037". The Slavic and East European Journal. 32 (2): 251–264. doi:10.2307/308891. JSTOR 308891.
- Lunt, Horace G. (June 1994). "Lexical Variation in the Copies of the Rus´ "Primary Chronicle": Some Methodological Problems". Ukrainian Philology and Linguistics. 18 (1–2). Harvard Ukrainian Research Institute: 10–28. JSTOR 41036551.
- Lunt, Horace G. (1995). "What the Rus' Primary Chronicle Tells Us about the Origin of the Slavs and of Slavic Writing". Harvard Ukrainian Studies. 19: 335–357. ISSN 0363-5570. JSTOR 41037009.
- Maiorov, Alexander V. (November 2018). ""I Would Sacrifice Myself for my Academy and its Glory!" August Ludwig von Schlözer and the Discovery of the Hypatian Chronicle". Russian History. 45 (4). Brill: 319–340. doi:10.1163/18763316-04504002. JSTOR 27072372. S2CID 191820897.
- Martin, Janet (2007). Medieval Russia: 980–1584. Second Edition. E-book. Cambridge: Cambridge University Press. ISBN 978-0-511-36800-4.
- Ostrowski, Donald (March 1981). "Textual Criticism and the Povest' vremennykh let: Some Theoretical Considerations". Harvard Ukrainian Studies. 5 (1). Harvard Ukrainian Research Institute: 11–31. JSTOR 41035890.
- Ostrowski, Donald (2018). "Was There a Riurikid Dynasty in Early Rus'?". Canadian-American Slavic Studies. 52 (1): 30–49. doi:10.1163/22102396-05201009.
- Raffensperger, Christian (2024). Name Unknown: The Life of a Rusian Queen. Routledge. p. 232. doi:10.4324/9781003325185. ISBN 978-1-04-003014-1.
- Tolochko, Oleksiy (2005). "История Российская" Василия Татищева: источники и известия "Istoriia Rossiiskaia" Vasiliia Tatishcheva: istochniki i izvestiia [Vasily Tatishchev's "History of Russia": Sources and Information]. Moscow: Новое литературное обозрение Novoe literaturnoe obozrenie. p. 543. ISBN 979-5-867-93346-2. ISBN 9795867933462 (also published at Kritika, Kyiv, 2005)
- Tolochko, Oleksiy (2007). "On "Nestor the Chronicler"". Harvard Ukrainian Studies. 29 (1). Harvard University: 31–59. JSTOR 41304501.
- Waugh, Daniel Clarke (December 1974). "Review". Slavic Review. 33 (4): 769–771. doi:10.2307/2494516. JSTOR 2494516. S2CID 163559666.

=== Further reading ===
- Chadwick, Nora Kershaw (1946). The Beginnings of Russian History: An Enquiry into Sources. Cambridge University Press.
- García De La Puente, Inés (1 December 2006). "Single Combats in the PVL. An Indo-European Comparative Analysis". Studi Slavistici: 19–30. doi:10.13128/STUDI_SLAVIS-2143.
- García de la Puente, Inés (2010). "What Route Does the Povest' vremennykh let Really Describe?". The Russian Review. 69 (3). Wiley: 373–387. doi:10.1111/j.1467-9434.2010.00572.x. ISSN 0036-0341. JSTOR 25677245.
- Morfill, William Richard (1911). "Nestor" . In Chisholm, Hugh (ed.). Encyclopædia Britannica. Vol. 19 (11th ed.). Cambridge University Press. pp. 406–407.
- Velychenko, Stephen (1992). National history as cultural process: A survey of the interpretations of Ukraine's past in Polish, Russian, and Ukrainian historical writing from the earliest times to 1914. Edmonton. ISBN 0-920862-75-6.
- Velychenko, Stephen (2007). "Nationalizing and Denationalizing the Past. Ukraine and Russia in Comparative Context". Ab Imperio (1).
