= Kievan Chronicle =

Chronicle of Kievan Rus'

The Kievan Chronicle or Kyivan Chronicle (Note: Russian: Киевская летопись, romanized: Kievskaya letopis; Ukrainian: Київський літопис, romanized: Kyivskyi litopys) is a chronicle of Kievan Rus'. It was written around 1200 in Vydubychi Monastery as a continuation of the Primary Chronicle. It is known from two manuscripts: a copy in the Hypatian Codex (c. 1425), and a copy in the Khlebnikov Codex (c. 1560s); in both codices, it is sandwiched between the Primary Chronicle and the Galician–Volhynian Chronicle. It covers the period from 1118, where the Primary Chronicle ends, until about 1200, although scholars disagree where exactly the Kievan Chronicle ends and the Galician–Volhynian Chronicle begins. (Note: Daniela S. Hristova (2006): 'Like the titles "Kievan" chronicle (KС) and "Galician-Volhynian" chronicle, the boundaries between these two chronicles as well as between the KС and PVL are a scholarly undertaking; there is nothing in the text itself that indicates where one chronicle ends and another begins. Unfortunately for us, the post-Gutenberg readers, medieval chronicles lack the punctuation that embellishes modern texts and the spacing between words, chapters, parts imposed by modern typography.')

== Composition ==
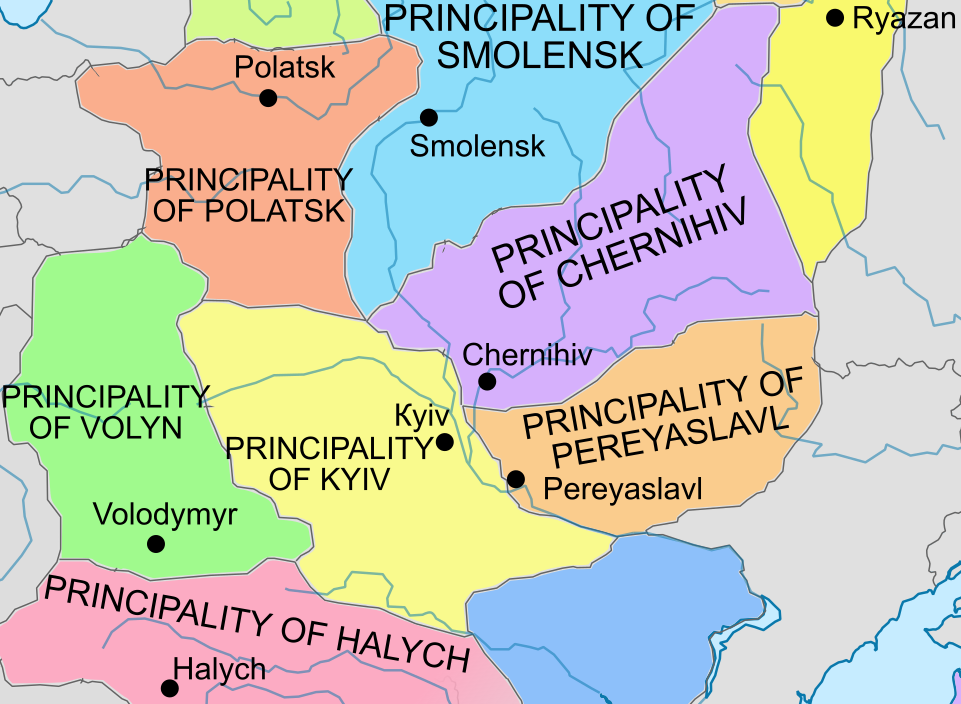
Central Kievan Rus' in 1132, in the middle of the period covered by the Kievan Chronicle

When historian Leonid Makhnovets published a modern Ukrainian translation of the entire Hypatian Codex in 1989, he remarked: 'The history of the creation of this early-14th-century chronicle [compilation] is a very complex problem. Equally complex is the question of when and how each part of the chronicle appeared. There is a vast literature on this subject, different views are expressed, and discussions are ongoing'.

Among the sources used by the anonymous chronicler of the Kievan Chronicle were:

- a chronicle of the city of Pereyaslavl;
- various family chronicles of the Monomakhovichi, specifically of Rurik Rostislavich, Igor Svyatoslavich (the protagonist in The Tale of Igor's Campaign), Oleg III Svyatoslavich, and Vladimir Glebovich; and
- a chronicle of Kyiv Pechersk Lavra (Monastery of the Caves).

There is evidence that a redactor added material from the Galician–Volhynian Chronicle in the 13th century. Because its sources, save for the monastic chronicle, are secular and were probably not written by monks, the Kievan Chronicle is a politico-military narrative of the disintegration of Kievan Rus', in which princes are the main players. It contains a historiographical account of the events celebrated in the epic Tale of Igor's Campaign, in which the basic sequence of events is the same. It also contains a passion narrative of the martyrdom of the prince Igor Olgovich in 1147.

Jaroslaw Pelenski (1987) pointed out that the Kievan Chronicle has a length of 431 columns, describing a period of about 80 years; a much higher information density than the Primary Chronicle, which describes as many as 258 years in only 283 (actually 286) columns. Nevertheless, at the time, the Kievan Chronicle had received far less attention from scholars than the Primary Chronicle. The text of the Kievan Chronicle shows strong similarities with that of the Suzdal'–Vladimirian Chronicle found in the Laurentian Codex and elsewhere, but also some remarkable differences.

- Primary Chronicle (PVL)
- Southern PVL continuation 1110–1116
- Kievan Chronicle
- Galician–Volhynian Chronicle
- Hustyn Chronicle continuation

== Authorship ==
Based on the 1661 Paterik of the Kievan Caves Monastery, 17th-century writers started to assert that Nestor wrote many of the surviving chronicles of Kievan Rus', including the Primary Chronicle, the Kievan Chronicle and the Galician–Volhynian Chronicle, even though many of the events described therein were situated in the entire 12th and 13th century (long after Nestor's death c. 1114). From the 1830s to around 1900, there was fierce academic debate about Nestor's authorship, but the question remained unresolved, and belief in Nestorian authorship had persisted.

== Contents ==
=== Structure ===
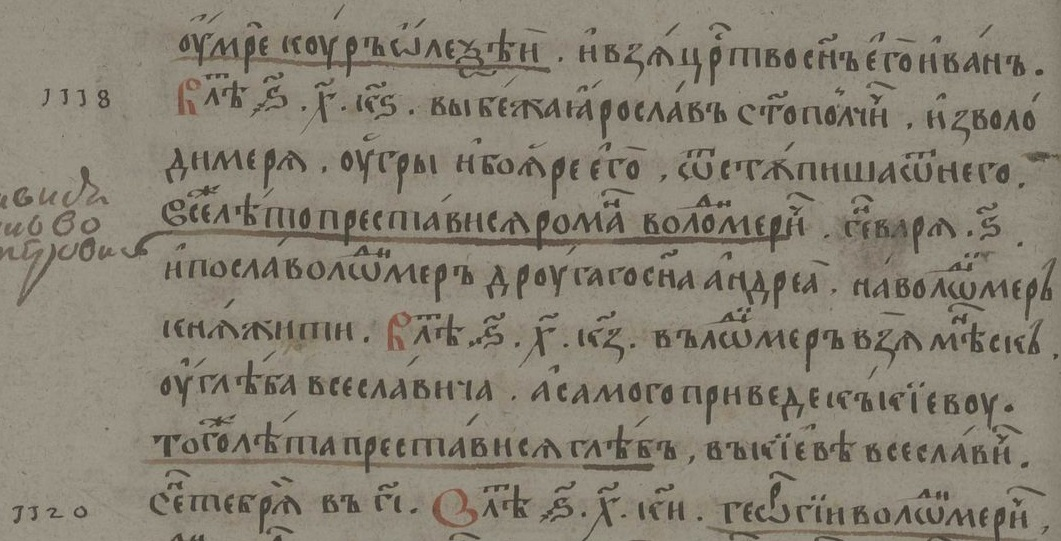
'In the year 1118, Jaroslav Svjatopolčič fled from the city of Vladimir /Volynskij/. The Hungarians /who were fighting with him/ and his boyars abandoned him. In this same year, on the sixth of January, Roman Vladimirič died, and Vladimir /Monomax/ sent another son, Andrej, to rule in the city of Vladimir.' – opening lines of the Kievan Chronicle as preserved in the Khlebnikov Codex, with an English translation based on Lisa Lynn Heinrich (1977)

Lisa Lynn Heinrich (1977) divided the Kievan Chronicle into the following chapters:

1. Last years of Vladimir II Monomakh; reign of Mstislav Vladimirovich (Mstislav I of Kiev, 1118–1126)
2. Reign of Vsevolod Olgovich (Vsevolod II of Kiev, 1140–1146)
3. Reign of Iziaslav Mstislavich (Iziaslav II of Kiev, 1146–1147)
4. Reign of Iziaslav Mstislavich (Iziaslav II of Kiev, 1148–1149)
5. Reign of Yuri Vladimirovich (Yuri Dolgorukiy, 1149–1150)
6. Reign of Yuri Vladimirovich (Yuri Dolgorukiy, 1151)
7. Reign of Yuri Vladimirovich (Yuri Dolgorukiy, 1152–1154)
8. Reigns of Rostislav Yuryevich (of Novgorod), Yuri Vladimirovich, and Iziaslav Davidovich (III of Kiev) (1154–1160)
9. Reign of Rostislav Mstislavich (Rostislav I of Kiev, 1160–1169)
10. Reigns of Mstislav Iziaslavich (Mstislav II of Kiev), Gleb Yurievich (Gleb of Kiev), Vladimir II Yaroslavich (of Halych), and Roman Rostislavich (Roman I of Kiev) (1169–1174)
11. Reign of Yaroslav Iziaslavich (Yaroslav II of Kiev, 1174–1180)
12. –15. Reigns of Sviatoslav Vsevolodovych (Sviatoslav III of Kiev), and Rurik Rostislavich (1180–1200)

=== Style and events ===
The Kievan Chronicle is a direction continuation of the text of the Primary Chronicle. The original text of the Kievan Chronicle has been lost; the versions preserved in the Hypatian Codex and Khlebnikov Codex are not copied from each other, but share a common ancestor that has (so far) not been found.

The Kievan Chronicle contains 72 announcements of princely deaths, 60 of which are about men who died as princes (84%), and 12 of them are about women who died as princesses (16%).

Unlike the Primary Chronicle, in which the Lithuanians were portrayed as a people which had been subdued by Yaroslav the Wise, and paid tributed to Kievan Rus' until at least the early 12th century, the Kievan Chronicle narrates about a 1132 campaign in which a Rus' army burnt down Lithuanian settlements, only to be ambushed by Lithuanians on the way back and taking heavy losses.

The Kievan Chronicle contains references to the fall of Jerusalem in 1187 and the death of the Emperor Frederick Barbarossa on the Third Crusade in 1190, considering the former—and the failure of the crusade—divine punishment for sin and the latter a martyrdom.

=== Ending ===
The (pen)ultimate entry of the Kievan Chronicle is the year 1200 (erroneously named "1199" in the text), which contains a long panegyric praising Rurik Rostislavich (intermittently Grand Prince of Kiev between 1173 and 1210, died 2015), ending with "Amen". However, in the Khlebnikov Codex, the text of the Kievan Chronicle ends in the year 6704 (1196).

There is some disagreement amongst scholars whether the entry of the year 6709 (1201), (Note: В лѣт̑ . ҂s҃ . ѱ҃ . ѳ҃ . начало кнѧжениӕ великаго кнѧзѧ Романа како держєв̑ бывша всеи Роускои земли кнѧзѧ Галичкого, V lět̑ . ҂dz . ps f . načalo knęženiae velikago knęzę Romana kako deržyev̑ byvša vsei Rouskoi zemli knęzę Galičkogo, 'In the year [6709 (1201)] was the beginning of the reign of grand prince Roman, formerly the holder of all the Rus' land, the Prince of Galicia.' Heinrich 1977: "In the year 1201 was the beginning of the reign of Grand Prince Roman, prince of Galič, as autocrat of all Russia." Perfecky 1973: "The beginning of the reign of Great Prince Roman, prince of Halyč, whose domain was the entire Land of Rus'".) which is not found in the Khlebnikov Codex or the Pogodin text, should be considered the final sentence of the Kievan Chronicle (Perfecky 1973, Heinrich 1977), or the first sentence of the Galician–Volhynian Chronicle (earlier scholars such as Bestuzev-Rjumin, A. Galakhov 1863, and A. Shakhmatov 1908). Perfecky stated: 'I believe that [the entry of 6709] and not Roman's quarrel with his father-in-law Prince Rjurik of Kiev under 1195–96 (Hruševs'kyj, Istorija, p. 2) is the last information about Roman in the Kievan Chronicle, of which it is an integral part (or more specifically "abrupt-ending" - to which the chronicler perhaps planned to return or possibly even returned, but that fragment never reached us).'

== Bibliography ==
=== Primary sources ===
- Shakhmatov, Aleksey Aleksandrovich, ed. (1908). Ipat'evskaya letopis' Ипатьевская лѣтопись [The Hypatian Codex]. Complete Collection of Russian Chronicles (PSRL) (in Church Slavic and Russian). Vol. 2 (3rd ed.). Saint Petersburg: Typography of M. A. Aleksandrov / Izbornyk. pp. 285–715.

Translations

- English: Heinrich, Lisa Lynn (1977). The Kievan Chronicle: A Translation and Commentary (PhD diss.). Nashville, Tennessee: Vanderbilt University. ProQuest 7812419
- Ukrainian: Makhnovets, Leonid (1989). Літопис Руський за Іпатським списком [Rus' Chronicle according to the Hypatian Codex] (in Ukrainian). Kyiv: Dnipro. p. 591. ISBN 5-308-00052-2.

=== Literature ===
- Børtnes, Jostein (1989). "The Literature of Old Russia, 988–1730". In Charles Arthur Moser (ed.). The Cambridge History of Russian Literature. Cambridge University Press.
- Garcia de la Puente, Ines (2012). "Gleb of Minsk's Widow: Neglected Evidence on the Rule of a Woman in Rus'ian History?". Russian History. 39 (3): 347–378. doi:10.1163/18763316-03903006. ISSN 0094-288X.
- Hristova, Daniela (2006). "Major Textual Boundary of Linguistic Usage in the Galician-Volhynian Chronicle". Russian History. 33 (2/4): 313–331. doi:10.1163/187633106X00195. JSTOR 24664447.
- Isoaho, Mari H. (2017). "Battle for Jerusalem in Kievan Rus': Igor's Campaign (1185) and the Battle of Hattin (1187)" (PDF). Palaeoslavica. 25 (2): 38–62.
- Jusupović, Adrian (2022). The Chronicle of Halych-Volhynia and Historical Collections in Medieval Rus'. Leiden: Brill. p. 268. ISBN 9789004509306.
- Kloss, Boris (1998). "Predislovie k izdaniyu 1998 g." Предисловие к изданию 1998 г. [Foreword to the 1998 Edition]. Ipat'evskaya letopis' Ипатьевская летопись [The Hypatian Codex]. Complete Collection of Russian Chronicles (PSRL) (in Church Slavic and Russian). Vol. 2 (5th ed.). Moscow: Yazyki russkoy kul'tury / Izbornyk. pp. E–N.
- Ostrowski, Donald (March 1981). "Textual Criticism and the Povest' vremennykh let: Some Theoretical Considerations". Harvard Ukrainian Studies. 5 (1). Harvard Ukrainian Research Institute: 11–31. JSTOR 41035890.
- Pelenski, Jaroslaw (1987). "The Sack of Kiev of 1169: Its Significance for the Succession to Kievan Rus'". Harvard Ukrainian Studies. 11 (3). Harvard Ukrainian Research Institute: 303–316. JSTOR 41036277. Reprinted in Pelenski (1988), The Contest for the Legacy of Kievan Rus'.
- Pelenski, Jaroslaw (1988). "The Contest for the "Kievan Succession" (1155–1175): The Religious-Ecclesiastical Dimension". Harvard Ukrainian Studies. 12/13: 776. JSTOR 41036344. Reprinted in Pelenski (1988), The Contest for the Legacy of Kievan Rus'.
- Perfecky, George A. (1973). The Hypatian Codex Part Two: The Galician–Volynian Chronicle. An annotated translation by George A. Perfecky. Munich: Wilhelm Fink Verlag. OCLC 902306.
- Plokhy, Serhii (2006). The Origins of the Slavic Nations: Premodern Identities in Russia, Ukraine, and Belarus. New York: Cambridge University Press. p. 378. ISBN 978-0-521-86403-9.
- Tolochko, Oleksiy (2007). "On "Nestor the Chronicler"". Harvard Ukrainian Studies. 29 (1). Harvard University: 31–59. JSTOR 41304501.
- Plokhy, Serhii (December 1, 2015). The Gates of Europe: A History of Ukraine. ISBN 9780465050918.
