= Laurentian Codex =

1377 collection of chronicles

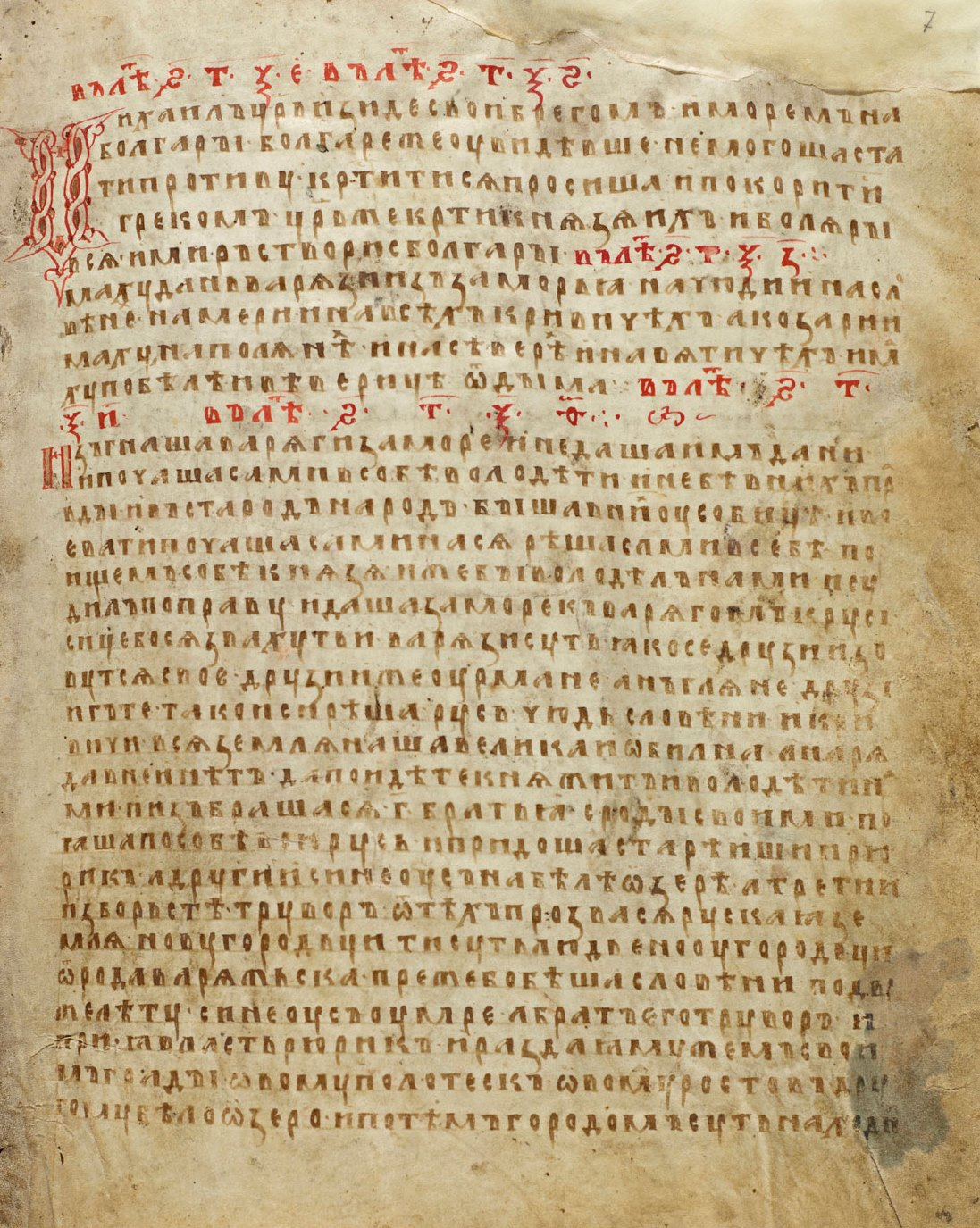
Laurentian copy the Calling of the Varangians

The Laurentian Codex or Laurentian Letopis (Russian: Лаврентьевский список, Лаврентьевская летопись) is a collection of chronicles that includes the oldest extant version of the Primary Chronicle and its continuations, mostly relating the events of the northeastern Rus' principalities of Vladimir-Suzdal.

== Compilation ==
The codex was not only copied by the Nizhegorod monk Laurentius, commissioned by Dionysius of Suzdal in 1377. The original chronicle of events from 1284 to 1305 was a lost codex compiled for the Grand Duke Mikhail of Tver in 1305 that Laurentius re-edited the presentation of Yuri Vsevolodovich, the founder of Nizhny Novgorod, from positive into a negative, partly rehabilitating the role of Tatars. Vasily Komarovich (1976) studied traces of changes within the manuscript and established a hypothesis about differences between Laurentius' version and the lost one of the Tver chronicle.

== Contents ==
The fully scanned Laurentian Codex (click to open PDF)

The Laurentian Codex compiled several codices of the Vladimir chronicles.

- Laurentian text of the Primary Chronicle, which covers events from 852 to the 1110s.
- Laurentian text of the Suzdalian Chronicle or Suzdal'–Vladimirian Chronicle, which covers events from 1111 to 1305

173 leaves of the codex have been preserved, while 12 leaves are lost. Between folios 9 and 10, six leaves are missing about the events of 6406–6429 (898–921); after folio 169, five leaves are missing about the events of 6771–6791 (1263–1283); after folio 170, one leaf is missing about the events of 6796–6802 (1288–1293). The number of lost leaves is estimated based on parallel texts from nearby chronicles; there is also a hypothesis that the last lacuna is associated not with the loss of a leaf, but with an omission in the protograph.

It is the second edition of Nestor's chronicle, which had been already revised in 1116 by Sylvester, Hegumen of the St. Michael Monastery in the village of Vydubychi, under the reign of Prince Vladimir Monomakh, and it is the oldest version known today. The codex is a unique source for the autobiographical chronicle called Instruction of Vladimir Monomakh.

The first part until folio 40 verso was written by an unknown scribe commissioned by Andrew Bogolyubsky. In 1177 it was completed after the assassination of the prince. The second chronicle about Vsevolod the Big Nest continued up to 1193. The third part, which glorified Vsevolod, was composed in 1212 by his son Yuri Vsevolodovich. The Vladimir Chronicles borrowed from sources of the Southern Rus', especially from Pereiaslav, since Vladimir princes regarded the city as part of their patrimony.

The compilation referred to various periods until 1305, but the years 898–922, 1263–1283 and 1288–1294 had been omitted for reasons of censorship, and quite likely under supervision of Dionysios, Metropolitan of Kyiv. The revision was done under great rush and another hand in the manuscript proves, that Laurentius' work was assisted by a second scribe whose hand can be found on the later added folios 157, 167, and on the verso side of folio 161.

The text of the Suzdal'–Vladimirian Chronicle shows strong similarities with that of the Kievan Chronicle found in the Hypatian Codex, but also some remarkable differences. Jaroslaw Pelenski (1988) made the following comparison (italics by Pelenski):

Kievan Chronicle	Suzdal'–Vladimirian Chronicle
The same year [1155] Prince Andrej went from his father from Vyšhorod to Suzdal' without his father's permission, and he took from Vyšhorod the Icon of the Blessed Mother of God which was brought from Cesarjagrad on the same ship with the Pirogošča [Icon]. And he had it framed in thirty-grivny-weight-of-gold, besides silver, and precious stones, and large pearls, and having thus adorned [the Icon], he placed it in his own church of the Mother of God in Vladimir.	The same year [1155] Prince Andrej went from his father to Suzdal', and he brought with him the Icon of the Blessed Mother of God which was brought from Cesarjagrad on the same ship with the Pirogošča [Icon]. And he had it framed in thirty-grivny-weight-of-gold, besides silver, and precious stones, and large pearls, and having thus adorned [the Icon], he placed it in his own church in Vladimir.

Pelenski observed that the Kievan Chronicle framed Andrey's actions as improper and illegal, whereas the Suzdal'–Vladimirian Chronicle omitted any such references. This is in line with how the Kievan is generally ambivalent or openly critical of Andrey's reign, whilst the Suzdal'–Vladimirian is positive and complimentary of his actions.

== Provenance ==
The manuscript was acquired by the famous Count Musin-Pushkin in 1792 and subsequently presented to the Russian National Library in St Petersburg.

== See also ==
- Solar eclipse of 1 May 1185

== Sources ==
- Pelenski, Jaroslaw (1988). "The Contest for the "Kievan Succession" (1155–1175): The Religious-Ecclesiastical Dimension". Harvard Ukrainian Studies. 12/13: 776. JSTOR 41036344.
- Father Laurentius. "Saint-Petersburg, Rossiyskaya natsional'naya biblioteka, Ms. F.п.IV.2". Laurentian Codex with a collection of chronicles and the oldest version of the Primary Chronicle (1377).
- Izdanie Archeografičeskoy Kommissiy, ed. (1872). Повесть Временных Лет по Лаврентьевскому списку [Tale of bygone years according to the Laurentian codex (facsimile)]. Saint Petersburg: Publisher of the Imperial Academy of Science.

== Critical edition ==
- Лаврентьевская летопись [Laurentian chronicles]. Полное Собрание Русских Литописей [Complete edition of Russian chronicles]. Vol. 1. Saint Petersburg: Academy of Science (SSSR). 1926–1928.

== Translations ==
- "Laurentian Codex completed in 1377". Digitisation of the Laurentian Codex, including transliteration and translation into modern Russian of each page, with an introduction in English (in Church Slavic and Russian). Saint-Petersburg: National Library of Russia. 2012.
- Hazzard Cross, Samuel; Sherbowitz-Wetzor, Olgerd, eds. (1953) [1377]. The Russian Primary chronicle: Laurentian text. The Mediaeval Academy of America.
