= Volyn Short Chronicle =

The Volyn Short Chronicle (Ukrainian: Воли́нський коро́ткий літо́пис, romanized: Volynsjkyj korotkyj litopys) is the conventional name of a Lithuanian chronicle in Ruthenian that is part of the Supraśl Manuscript of the early 16th century, found in the Supraśl Orthodox Monastery (Supraśl, now Białystok County in Poland). It is currently kept in the Russian State Archive of Ancient Acts (РГАДА/RGADA) in Moscow (ф. 181, оп. 1, № 21, 26). Previously, it was also known as the Short Kyiv Chronicle or Short Kyivan Chronicle.

== Name ==
When Mikhail Andreevich Obolensky first published the text of the chronicle in 1836, he called it the "Abridged" or "Short Kievan (Kyivan) Chronicle". But because the parts of the text that provide unique, original materials are entirely devoted to Volyn, subsequent scholars have renamed it Volyn Short Chronicle instead.

== Contents ==
The Volyn Short Chronicle has 74 folios (leaves, sheets). Mikałaj Ułaščyk (1975, 1980) divided the chronicle into three parts:

- The first part, from л. 1 to л. 67 об., is titled "The origin of the Rus' princes of the Rus' principality." It starts from 862, and ends with the marriage of Alexander of Lithuania and Helena of Moscow (15 February 1495). It is a brief description of events in the lands of Kievan Rus', and what the chronicler deemed the most important events of the past of other states.
- The second part, from л. 67 об. to л. 71, contains news items that are almost entirely related to the Grand Duchy of Lithuania and Volhynia (Volyn), in particular the struggle with the Tatars of the Horde in 1495–1515. The last entry in this part is the siege and capture of Smolensk by the Muscovite troops of Vasily Ivanovich.
- The third and last part, from л. 72 to л. 74 об., is devoted to a panegyric which glories Konstantin Ivanovich Ostrozhsky (grand hetman of Lithuania, 1497–1530), and his victory over the Muscovite army at the Battle of Orsha (1514). After that, л. 74 об. ends with a record of the visit of grand duke Sigismund II Augustus of Lithuania to the Suprasl Monastery in 1544.

== Composition ==
According to the Encyclopedia of Ukraine (1989), the text is primarily composed from Novgorodian sources. According to Mytsyk (2003), the chronicle was probably created by a priest of the cathedral in Volodymyr in Volyn, who was close to bishop Vassian of Volodymyr.

Unlike earlier chronicles such as the 12th-century Kievan Chronicle, its focus is not the so-called "Rus' Land" (mentioned only twice), but the "Volhynian Land", which is treated on equal terms with the "Lithuanian Land". The author's interests remain squarely focused on what happened in Volhynia and Podolia in the 15th century. In the second part, the events of 1495 to 1497 stand out: the author used both his own impressions and the testimony of other eyewitnesses to write about the 1495 election of Macarius Chort as metropolitan of Kiev, Galicia and all Rus', and his subsequent death at the hands of the Tatars in 1497. The praise to Ostrozhsky in the third part would not have been added until after his victory over the Muscovite troops in the Battle of Orsha (1514).

== See also ==
- Praise to Vytautas
- Tale of Podolia

== Literature ==
- Chyzhevsky, Dmytro; Zhukovsky, Arkadii (1989). "Kyiv Chronicle". Internet Encyclopedia of Ukraine. Vol. 2.
- Plokhy, Serhii (2006). The Origins of the Slavic Nations: Premodern Identities in Russia, Ukraine, and Belarus (PDF). New York: Cambridge University Press. pp. 110–111. ISBN 978-0-521-86403-9. Archived (PDF) from the original on 6 June 2011.
- Ulashchik, N.N., ed. (1980a) [1975]. Bilorusjko-lytovsjki litopysy Білорусько-литовські літописи [The Belarusian–Lithuanian Chronicles]. Complete Collection of Rus' Chronicles (PSRL) (in Russian, Ukrainian, and Belarusian). Vol. 32, 35. Moscow: Nauka / Izbornyk. p. 306.
  - Ulashchik, N.N., ed. (1980b). "Волинський короткий літопис" [Volyn Short Chronicle]. Bilorusjko-lytovsjki litopysy Білорусько-литовські літописи [The Belarusian–Lithuanian Chronicles]. Complete Collection of Rus' Chronicles (PSRL) (in Russian, Ukrainian, and Belarusian). Vol. 35. Moscow: Nauka / Izbornyk. pp. 118–127. Archived from the original on 18 October 2014.
- Kovalsky, Mykola Pavlovich; Mytsyk, Yuri Andriyovych (1985). "Украинские летописи" [Ukrainian chronicles]. Вопросы истории (in Russian) (10). Nauka: 81–94.
- Mytsyk, Yuri Andriyovych (2003). "Волинський короткий літопис" [Volyn Short Chronicle]. Encyclopedia of History of Ukraine (in Ukrainian). Institute of History of Ukraine. Archived from the original on 27 March 2013.
