= Slutsk Chronicle =

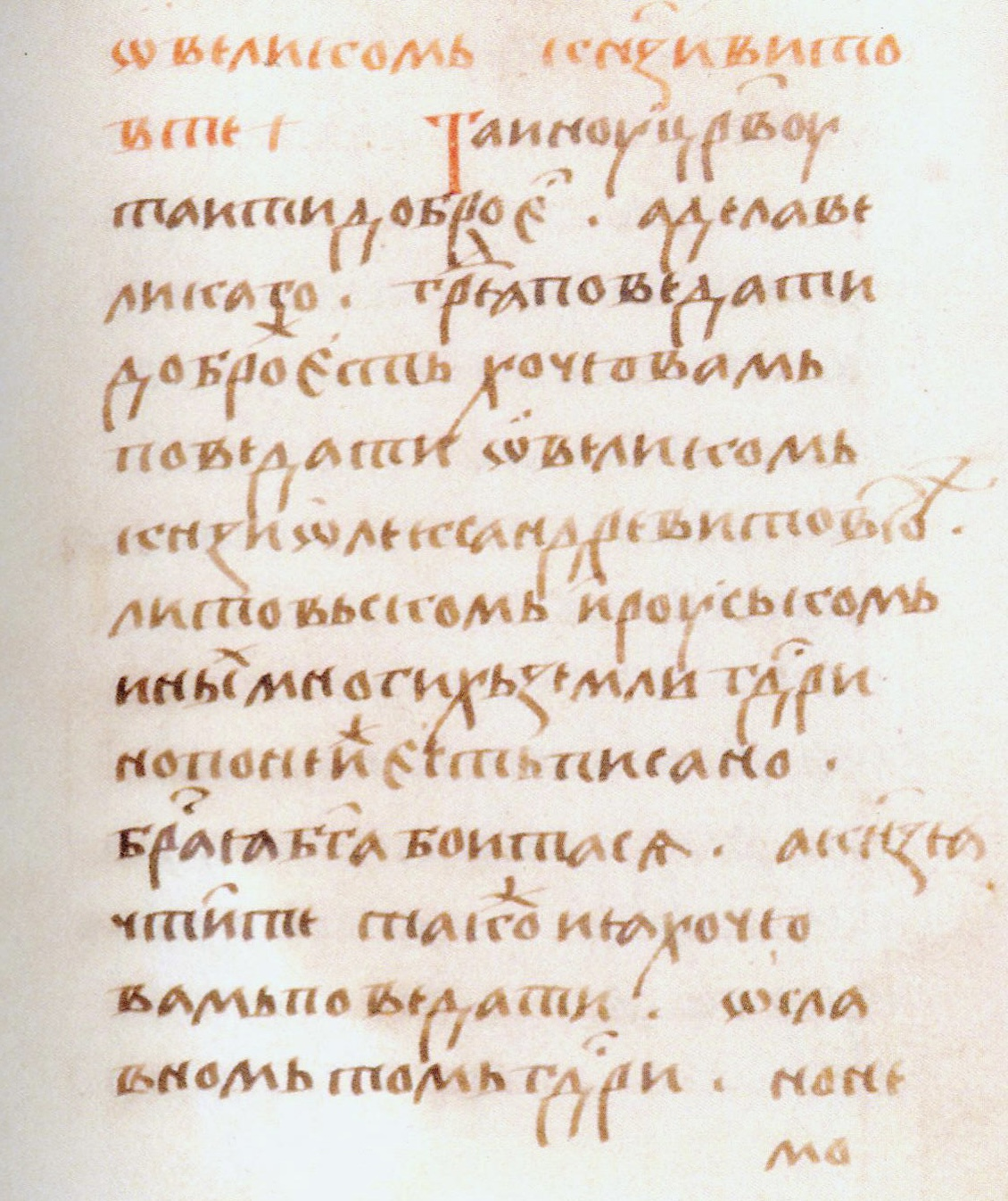
Slutsk Chronicle л.51. (fol.51r): opening of the Praise to Vytautas: [Похвала] o великомь князи Витовте. Таину цареву таити добро есть, a дела великаго господаря поведати добро жь есть. Хочю вамь поведати o великомь князи Олександре ВитовтЂ литовьскомь и руськомь, иных многих земли господари. Но по неи же есть писано: «Братя, бога боитася, a князя чтите». Такожь и я хочю вамь поведати o славномь томь господари, но не мо..." (Note: "Praise to Grand Prince Vytautas. It is good to keep a tsar's secrets; but it is likewise good to tell the deeds of a great sovereign. I want to tell you about the great Prince Alexander Vytautas of Lithuania and Ruthenia, lord of many lands. But it is written: 'Brothers, fear God and honour the prince.' I also want to tell you about that glorious lord, but I cannot...")

PSRL Volume 17 (1907), columns 85–124.

PSRL vol. 35 (1980), pp. 68–84.

The Slutsk Chronicle, (Note: Taraškievica and Belarusian: Слуцкі летапіс, romanized: Slucki letapis. Ukrainian: Слу́цький літо́пис, romanized: Sluckyj litopys. Russian: Слуцкая летопись, romanized: Slutskaja letopis'.) also known as the Uvarov Manuscript, (Note: Pre-1918 Russian: Уваровскій списокъ, romanized: Uvarovskij spisok". Ukrainian: Ува́ровський список, romanized: Uvarovsjkyj spysok. Also known as the Uvarovskyi Chronicle.) is an early modern Belarusian-Lithuanian chronicle from the 16th century.

== Provenance ==
The manuscript was purchased by ethnographer I. P. Sakharov from his teacher Uspensky, who had acquired the manuscript from a village priest. Sakharov wrote that Uspensky was "from Lithuania", which in early-19th-century terminology referred to all of western and central Belarus, except for Lithuania itself; therefore, it's possible he came from the Slutsky Uyezd. Some of Sakharov's notes on the manuscript are erroneous, such as that he mistakenly thought it was the Supraśl Manuscript (which was considered lost at the time).

In 1847, the manuscript passed into the collection of archaeologist Aleksey Uvarov (hence the alternative name "Uvarov Manuscript"). The manuscript is currently preserved as No. 1381 (153) as part of the A. S. Uvarov Collection in the Manuscripts Department of the State Historical Museum, located in Moscow.

== Description of the manuscript ==
The manuscript currently has 106 sheets (folios), except for the first pages of the manuscript, which are missing. The first 5 sheets are defective, and were later restored on strips of paper glued to the remains of the sheets, on one side, and then numbered. The recto side of the sheets have been numbered in Arabic numbers in 19th-century handwriting in the lower right corner. Moreover, both sides of the sheets have also been numbered with Arabic numerals in on the upper margins. In the lower margin of the 6th sheet, someone added a note in 19th-century handwriting: "The pages of the entire sheets of the chronicle are designated with Arabic numerals by me on 14 January 1839." The signature that follows has been erased.

The text was written in semi-uncial script the mid-16th century in Early Ruthenian, in its Old Belarusian variety. The margins of the manuscript contain some information about the history of the Princes of Slutsk. On this basis, it has commonly been assumed that the manuscript was created in the city of Slutsk (or Sluck, originally Sluchesk), in modern-day Belarus. This is where it got its name Slutsk Chronicle from.

== Contents ==
The chronicle consists of two parts. The first part (fol. 1r–76r) focuses on the activities of Vytautas the Great. It also tells about the Grand Dukes of Lithuania Algirdas (Olgerd), Kęstutis (Keystut), Jogaila (later Władysław II Jagiełło), the Prince of Kiev Skirgaila (son of Algirdas), the Battle of Blue Waters in 1362/3, and the Battle of the Vorskla River (1399). The Tale about Podolia is found on folio 28v–49r (л.28об.–л.49.). There is information about Gregory Tsamblak (the elected but anathematised Metropolitan of Kiev from 1414 to 1419/20), and about how Prince Dashko Ostrovsky captured Kremenets and freed Švitrigaila (another son of Algirdas) from prison in 1418. The text of the Praise to Vytautas is situated on folio 51r–58v (л.51–л.58об.).

The second, smaller part (fol.76v–106r) is a concise history of Kievan Rus' from 970 (the reign of Volodimer' I in Veliky Novgorod) to 1237 (the Mongol invasion of Kievan Rus'). The title of the second part reads "Летописецъ o великом князи московскомъ, како далеки от роду Володимирова" ("Chronicler of the Grand Prince of Moscow, how far removed from the family of Volodimir'."). Fol.79r adds a subtitle: "Летописец от великого князя Володимеря киевьского" ("Chronicler from the Grand Prince Volodimer' of Kiev'.").

== Gallery ==
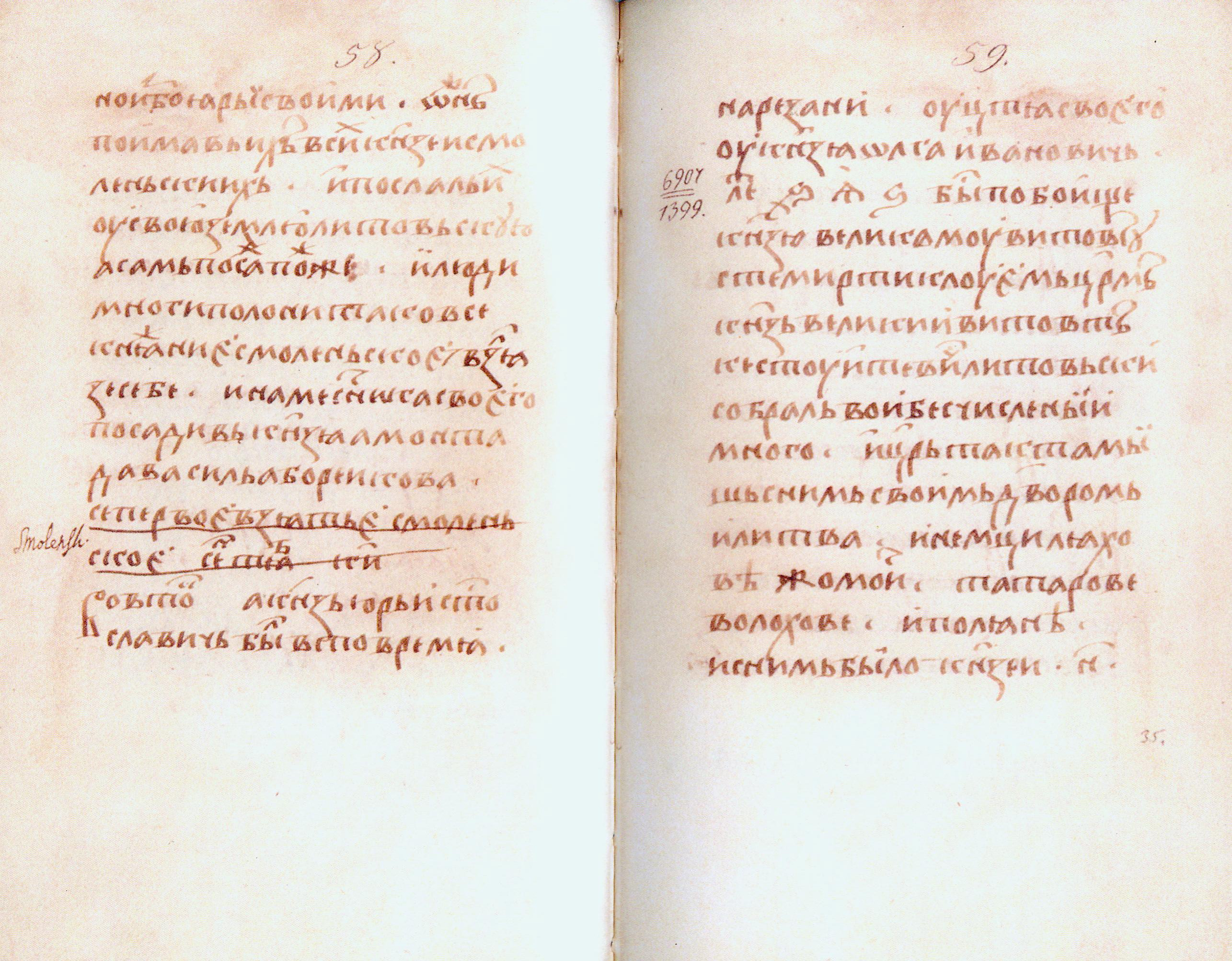
л.34об. – л.35

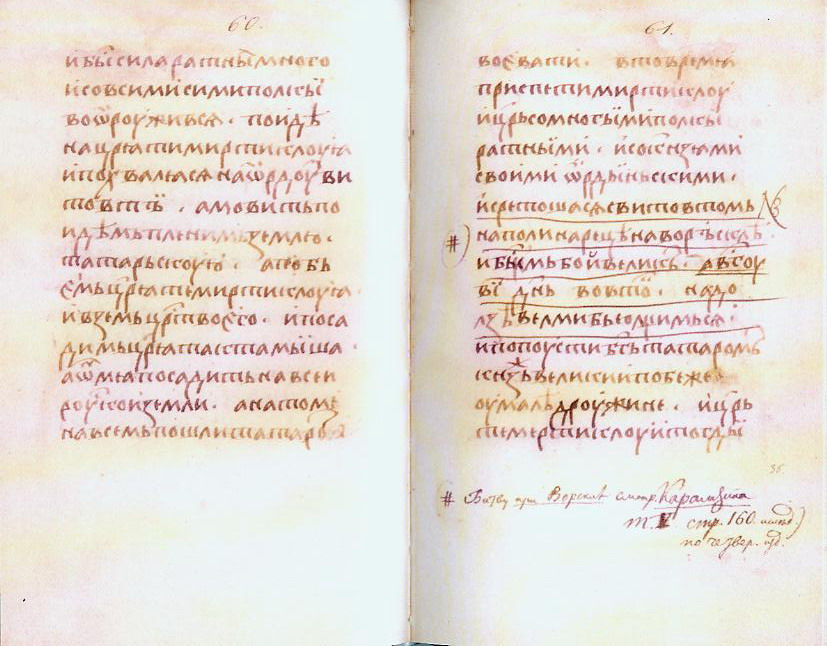
л.35об. – л.36

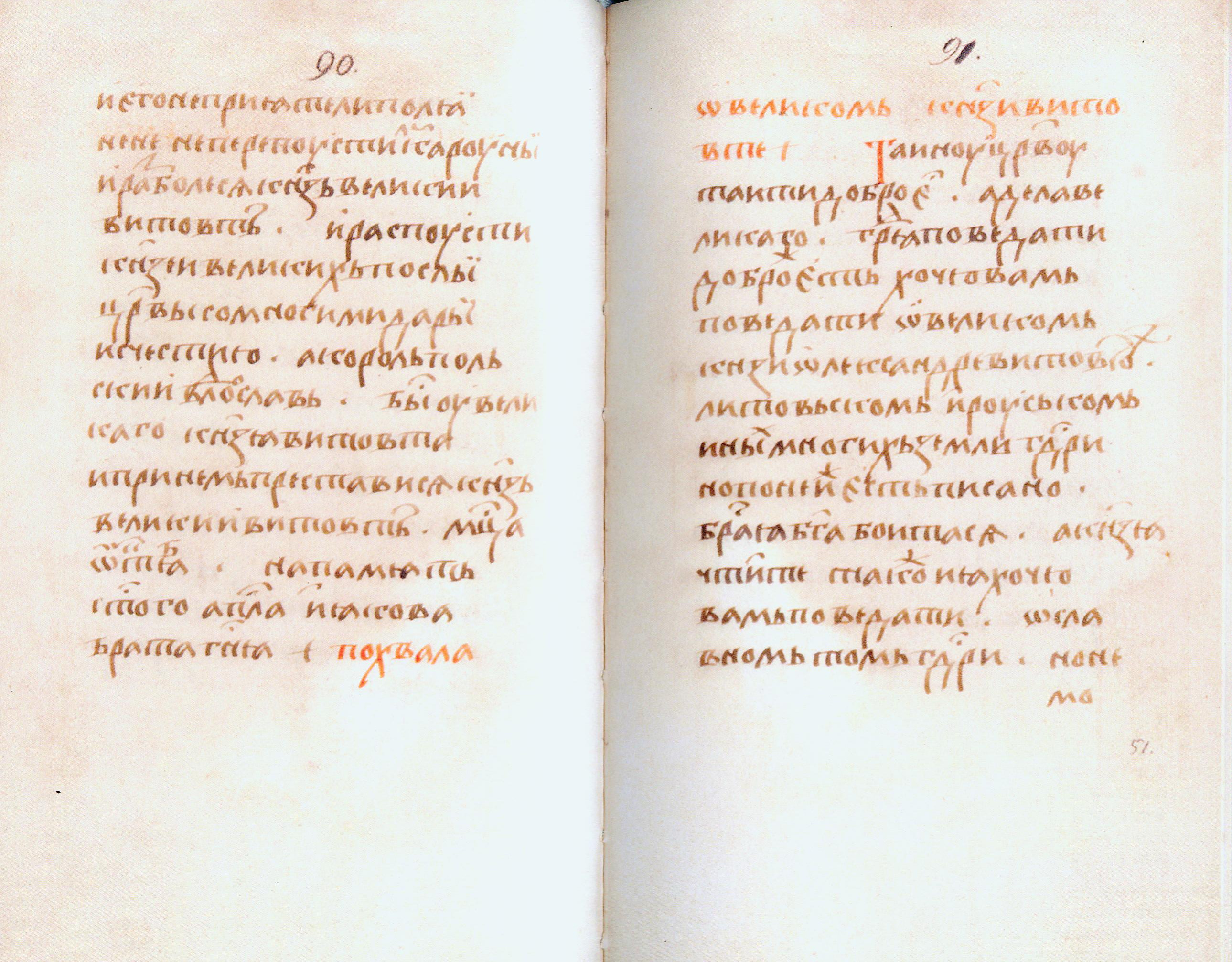
л.50об. – л.51, containing the Praise to Vytautas' opening

== Bibliography ==
=== Critical editions ===
- Shakhmatov, Aleksey Aleksandrovich; Ptaszycki, Stanisław, eds. (1907). Zapadnorusskie letopisi Западнорусские летописи [Western Rus' Chronicles]. Complete Collection of Rus' Chronicles (PSRL) (in Belarusian, Russian, and Ukrainian). Vol. 17. Saint Petersburg: Typography of Aleksandrov. pp. 59–78. (in Volume 32 and 35 rebranded Belarusian-Lithuanian Chronicles). The text of the Slutsk Chronicle is printed on columns 85–124; pages 59–78.
- Ulashchik, N.N., ed. (1980c). Bilorusjko-lytovsjki litopysy: Slucjkyj litopys Білорусько-литовські літописи: Слуцький літопис [The Belarusian–Lithuanian Chronicles: The Slutsk Chronicle]. Complete Collection of Rus' Chronicles (PSRL) (in Belarusian). Vol. 35. Moscow: Nauka / Izbornyk. pp. 68–84.
- Слуцкая летопись. Виленская летопись. Летопись Археологического общества // Гісторыя Беларусі IX—XVIII стагоддзяў. Першакрыніцы.

=== Literature ===
- Ulashchik, N.N., ed. (1980b). "Слуцкая летопись (иначе Уваровская) (опис)" [Slutsk Chronicle (alias Uvarov) (description)]. Bilorusjko-lytovsjki litopysy Білорусько-литовські літописи [The Belarusian–Lithuanian Chronicles]. Complete Collection of Rus' Chronicles (PSRL) (in Russian). Vol. 35. Moscow: Nauka / Izbornyk. p. 7. Archived from the original on 8 August 2025.
- Mytsyk, Yuri Andriyovych (2010). "Слуцький літопис" [Slutsk Chronicle]. Encyclopedia of History of Ukraine (in Ukrainian). Vol. 9. Kyiv: Institute of History of Ukraine. p. 664. Archived from the original on 22 August 2025.
- Slipushko, Oksana (2022). "Lietuvos ir Rusios kronikos mąstymo paradigma vėlyvaisiais viduramžiais / Lithuanian-Ruthenian Chronicle Paradigm of Thinking in the Late Middle Ages". LOGOS. 113: 18–25. doi:10.24101/logos.2022.69.
- Sushytsky, Feoktyst (Teoktyst) Petrovych, Західно-руські літописи як памятки літератури [Western Rus' chronicles as monuments of literature]. Кiev, 1921. Chapter 1. (in Ukrainian).
- Chamyarytskyi V. A., Беларускія летапісы як помнікі літаратуры [Belarusian chronicles as monuments of literature]. Minsk, 1969. (in Belarusian).
- Слуцький літопис Slutsk Chronicle // Legal Encyclopedia : [in 6 vols.] / ed. col.: Yu. S. Shemshuchenko (res. ed.) [et al.]. Kyiv: Ukrainian Encyclopedia named after M. P. Bazhan, 2003. Vol. 5: P — P. 736 p. ISBN 966-7492-05-2. (in Ukrainian).
