= Nikifor Manuscript =

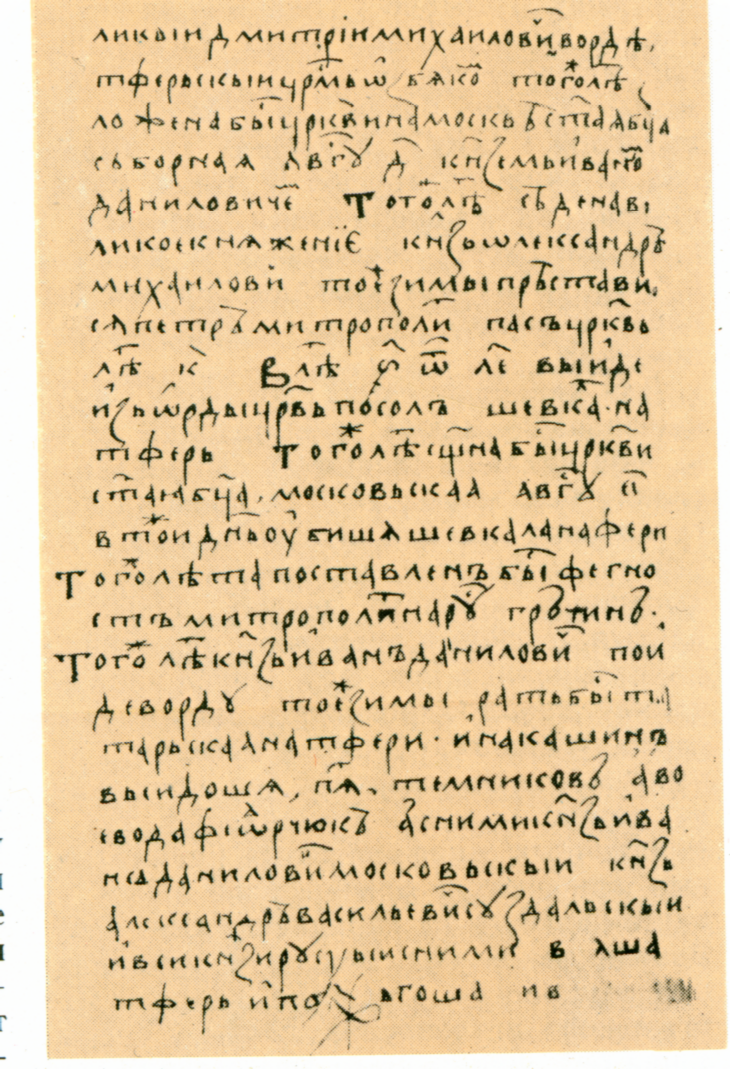
Photoscan of a page of the Nikifor Manuscript from the last quarter of the 15th century (c. 1475~1499).

The Nikifor manuscript or Nikifor Chronicle (Note: Taraškievica and Belarusian: Нікіфараўскі летапіс, romanized: Nikifaraŭski letapis. Ukrainian: Никифорівський літопис, romanized: Nykyforivsjkyj litopys. Russian: Никифоровская летопись, romanized: Nikiforovskaya letopis'.) is a monument of the first redaction of the Belarusian-Lithuanian Chronicles, preserved as part of a collection from the last quarter of the 15th century. The chronicle was previously owned by Nikolai Nikiforov, from whom it takes its name. The collection is now kept in the Manuscript Department of the Library of the Russian Academy of Sciences in Saint Petersburg.

== Characteristics ==
The chronicle is in fours, bound in leather-covered boards, 351 leaves in total; the paper is thick, yellowish, written in half-skin, mostly in the 15th century. Non-chronicle texts in the collection are written in 16th, 17th and 18th centuries, brown ink. There are about ten filigrees. Among them are a bunch of grapes – Nikolai Likhachev has a similar sign under No. 1075, dated 1464; a bull's head with a cross under the chin – No; 1124 – 1469 year; a bull's head, above it a crown – № 1155 – 1477 year; a bull's head, between the horns a rod with three oval leaves – № 1179 – 1491 year.

The sheets are numbered in the upper right corner in pencil. In the lower margin, notebooks are numbered in the Old Church Slavonic alphabet; notebooks are marked (in the sequence in which they were preserved): 25, 14, 27, 26, 29, 38. In the margins are notes, mostly in 16th-century Belarusian cursive, but also in Polish and Latin; in the lower margin of the first leaf is a note in 17th- or early 18th-century handwriting: "Monasterii Minensis s. Spriti", indicating that the chronicle once belonged to the Holy Spirit Monastery of Minsk. The bottom of folios 241–243 and the upper corner of folio 245 are torn or decayed. In some places, the text runs along the very edge of the leaves.

== Contents ==
Because the sheets are mixed up, the chronicle does not begin in the order of the sheets, but in the order of the (chronological) sequence of events:

- Religious texts (sheets 1—65).
- A collection of the word of St Basil from the Apostles, bless Father, the word of St Basil from the Apostles (sheets 66—165).
- Apocryphal stories about the Virgin Mary, etc.. (sheets 166—203).
- Chronicle of the Great Kingdoms, since when did the kingdom begin, and the Rus' reign of our holy father Nikifor, Patriarch of Constantinople, chronicler in brief (sheets 204—211).
- Chronicler of the Rus' tsars (sheets 211—225).
- Nikifor Chronicle (sheets 226—267).
- Chapters of the punishment of the kingdom of Basil, king of the Greeks, and his son (sheets 269—290).
- Excerpts from teachings (sheets 290—329).
- Rules of Cyril, Metropolitan of Rus' (sheet 330).
- Teaching (sheets 331—333).
- Interpretation of sacred texts (sheets 334—338).
- Excerpt from the Description of Jerusalem (sheets 339—348).
- Excerpt from the Large Catechism (sheets 349—350).

It begins with the words "Andrey, Kuchkovichi were beaten, and the other boyars behind Yuryev were taken and beaten" and ends with a description of the fight between Svidrigailo Olgerdovich and Sigismund Keistutovich: "After that battle, 3 weeks later, the great prince Zhidimont gathered all his Lithuanian forces and sent his son Prince Mikhail to Russia. And Prince Michael came...". There is no title in the Nikifor Chronicle.

== Studies ==
The description of the chronicle was made in 1898 by Sergey Belokurov], who also published the chronicle. When publishing it, Belokurov filled in the missing places of the Nikifor Chronicle with the Supraśl Manuscript, in the edition of Ignatiy Danilovich. Following Danilovich, Belokurov printed excerpts from the Supraśl Chronicle in Latin script and gave it the same title: "A Selection of the Chronicle in Brief".

In 1903, the chronicle was described by Vsevolod Sreznevsky, and in 1963 it was described in more detail by the authors of the Description of the Manuscript Department of the Library of the Academy of Sciences. In 1980, the Nikiforov Chronicle was published by Mikałaj Ułaščyk in volume 35 of the Complete Collection of Rus' Chronicles (PSRL).

== Literature ==
- Vyacheslav Antonovych Chemerytskyi, Нікіфараўскі летапіс [Nikifor Chronicle]. Вялікае Княства Літоўскае. Энцыклапедыя у 3 т.[Grand Duchy of Lithuania. Encyclopaedia in 3 Volumes]. Minsk: БелЭн, 2005. — Т. 2: Кадэцкі корпус — Яцкевіч. — С. 357. — 788 с. — ISBN 985-11-0378-0.
- Ulashchik, N.N., ed. (1980b). "Никифоровская летопись (опис)" [Nikifor Chronicle (description)]. Bilorusjko-lytovsjki litopysy Білорусько-литовські літописи [The Belarusian–Lithuanian Chronicles]. Complete Collection of Rus' Chronicles (PSRL) (in Russian). Vol. 35. Moscow: Nauka / Izbornyk. p. 4. Archived from the original on 8 August 2025.
