= Chronicle of Avraamka =

PSRL vol. 16 (1889), containing Fol. 1r – 437r, published as Collection of chronicles, called the Chronicle of Avraamka.

PSRL vol. 17 (1907), containing Fol. 437r – 450v, here titled "Vilnius Manuscript: Chronicle of Avraamka".

PSRL vol. 35 (1980), containing Fol. 437r – 450v, here titled Chronicle of Vilnius.

The Chronicle of Avraamka (Note: Taraškievica and Belarusian: Летапіс Аўрамкі, romanized: Letapis Aŭramki. Lithuanian: Avramkos metraštis. Ukrainian: Літопис Авраамки, romanized: Litopys Avraamky. Russian: Летопись Авраамки, romanized: Letopis' Avraamki.) (also known as the Vilnius Manuscript (Note: Taraškievica and Belarusian: Віленскі спісак, romanized: Vilenski spisak. Ukrainian: Віленський список, romanized: Vilensjkyj spysok. Russian: Виленский список, romanized: Vilenskij spisok. Lithuanian: Vilniaus Rankraštis or Vilniaus nuorašas. Or: Taraškievica and Belarusian: Віленскі зборнік, romanized: Vilenski zbornik. Ukrainian: Віленський збірник, romanized: Vilensjkyj zbirnyk. Russian: Виленский сборник, romanized: Vilenskij sbornik.)) is a collection of Rus' chronicles compiled in 1495 by the scribe Avraamka (also rendered Abraham) at the instruction of Joseph I (secular name Ioann Bolgarinovich), then Bishop of Smolensk and later Metropolitan of Kiev, Galicia, and All Rus'. Written in the Ruthenian language used in the Grand Duchy of Lithuania, the compilation preserves texts from various periods. The final section — frequently studied and published separately — is commonly referred to as the Vilnius Chronicle. (Note: Taraškievica and Belarusian: Віленскі летапіс, romanized: Vilenski letapis. Lithuanian: Vilniaus kronika. Ukrainian: Віленський літопис, romanized: Vilensjkyj litopys. Russian: Виленская летопись, romanized: Vilenskaja letopis'.) The work is often regarded as one of the oldest surviving chronicle compiled in Lithuania.

== Provenance and critical editions ==
The Vilnius Manuscript was found in Polotsk by Alexander Viktorovich Rachinsky, who donated it to the Vilnius Public Library. (Note: As the Vilnius Public Library (Lithuanian: Vilniaus viešoji biblioteka) operated from 1867 to 1915, but the manuscript was already removed from it in 1866, it most likely was initially preserved in the Museum of Antiquities in Vilnius (Lithuanian: Vilniaus senienų muziejus, which was founded in 1855, and incorporated into the Vilnius Public Library in 1867).) In 1866, the manuscript was transferred to the Imperial Archaeographic Commission for publication. The text of Fol. 1r – 437r of the manuscript was first published as the Collection of chronicles, called the Chronicle of Avraamka (Note: Pre-1918 Russian: Лѣтописный сборникъ, именуемый лѣтописью Авраамки.) in volume 16 of the Complete Collection of Rus' Chronicles (PSRL) in 1889. In PSRL Volume 17 (1907), the text of Fol. 437r – 450v was published separately as "Vilnius Manuscript: Chronicle of Avraamka", along with other works labelled "Northwestern Rus' Chronicles". In PSRL volume 35 (1980), the last part was reprinted as the Vilnius Manuscript or Chronicle of Vilnius, in a collection of Belarusian-Lithuanian Chronicles.

The Vilnius Manuscript is preserved as "F. 22–49" in the Wroblewski Library of the Lithuanian Academy of Sciences in Vilnius (previously known as the Library of the Academy of Sciences of the Lithuanian SSR). It is the only copy of the Lithuanian Chronicles preserved in Lithuania.

== Description of contents ==
The manuscript has 450 folios (sheets, leaves) in total. Folios 1 to 435 are written in a clear semi-uncial script from the late 15th to early 16th centuries, while fol. 436–450 are written in a smaller semi-uncial script, almost half the size of the previous one.

- Fol. 1r – 313v is occupied by a chronograph, with the inclusion of short messages about the Christianisation of the Bulgarians. This is considered the Chronicle of Avraamka proper, which originally ended in the year 6977 [1469], although some later copies have differing continuations.
- Fol. 314r – 365r is occupied by a chronograph titled "Начало Рустіи земли" (Nachalo Rustiy zemly, "The Beginning of the Rustian Land", meaning Rus', Ruthenia, or Russia), covering the years 6453 [945] to 6496 [988].
- Fol. 365r – 437r begin with a list of Rus' princes [Сице родословятся великыи князи Рустіи], and end with a report on events during the reign of Vasily II of Moscow and a list of his sons, and the Tale of the Bishop Arseni of Tver.
- Fol. 437r – 450v contain the Chronicle of Vilnius, with information on the history of the Grand Duchy of Lithuania. The last folio, 450v, is partially illegible. The manuscript breaks off in the middle of a sentence at the beginning of the Tale about Podolia.

The Chronicle of Avraamka is a complex chronicle and literary compilation. It was named after Avraamka, a White Ruthenian (Belarusian) scribe of the late 15th century. Apart from the Vilnius Manuscript — the only one where the note with Avraamka's name has been preserved, versions of the chronicle are contained in the Synodal, Tolstovsky, Pogodinsky, Tikhanskoy manuscripts, and the Supraśl Manuscript.

Various manuscripts of Avraamka's chronicle begin with a chronograph dating back to the times of the Byzantine emperors Leo III and Constantine V, based on the text of Paley, followed by the edited text of the Novgorod Chronicle, based on a version of the Novgorod Fourth Chronicle, close to the Rogozh Chronicler and supplemented by the Abridged Chronicle. One part, from the beginning of the 14th century to 1446, is very close to the Novgorod Fifth Chronicle. The part of the text from 1446 to 1469 again approaches the Novgorod Fourth Chronicle, but, unlike it, contains a number of unique reports, mainly of Novgorodian-Pskovian origin. As a rule, the copies of the Chronicle of Avraamka differ in the part after 1469 [6977].

After the Chronicle of Avraamka, the Vilnius Manuscript contains articles of legal, genealogical and chronological content, similar to the articles of the Commission manuscript (Komissionyy) of the Novgorod First Chronicle, an excerpt from the Novgorod Fourth Chronicle for 945–988, Avraamka's own colophon about the conclusion of this manuscript in 1495, followed by the text of the Chronicle of Vilnius, which belongs to the Belarusian-Lithuanian Chronicles. According to Boris Kloss (2000), it is more likely that Avraamka of Smolensk was only responsible for rewriting the last part of the manuscript, the Chronicle of Vilnius (fol. 437r – 450v).

== Bibliography ==
=== Primary sources ===
- Лѣтописный сборникъ, именуемый лѣтописью Авраамки, Complete Collection of Rus' Chronicles (PSRL), Volume 16, Saint Petersburg, 1889. (in Russian) (editio princeps)
  - pp. 10–121: critical edition of Fol. 1r – 313v, until the year 6977 [1469].
  - pp. 122–139: critical edition of Fol. 314r – 365r, from the year 6453 [945] to 6496 [988].
  - pp. 140–169: critical edition of Fol. 365r – 437r, with miscellaneous lists and reports of events.
  - p. 169: colophon of Avraamka in the year 7003 [1495].
- Виленскій списокъ. Лѣтопись Авраамки. PSRL. Volume 17. Saint Petersburg. 1907. pp. 113–119. (critical edition of Fol. 437r – 450v, containing the Chronicle of Vilnius).
  - Reprinted in 2000 in Moscow, with an introduction by Boris Kloss.
- Ulashchik, N.N., ed. (1980d). Bilorusjko-lytovsjki litopysy: Vilensjkyj litopys Білорусько-литовські літописи: Віленський літопис [The Belarusian–Lithuanian Chronicles: The Chronicle of Vilnius]. Complete Collection of Rus' Chronicles (PSRL) (in Belarusian). Vol. 35. Moscow: Nauka / Izbornyk. pp. 85–90. (critical edition of Fol. 437r – 450v, containing the Chronicle of Vilnius).

=== Literature ===
- Ukrainian Soviet Encyclopedia: in 12 volumes / ed. by M. P. Bazhan; editorial board: O. K. Antonov et al. — 2nd edition. — Kyiv: Main Editorial Office of the Ukrainian Soviet Encyclopedia, 1974–1985.
- Bobrov, A. G., Новгородские летописи XV века. ["Novgorod Chronicles of the 15th Century"]. Saint Petersburg, 2001.
- Бугославский Г. О. [Bugoslavskij, G. O.], смолянине Авраамке и его летописи конца XV в., также несколько слов о смоленском епископе Иосифе Болгариновиче ["Avraamka of Smolensk and his chronicles of the late 15th century, as well as a few words about Bishop Joseph Bolgarinovich of Smolensk"]. «Смоленские епархиальные ведомости» [Smolensk Diocesan Gazette], 1900, № 5;
- Kloss, Boris M. (2000) [1889], Летописный сборник, именуемый летописью Авраамки [A collection of chronicles called the Abraham Chronicle] (in Russian), vol. PSRL Volume 16, Moscow
- Kovalsky N. P., Mytsyk Yu. A., Украинские летописи. ["Ukrainian chronicles"]. «Вопросы истории» [Questions of History], 1985, № 10.
- Lur'e, Ya. S.; Авраамка. In book: Словарь книжников и книжности Древней Руси [Dictionary of Scribes and Bookishness of Ancient Rus], Issue 2, Part 1. Leningrad, 1988.
- Mašanauskienė, Miglė, ed. (2022). Recording History: Lithuania's Documentary Heritage in the International and National Registers of the UNESCO Memory of the World Programme (PDF). Translated by Kondratas, Ramūnas. Secretariat of the Lithuanian National Commission for UNESCO. ISBN 978-9955-718-11-6.
- Obolensky, M. A. (ed.), Супрасльская рукопись, содержащая Новгородскую и Киевскую сокращенные летописи [Suprasl'skaia rukopis', soderzhashchaia Novgorodskuiu i Kievskuiu sokrashchennye letopisi, "The Supraśl Manuscript, containing the shortened Novgorodian and Kievan chronicles"] (1836). Moscow.
- Priselkov, Mikhail A., Летописание Западной Украины и Белоруссии [Chronicles of Western Ukraine and Belarus]. In book.: Priselkov, Mikhail A., История русского летописания XI—XV вв. [History of Rus' Chronicle Writing in the 11th–15th Centuries]. Saint Petersburg, 1996.
- Shakhmatov, Aleksey, Обозрение русских летописных сводов XIV—XVI вв. ["A review of Rus' chronicles from the 14th to 16th centuries"]. Moscow/Leningrad. 1938. (posthumously)
- Ulashchik, N.N., ed. (1980b). "Виленская летопись (опис)" [Chronicle of Vilnius (description)]. Bilorusjko-lytovsjki litopysy Білорусько-литовські літописи [The Belarusian–Lithuanian Chronicles]. Complete Collection of Rus' Chronicles (PSRL) (in Russian). Vol. 35. Moscow: Nauka / Izbornyk. pp. 7–8. Archived from the original on 8 August 2025.
