= Tale about Podolia =

The Tale of Podolia or Podillia, or the Tale about Podolia, (Note: Ruthenian original: О Подолськои земли, O Podols'koi zemli, 'About the Podolian Land'. Belarusian: Аповесць пра Падолле, romanized: Apoviesc' pra Padołle. Taraškievica Belarusian: Аповесьць пра Падольле, romanized: Apovies'c' pra Padoł'le. Ukrainian: Повість про Поділля, romanized: Povistj pro Podillja. Russian: Повесть о Подолье, romanized: Povest' o Podol'e.) is a 15th-century narrative written in Early Ruthenian, found in the first redaction of the Lithuanian Chronicles. It is estimated to have been written within the reigning circles of the Grand Duchy of Lithuania in Vilnius in the early 1430s, after the death of Vytautas the Great in 1430, which led up to the Lithuanian Civil War (1432–1438).

== Contents ==
The main content of the Tale covers the history of the region of Podolia from about 1350 until the 1430s, as well as its incorporation into Lithuania. Written in the Belarusian recension of Early Ruthenian without dates, it is distinguished by its journalistic style and secular content, as religion plays almost no role in the narrative. It provides some valuable records on local history in Ukraine and Belarus. In particular, it is the first source to state that three Tatar 'tsars' called Kutlubuh, Khadjibey, and Dmytro were reigning in three different parts of Podolia around 1350; to describe in detail the conquest of Podolia by the Koriatovychi (Koryatowicze, Karijotaičiai); and to provide an account of the Battle of Blue Waters (1362/3). The Koriatovychi are said to have founded several cities, such as Kamianets (modern Kamianets-Podilskyi), and to have defended Podolia against Tatar raids. Next, grand duke Vytautas the Great would have completed the subjugation of all Podolia to Lithuania.

== Purpose ==
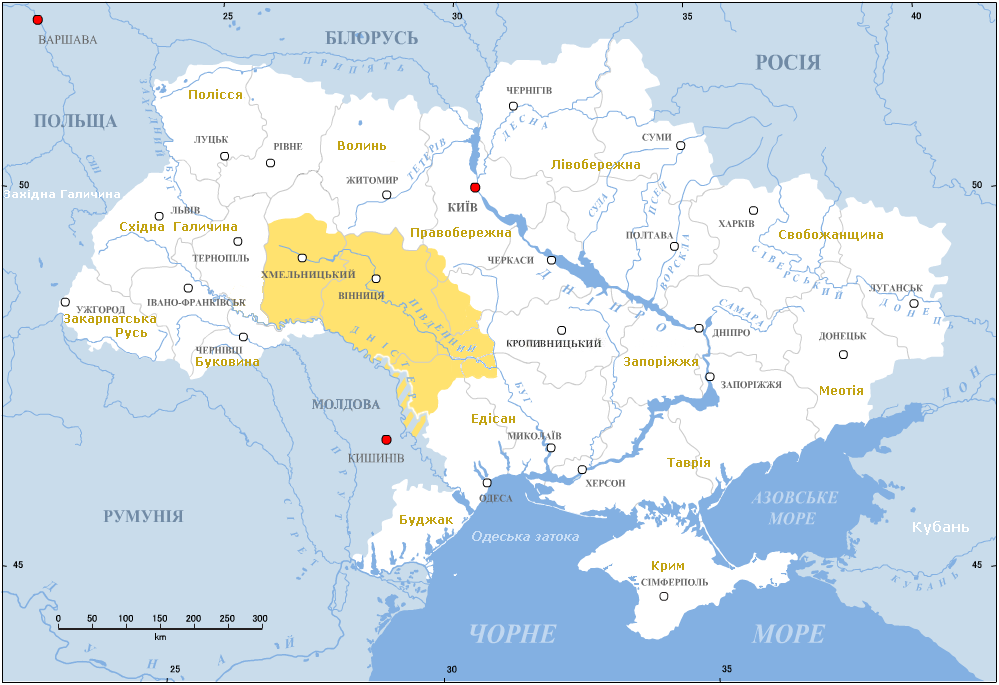
The region of Podolia or Podillia in modern Ukraine.

Created as a political document, its purpose was to justify Lithuanian rights to Podolia and condemn the policies of Polish feudal lords. The latter had seized Western Podolia (west of the river Murafa) after the death of Vytautas in 1430. Historian Oksana Slipushko (2022) succinctly summarised: "Its task is to prove the historical affiliation of the region to Lithuania, not Poland." Given that the Tale was written with this political goal of substantiating the claims of the Lithuanian nobility to Podolia against their Polish rivals, it does not provide an objective account of certain people or events.

Felix Shabuldo (2005) warned that the text seeks to exalt the virtues of Karijotas's sons rather than give an accurate account of the military campaign. He explained: "The name of the author of this written monument remains unknown. What is certain is that he was involved in the highest government and bureaucratic circles of the Grand Duchy of Lithuania and wrote his work in the early 1430s, at the height of the Polish-Lithuanian military conflict, during which both sides were resolving the political problem: to whom exactly – the Kingdom of Poland or the Grand Duchy of Lithuania – would the entire Podillian land belong."

Jaroslaw Pelenski (1998) similarly advised care when using the Tale to study the Battle of Blue Waters, "...because the tale about Podolia, entitled About the Podolian Land (O Podols'koi zemli) in the Lithuanian-Ruthenian Chronicles, which is the chief source, contains misleading information." Historian Vitaly M. Mykhailovskyj (2017) also recommended caution when using chronicle texts such as the Tale as a source for the early history of Podillia: "The main caveat to their use is that the earliest texts, such as The Tale of Podillia, date from the 1430s–1450s, and thus are at least 80–100 years removed from the initial history of the region. Such an early – as for the new region on the territory of modern Ukraine – identification in the sources prompts the researcher to take a closer look at this disputed territory."

== Textual criticism ==
Copies of the Tale of Podolia have been preserved in three redactions.

- the first redaction, as represented in:
  - the Supraśl Manuscript (written c. 1450, copied 1519 (Note: The Suprasl Chronicle contains the following excerpt on the Battle of Blue Waters from the Tale of Podolia: "When the hospodar of the Lithuanian land was Grand Duke Algirdas, and he went into the field with the Lithuanian army, he defeated the Tatars at the Blue Waters, three brothers: Prince Khochebii, Kutlubug, and Dmytro. And these three brothers, the Tatar princes, were the fathers and grandfathers of the Podolsk [Podolian] land, and from them they were in charge of the tamon, and the warriors, arriving from their tamon, extorted tribute from the Podolian land. And the brother of Grand Duke Algirdas, prince Karijotas, held Lithuanian Novgorod" [the Principality of Navahrudak], "and with him were four sons: Yuri, Oleksandr, Kostentin, Fedor, with the permission of the Grand Duke Algirdas and with the help of the Lithuanian land, went to the Podolian land. And then in the Podolian land there was not a single city, neither chopped from wood, nor built from stone. And then these Koriatovychi princes came to the Podolian land from the Tatars, and did not begin to give way to the bogatyrs. And at first they found for themselves a fortress on the river at Smotryti, and in another place there were nuns in the mountain, and in that place they destroyed the city of Bakota. And the hunters in the hunt came in handy for them: they drove off many deer to that island, where now the Kamenske place lies. And having cut down the forest, they walled up the city of Kamianets, and from there they walled up all the Podolian cities and settled the entire Podolian land."));
  - the Chronicle of Vilnius (c. 1495, part of the "Vilnius Manuscript / Chronicle of Avraamka"; incomplete, the chronicle breaks off mid-narrative); and
  - the Chronicler (Litopysets) of the Grand Dukes of Lithuania (1420s);
- the second redaction, also known as the Chronicle of the Grand Duchy of Lithuania, Ruthenia and Samogitia (1520s), as represented in:
  - the Archaeological Society, Krasiński, Raczyński, Olszew/Alševa, Rumyantsev, Yevreïnovsky and other manuscripts; and
- the third redaction, also known as the Bychowiec Chronicle (c. 1519~1542), as represented in:
  - Narbutt's 1846 copy of the Bychowiec manuscript (discovered in 1830, later lost), and
  - the Kraków manuscript (discovered in 2011, published in 2018).

| Manuscript | Incipit (Note: The first-redaction manuscripts all similarly translate to "About the Podolian Land. When Grand Duke Vytautas travelled from Lithuania to the great city of Lutsk, Grand Duke Algirdas marched into the field with the Lithuanian army and defeated the Tatars at the Blue Waters, killing three brothers, the Tatar princes Khachebey, Sakutlubug and Dmitry." The second- and third-redaction manuscripts significantly alter the text.) | Explicit (Note: Taking the Supraśl Manuscript as exemplar for the first-redaction common ending: "The Poles summoned lord Daugirdas from the city of Kamenets to a council to themselves and, not allowing him to reach the council, they seized and robbed him, and settled in Kamenets, and took everything that the Podolian [Podolsk] lands needed to be kept." However, this ending is lost in some manuscripts, and in later redactions, the Tale ends differently.) |
|---|---|---|
| Supraśl Manuscript; Fol. 102r–108r (л.102.–л.108.). | Коли господар был на Литовскои земли князь великы Олгирд и, шед в поле c литовъскимь воискомь, побиль татаров на СинЂи воде, трех братов: князя Хочебия ą Кутлубугу a Дмитрея. | ляхове, пана Долькгирда из города ис Каменца созвали на раду к собе и до рады не допустивши самого иняли и огьрабили, и Каменець засели, и все тое забрали, што Подолъскои земли держать. |
| Vilnius Manuscript (Note: Fol. 450r–450v (л.450.–л.450об.).) | (lost; the chronicle breaks off mid-narrative) | (lost; the chronicle breaks off mid-narrative) |
| Slutsk Manuscript; Fol. 41v–49r (л.41об.–л.49.). | Коли господаремь был на Лито товьскои земли князь великии Олгирд и, шедь в поле c литовьским воискомь, побиль татар на Синеи воде, трех братовь: князя Хачебея a Кутлубуга и Дмитрия. | леховЂ, и пана Долкгирда з города Каменца созвали на раду собе и до рады не допустили, самого иняли и ограбили, што Поидолъское земли держать. |
| Archaeological Society л.73об. | О Подолскои земли Опят отселе почнем. Коли князь Олкгирд пошол y поле з литовским воиском и побил татаров, татарских князеи, Качея... (manuscript breaks off mid-narrative) | (lost; the chronicle breaks off mid-narrative) |
| Krasiński Manuscript л.82об.–л.84. | О Подольскои земли Коли пак князь вЂликыи Витовт поехал з Литвы до великого Луцка, a князь вЂликыи Олькгирд пошол в полЂ з литовским воиском и побил татаров на Синеи ВодЂ, убил трех братов, татарьских князеи, Хачебея, Сакутлубуга a Дмитрея. | ляховЂ пана Довкгирда c Каменца созвали к собЂ на раду, и до рады не допустивши самого обрали и забили, и Каменець засЂли, иныи подолские городы. И до сих часов тым Подоле за ляхи зашло, и тепер держать. |
| Raczyński Manuscript л.260–л.262. | О Подольскои земли Коли Витовт пошол y поле з литовъским воиском и побил татар и князеи татарских на имя Хачея a Колобута, a Дмитрея. | ляхове пана Довкгирда c Каменца созвали к собЂ y раду, и до рады его не допустили, и забили, a Каменец засЂли и иншые городы подольские. И до сих часов тым Подолье за ляхи зашло, и тепер деръжать. |
| Olszew/Alševa Manuscript с.311.–с.314. | Iako xiądz vielki Vitold z Litwi iechal do Podola Potem, gdi xiądz vielki Vitolt do Podolskiey ziemie iechal z Litwi do Vielkiego Luczka, a xiądz Olgird poszedł w pole z litewskim voyskiem i pobił tatarow na Siney Vodzie, vbil trzech bratow, tatarskich xiążąt, Chaczabeia, Kukubuha, Dmitreia. | lachovie, pana Dolgirda s Kamienca zezvali do siebie na radą i, do radi nie dopusciwssi, iego zabili, i Kamienieć zasiedli i insse Podolskie zamki, i do tich czassow tym Podole za lachi zaszło, i teras dzierżą. |
| Rumyantsev Manuscript | О Подолскои земли Опять отселЂ почнем, коли князь Олкгирд пошол в полЂ c литовским воиском и побил татаров, татарских князеи ХачЂя a Колобуга, a Дмитрия. | ляхове пана Довкгирда c Каменца созвали к собЂ на раду, и до рады не пустили, его забили, a Каменец засЂли и иныи городы подолскии, и до сих часов Подоле за ляхи зашло, и тепер держат. |
| Yevreïnovsky Manuscript л.495.–л.498. + л.506.–л.506об. | И потом князь Оркгирд в поле c литовским воиском пошол воевати татар, и побил татарских князеи, Хочея и Лобуса, и ДмитрЂя. | И князь Витовт послал королю Якгаилу 20 000 кои грошеи паном Немиром и Дмитрием Василевичем, и лоским БІоренком, a городы к себЂ поимал и посадил на них воеводу своево дворянина Грановскаго, а по Грановском дал пану Петру Мантикгардовичю, и под паном Петром дал пану Дидикголду, потом пану дал Дидикголду Смоленеск. (...) Того же лЂта по смерти князя великаго Витовта и приЂхали ляхове пана Олкгирда c Каменца Подолского призвали к себЂ на раду, и до рады его не пустили, и самого убили, и Каменец засЂли, и все Подоле побрали, что и до сего дни держат. |
| Bychowiec Chronicle стр.35.– | 1351 hod. Kniaź weliki Olgierd, sobrawszysia so siłami swoimi litowskimi, y szodszy pobił tatar na Siney wode, troch bratow, Chaczy-beja, a Kutłubuhu, a Dmitreja. (Note: "In the year 1351, Grand Duke Algirdas, having gathered his Lithuanian forces, marched and defeated the Tatars at the Blue Waters, namely the three brothers Khachi-bey, Kutlubuhu and Dmitry." In some other versions, this story is attributed to Vytautas rather than Algirdas. The continuation of the Tale about Podolia is also omitted in this version.) | – |

== Interpretation ==
Other narratives contained in these manuscript compilations include some conflicts between Lithuania and the Principality of Smolensk, related with a negative Tendenz towards Smolensk, especially when Andrei of Polotsk lost the succession struggle from his half-brother Jogaila, and fled to Smolensk in 1387.

The narratives about Vytautas are concluded with a separate panegyric, the Praise to Vytautas. This highly artistic work promoted ideas of Lithuanian patriotism and political independence, and several researchers have noted strong similarities between the Praise to Vytautas and the Tale of Podolia. Whereas the "all-Ruthenian" first part of the early Belarusian-Lithuanian Chronicle, The Tale of the Faithful Holy Rus' Princes, is a highly selective anthology of entries relating to Lithuania from the earlier Novgorod First Chronicle and Kievan Chronicle, both the Tale of Podolia and the Praise to Vytautas were new compositions and not mere redactions from existing sources. Nevertheless, the texts of both stories later experienced significant changes. According to Feoktyst Sushytsky (1929), the Lithuanian part of the chronicle was written in Smolensk.

Serhii Plokhy (2006) observed that the Tale "presents the story of the Lithuanian-Polish struggle for Podilia from the viewpoint of the Lithuanian princes. So strong was local identity at the time that the narrative makes no reference whatever to the Rus' Land, while its principal subject, the Podolian Land, is given the same prominence as the Lithuanian Land."

== See also ==
- Duchy of Podolia
- Principality of Navahrudak
- Praise to Vytautas
- Battle of the Murafa (1432)

== Bibliography ==
=== Primary sources ===
- Ulashchik, N.N., ed. (1980a). Bilorusjko-lytovsjki litopysy: Suprasljsjkyj litopys Білорусько-литовські літописи: Супрасльський літопис [The Belarusian–Lithuanian Chronicles: The Supraśl Chronicle]. Complete Collection of Rus' Chronicles (PSRL) (in Belarusian). Vol. 35. Moscow: Nauka / Izbornyk. p. 306.
- Ulashchik, N.N., ed. (1980c). Bilorusjko-lytovsjki litopysy: Slucjkyj litopys Білорусько-литовські літописи: Слуцький літопис [The Belarusian–Lithuanian Chronicles: The Slutsk Chronicle]. Complete Collection of Rus' Chronicles (PSRL) (in Belarusian). Vol. 35. Moscow: Nauka / Izbornyk. pp. 68–84.
- Ulashchik, N.N., ed. (1980d). Bilorusjko-lytovsjki litopysy: Vilensjkyj litopys Білорусько-литовські літописи: Віленський літопис [The Belarusian–Lithuanian Chronicles: The Chronicle of Vilnius]. Complete Collection of Rus' Chronicles (PSRL) (in Belarusian). Vol. 35. Moscow: Nauka / Izbornyk. pp. 85–90. (critical edition of Fol. 437r – 450v of the Vilnius Manuscript, containing the Chronicle of Vilnius).

=== Literature ===
- Mykhailovskyj, Vitaly M. (2017). "Формування території історичного Поділля у другій половині XIV ст" [Formation of the territory of historical Podillia in the second half of the 14th century] (PDF). Ukrainian Historical Journal (in Ukrainian) (3). Institute of History of Ukraine: 67–82.
- Mykhailovskyj, Vitaly M. (2018). "Володіння "трьох татарських царів" та уявлення про "потрійне Поділля" в битві під Ґрюнвальдом" [The possessions of the 'three Tatar tsars' and the idea of 'threefold Podillia' in the Battle of Grunwald]. Ukrainian Historical Journal (in Ukrainian) (1). Institute of History of Ukraine: 4–17. ISSN 0130-5247.
- Pelenski, Jaroslaw (1998). The Contest for the Legacy of Kievan Rus'. East European monographs. New York: Columbia University Press. p. 325. ISBN 978-0-88033-274-3.
- Plokhy, Serhii (2006). The Origins of the Slavic Nations: Premodern Identities in Russia, Ukraine, and Belarus (PDF). New York: Cambridge University Press. pp. 10–15. ISBN 978-0-521-86403-9. Archived (PDF) from the original on 6 June 2011.
- Shabuldo, Felix (2005). "Синьоводська битва 1362 p. у сучасній науковій інтерпретації" [The Battle of Blue Waters in 1362 in Modern Scientific Interpretation] (PDF). Синьоводська проблема у новітніх дослідженнях [The Blue Waters Problem in Recent Studies] (in Ukrainian). Institute of History of Ukraine. pp. 9–10. ISBN 966-02-3563-1.
- Slipushko, Oksana (2022). "Lietuvos ir Rusios kronikos mąstymo paradigma vėlyvaisiais viduramžiais / Lithuanian-Ruthenian Chronicle Paradigm of Thinking in the Late Middle Ages". LOGOS. 113: 18–25. doi:10.24101/logos.2022.69.
- Чамярыцкі В. Аповесць пра Падолле // Вялікае Княства Літоўскае. Энцыклапедыя у 3 т. — Мн.: БелЭн, 2005. — Т. 1 : Абаленскі — Кадэнцыя. — С. 139. — 684 с. — ISBN 985-11-0314-4. (in Belarusian)
- Полехов С. В. Летописная «Повесть о Подолье». [Ч. 1] // Древняя Русь. Вопросы медиевистики. — 2014. — № 1 (55). — С. 33—42. (in Russian)
- Полехов С. В. Летописная «Повесть о Подолье». [Ч. 2] // Древняя Русь. Вопросы медиевистики. — 2014. — № 2 (56). — С. 49—62. (in Russian)
- Ulashchik, N.N., ed. (1980b). "Супрасльская летопись (опис)" [Supraśl Chronicle (description)]. Bilorusjko-lytovsjki litopysy Білорусько-литовські літописи [The Belarusian–Lithuanian Chronicles]. Complete Collection of Rus' Chronicles (PSRL) (in Russian). Vol. 35. Moscow: Nauka / Izbornyk. pp. 118–127. Archived from the original on 8 August 2025.
