= Duchy of Podolia =

Medieval Ruthenian duchy

Подільське князівство Księstwo podolskie
- 1363–1394
- Flag Coat of arms
- Status: Fiefdom of Poland, Hungary and Lithuania
- Capital: Smotrych, Kamianets-Podilskyi
- Common languages: Ruthenian language
- Religion: Christianity
- Government: Monarchy
- Historical era: Late Middle Ages
  - Established: 1363
  - Disestablished: 1394

The Duchy of Podolia or Principality of Podolia (Note: Ukrainian: Подільське князівство, romanized: Podiljsjke knjazivstvo. (The word knyaz is conventionally translated as "prince" in English). Polish: Księstwo podolskie. Lithuanian: Podolės kunigaikštystė.) was a historical polity that emerged from the territory of the former Kingdom of Galicia–Volhynia. The principality was formed in the southwestern lands of the former kingdom during the 14th-century Galicia–Volhynia Wars. These wars were a conflict over the succession and territories involving the Kingdom of Poland, the Grand Duchy of Lithuania, the Kingdom of Hungary, and the Golden Horde.

The principality was established by the Koriatovych brothers (Lithuanian: Karijotaičiai), sons of Karijotas and members of the Lithuanian Gediminid clan. Prominent among the early rulers were Prince Yuriy Koriatovych and his brothers Oleksandr, Konstantin, and Fedir. They gained control over Podolia following the Lithuanian victory over the Golden Horde at the Battle of Blue Waters (c. 1362/1363), likely under the authority of their uncle, Grand Duke Algirdas of Lithuania. Yuriy and Oleksandr acknowledged Polish suzerainty under King Casimir III of Poland around 1366, although their primary allegiance appears to have been with Lithuania initially.

In 1377, following a military campaign in the region, Podolia became a fiefdom of the Kingdom of Hungary under King Louis I of Hungary. After King Louis I's death in 1382, the Koriatovych rulers supported the election of Jogaila, Grand Duke of Lithuania, as King of Poland in 1386, aligning themselves with the emerging Polish–Lithuanian union. Previous allegiances to the Hungarian crown became complex and contested during Hungary's subsequent succession struggles.

Circa 1394, Grand Duke Vytautas of Lithuania conquered Podolia, removing the last ruling brother, Fedir Koriatovych. Podolia was then granted by King Jogaila (Władysław II Jagiełło) to the Voivode of Krakow, Spytko II of Melsztyn, around 1395. Following Spytko's death at the Battle of the Vorskla River in 1399, King Jogaila granted Podolia to his own brother, Prince Švitrigaila. In 1401, Švitrigaila briefly fled to the Teutonic Order amid conflicts within the Polish-Lithuanian realm. Around 1403, Fedir Koriatovych, who had found refuge in Hungary, formally renounced his claims to the principality.

Finally, in 1434, following further conflicts and consolidation of Polish control, the territory of the former principality was fully incorporated into the Crown of the Kingdom of Poland and reorganized as the Podolian Voivodeship.

== Territory ==
Podolia, a historical region in Eastern Europe whose name signifies 'lowlands' or 'along the valley,' was often divided into western and eastern parts. Geographically, Western Podolia lay towards the Dniester River basin, while Eastern Podolia was associated with the Southern Bug (Boh) River basin.

In earlier periods, before the Mongol invasions, this land, known then as Ponizie ('lowlands'), was inhabited by various Slavic tribes, including the Ulichians and Tivertsians. It fell within the sphere of influence of, and was sometimes contested by, the neighboring principalities of Galicia and Kyiv. The rulers of these neighboring principalities largely belonged to the Rurikids.

Following the Mongol invasion of Kievan Rus' (c. 1237–1241), most of Podolia was conquered and came under the control of the Golden Horde, administered as the Podilsky Ulus. Efforts were made by neighboring powers to assert influence; for instance, around 1257, Daniel of Galicia-Volhynia campaigned in the region, including against the Bolokhoveni people, whose territory partly overlapped with northern Podolia and who sometimes allied with the Horde.

Geographically, the core territory of Podolia stretched from the Strypa and Zolota Lypa rivers in the west towards the Southern Bug (Boh) River in the east. The Dniester River formed its southwestern and southern border, separating it from the regions of Moldavia and Bukovina. To the south, Podolia transitioned into the steppe zone largely controlled by the Golden Horde, while to the north, it adjoined the lands of Volhynia and Kyiv.

One of the earliest accounts on the origins of Podolia is the Tale about Podolia (1430s), transmitted in various Lithuanian Chronicles. The Tale is not always historically reliable, however, as it was written with a deliberate pro-Lithuanian and anti-Polish political goal. Later historical accounts, such as that of the 16th-century chronicler Alessandro Guagnini, described the Podolian region in very broad terms. Guagnini suggested its western borders were near Muntenia (Wallachia) and possibly Moldavia ('Volos lands') and claimed it extended eastward as far as the Don River - likely reflecting the vast, loosely defined steppe frontiers ('Wild Fields') of the era rather than the core territory.

== History ==
The last monarch of Galicia–Volhynia was Yuri II Boleslav, son of Maria Yurievna (daughter of Yuri I of Galicia) and Trojden I, Duke of Mazovia. He acknowledged the suzerainty of the Golden Horde. In 1337, jointly with Horde troops, he launched a campaign against Poland, attempting to recapture the Lublin lands, which had been seized by the Poles in 1303. While maintaining peaceful relations with Lithuania and the Teutonic Order, Yuri II faced hostility from Poland and Hungary, who were preparing a joint attack on the Kingdom of Galicia–Volhynia.

Following his poisoning in 1340, a struggle for the territory of the Galicia–Volhynia state erupted between Liubartas, Grand Duke of Volhynia, and King Casimir III the Great of Poland. In 1349, King Casimir III conquered Galicia. In April 1350, Louis I of Hungary came to an agreement with Casimir III whereby Hungary conditionally transferred its hereditary rights to the Kingdom of Galicia–Volhynia to Casimir III for his lifetime.

The Koriatovychi, princes of Lithuanian Gediminid origin, began to establish control over Podolia following the disintegration of the Galicia–Volhynia Kingdom. In 1362, four Koriatovychi brothers – Oleksandr, Yuri, Kostiantyn, and Fedor – fought alongside their paternal uncle, Grand Duke Algirdas of Lithuania, in the Battle of Blue Waters against the Golden Horde. Around 1363, by agreement among the brothers, the Principality of Podolia was formed from their possessions.

The brothers were co-rulers of this principality: Yuri held Kamianets, and Kostiantyn held Smotrych. Fedor was likely in Hungary at this time. In 1371, Oleksandr Koriatovych returned to Podolia. The initial primary rulers appear to have been Yuri and Oleksandr Koriatovych. Other known brothers included Borys and Vasyl Koriatovych. In documents, they appear either individually or as ruling pairs. This system of co-rulership was not unusual for the period.

In 1366, the Principality of Podolia became a vassal of the Kingdom of Poland, and the rulers, Oleksandr and Yuri Koriatovych, paid tribute to King Casimir III. From this time, the rulers of the Principality of Podolia often governed as a pair (a duumvirate), typically involving the senior active brother alongside another.

Around 1374, Knyaz Yuri was invited to the throne of the neighboring Principality of Moldavia, ruling until 1377, when he was poisoned by local boyars (he was reportedly buried in a monastery nearby Bârlad). Circa 1374, the capital of Podolia was moved from Smotrych to Kamianets (Kamianets-Podilskyi), which Yuri developed into a fortress city with a castle and fortifications. Around the same time, Kamianets received Magdeburg rights from Princes Yuri and Oleksandr. His brother Oleksandr, who had previously held Volodymyr and Kremenets, succeeded him as a primary ruler in Podolia.

Following the death of Casimir III in 1370, his nephew, Louis I of Hungary (who also became King of Poland), asserted his claim as King of Galicia–Volhynia, based on earlier agreements such as the Congress of Visegrád (1339). In 1372, Louis I appointed his relative, the Silesian Duke Vladislaus II of Opole, as governor of Galicia (ruling from 1372 to c. 1379 and again from 1385 to 1387).

In 1377, following a military campaign by King Louis I into the region, Knyazes Oleksandr and Borys Koriatovych acknowledged the vassal dependence of Podolia on the Kingdom of Hungary. Evidence of this overlordship includes Podolian half-groschen coins, likely minted in Smotrych (the first capital), depicting the Angevin coat of arms of Hungary on the reverse. The ruling pairs (duumvirates) among the senior Koriatovychi included Yuri and Oleksandr, Oleksandr and Borys, Borys and Kostiantyn, Kostiantyn and Fedor, and Fedor and Vasyl. However, some specific coin types, previously attributed generally to the Koriatovychi, are now attributed by numismatists specifically to Kostiantyn Koriatovych alone. These coins are relatively rare. One side of these coins typically depicts Saint George (Sviatyi Yuriy), while the reverse shows the coat of arms of the Angevin kings of Hungary, (Note: Charles I of Hungary and Louis I of Hungary) combining the red and white Árpád stripes on the left with the gold lilies on a blue field of the Angevin dynasty on the right. Numismatists interpret the inscription as potentially reading, "Coin of Knyaz Kostiantyn, Lord of Smotrych." These coins were modeled on the Galician-Ruthenian currency minted in Lviv and are known as Podolian half-groschen.

Another known coin is the Podolian Denarius of Knyaz Fedor Koriatovych, who ruled Podolia c. 1388–1393. These coins, sometimes marked 'P.K.' (possibly 'Podilsky Knyaz' - Prince of Podolia), measure approximately 12x13.5 mm, weigh around 0.30 g, and have a silver fineness of 0.600 (60% silver).

Upon the death of Louis I of Hungary in 1382, his elder daughter Maria became Queen Regnant of Hungary (1382–1395) and claimant to Galicia–Volhynia. His younger daughter, Jadwiga, became Queen Regnant of Poland (ruled from 1384 to 1399). Following the death of King Louis I in 1382, Knyazes Borys and Kostiantyn Koriatovych played an active role in the political events leading to the selection of Jogaila, Grand Duke of Lithuania, for the Polish royal throne and his marriage to the young Queen Jadwiga.

Circa 1389, Fedor Koriatovych inherited rule over Podolia upon the deaths of his older brothers. In 1392, Fedor formed an alliance with Svidrigail (Švitrigaila), then Prince of Vitebsk, who also opposed the centralizing policies of Jogaila (Note: by then King Władysław II Jagiełło of Poland) and Vytautas. (Note: Grand Duke of Lithuania) These policies aimed at the full subordination, and potential elimination, of the semi-independent appanage principalities.

== Citations ==
=== Sources ===
- Slipushko, Oksana (2022). "Lietuvos ir Rusios kronikos mąstymo paradigma vėlyvaisiais viduramžiais / Lithuanian-Ruthenian Chronicle Paradigm of Thinking in the Late Middle Ages". LOGOS. 113: 18–25. doi:10.24101/logos.2022.69.
- Witalij Mychajłowśkyj: Подільське князівство. W Encykłopedija istoriji Ukrajiny : у 10 т. / редкол.: В. А. Смолій (голова) та ін.; Інститут історії України НАН України. T. 8 : Па — Прик. Kijów: Wyd. Наук. думка, 2011, s. 305 — 306. ISBN 978-966-00-1142-7.
