= Gathering of the Russian lands =

Historiographical concept

The gathering of the Russian lands or Rus' lands (Note: Alternatively called the "gathering of the lands of Rus".) (Russian: собирание русских земель) was the process in which new states – usually the Principality of Moscow and the Grand Duchy of Lithuania – acquired former territories of Kievan Rus' from the 14th century onwards, claiming to be its legitimate successor. (Note: "But why did the Lithuanian Grand Principality contest the Golden Horde's position in Eastern Europe, and why did Witold [1998: Vytautas] attempt the political subjugation of this Mongol-Tatar empire? The decision arose from the desire of Lithuanian rulers to build a great Lithuanian state that would include all the territories of Old Rus' [1998: Rus']. In particular, the claim of the Lithuanian grand princes to "all Rus'" [1998: "all of Rus'"] and their program of "gathering of all the Rus' lands," advanced even before Muscovite Rus' had developed an equivalent program of her own, promoted the Lithuanian grand principality into the role of successor state to Kievan Rus', and this represented a direct challenge to the Golden Horde. Having embarked upon a policy of expansion into Rus', Lithuania also faced Muscovy as a competitor.") In Russian historiography, this phenomenon represented the consolidation of a national state centered on Moscow. The sobriquet gatherer of the Russian lands or Rus' Land (Russian: собиратель русской земли, romanized: sobiratel' russkoi zemli) is also given to the grand princes of Moscow by Russian historians, especially to Ivan III. The term is also used to describe the expansion of the Grand Duchy of Lithuania into Rus' principalities; the Lithuanian grand dukes claimed authority over all territories inhabited by Rus' people (East Slavs). Some historians argue that Lithuania began "gathering Rus' lands" before Muscovy did. The rulers of Moscow adopted the title Sovereign of all Russia (later changed to Tsar of all Russia and finally Emperor and Autocrat of all Russia) while the Lithuanian Grand Dukes adopted the title King of the Lithuanians and [many] Ruthenians and later under the Polish–Lithuanian union as King of Poland, Grand Prince of Lithuania, Rus, Prussia, Samogitia, Mazovia and other.

== Origin of the phrase ==
According to scholar Charles J. Halperin (1973, 2022), the first time the idea of gathering Rus' lands appears in writing is in the vita of Dmitry "Donskoy" Ivanovich, (Note: Full title: Слово о житии и преставлении великого книазиа Дмитрииа Ивановича, тсариа руськаго (Slovo o zhitii i prestavlenii velikogo kniazia Dmitriia Ivanovicha, tsaria rus’kago; "Word about the life and repose of the great prince Dmitry Ivanovich, Tsar of Rus'").) wherein his grandfather Ivan "Kalita" Danilovich is called the "gatherer of the Rus' Land". The vita's dating is complicated, with Polish–Ukrainian historian Jaroslaw Pelenski (1977) concluding it was probably written in 1454 or 1455. Pelenski translated the opening passage of Donskoy's vita as follows:

"This Grand Prince Dmitrij was born to his honorable and venerable father, Grand Prince Ivan Ivanovič, and his mother, Grand Princess Aleksandra, and he was a grandson of Grand Prince Ivan Danilovič, the gatherer of the Russian land[s], [and] he was the most fertile branch and the most beautiful flower from the God-planted orchard of Car Vladimir, the New Constantine who baptized the Russian land, and he was [also] a kinsman (srodnik) of Boris and Gleb, the miracle-workers."

== In historiography ==
=== In historiography on the Principality of Moscow ===
The concept arose in Russian tsarist-era historiography of the 19th century, and the term could be found in works of several historians such as Dmitry Ilovaysky, Kazimierz Waliszewski, and many others. The concept has been used to justify the liquidation of feudal fragmentation in the post-Golden Horde period.

Several historians of Muscovy/Russia have written that the process of "gathering" culminated during the reign of Ivan III (r. 1462–1505), in which he established a unified monarchy. Although various semi-independent princes still claimed certain territories during his reign, Ivan's overlordship was acknowledged by the princes. By the 16th century, Ivan IV (r. 1533–1584) became the undisputed autocratic ruler of Russia and the policy of "gathering" Russian lands helped pave the way for Russian eastward expansion, including non-Russian territories.

According to Marc Raeff, this process became indistinguishable from imperial expansion with the annexation of the Astrakhan and Kazan khanates as well as the movements of the peasants into new territories. Raeff says that "Indigenous groups mingled with Russians that had moved in, and transfers of population resulted in linguistic and cultural mixtures within the same administrative unit". As a result, "Russian society remained largely unaware of the state’s having become a multinational empire".

=== In historiography on the Grand Duchy of Lithuania ===
In Soviet historiography in the 1980s, there were disputes between scholars over which polities had a "right" to gather the lands of Rus'. The pre-1917 tradition, as represented by Igor Grekhov, argued that the Grand Duchy of Lithuania was predominantly populated by Eastern Slavs, and was therefore a legitimate gatherer. On the other hand, the Soviet-era doctrine, as expressed by Vladimir Pashuto, regarded Moscow as the only legitimate gatherer, while Lithuania's expansion was considered to be outright aggression. Pelenski (1982, 1998) reasoned that "the claim of the Lithuanian grand princes to "all of Rus'" and their program of "gathering of all the Rus' lands," advanced even before Muscovite Rus' had developed an equivalent program of her own, promoted the Lithuanian grand principality into the role of successor state to Kievan Rus', and this represented a direct challenge to the Golden Horde."

Ukrainian historian Serhii Plokhy (2006) cited the 1338 Lithuanian–Livonian Treaty as evidence that grand duke Gediminas of Lithuania was in effect a "gatherer of the Rus' lands", as the Middle Low German text distinguished Lettowen ("Lithuania") and Rusce ("Rus'"), Ruslande or Ruscelande ("Rus' Land" or "Ruthenia") as the two parts of the realm, inhabited by Lettowen ("Lithuanians") and Ruscen ("Rus'" or "Ruthenians"), both under the ret ("authority") of the koningh van Lettowen ("king of Lithuania"), where any visiting Dudesche kopman ("German merchant") and their goods would be under his legal protection. Halperin (2022) questioned whether the 1338 Treaty described political rather than purely geographical dimensions of the Rus' Land. On the other hand, he confirmed that in many sources such as the Hypatian Codex (including the Kievan Chronicle and Galician–Volhynian Chronicle), the Belarusian–Lithuanian Chronicles (including the Bychowiec Chronicle), the Praise to Vytautas, and the Hustyn Chronicle, the term "Rus' Land" is variously used as either comprising all the Ruthenian territories of the Grand Duchy of Lithuania, or only its Belarusian territories, or (more rarely) only its Ukrainian territories, instead of Suzdalia and later Muscovy.

A passage in the Livonian Chronicle of Hermann von Wartberge (died c. 1380) suggests that from 1358 onwards, Grand Duke Algirdas was the first secular ruler who claimed to reign all of Rus', which the Lithuanians were to defend from the intrusions of the Tatars. (Note: Item postulabant, quod ordo locaretur ad solitudines inter Tartaros et Rutenos ad defendendum eos ab impugnacione Tartarorum et quod nihil iuris ordo sibi reservaret apud Rutenos, sed omnis Russia ad Letwinos deberet simpliciter pertinere. ("They" [Lithuanian diplomats negotiating with the Livonian Order] "also demanded that an order should be placed in the deserts between the Tatars and the Ruthenians [Rutenos] to defend them from the aggression of the Tatars, and that no legal order should be reserved for itself among the Ruthenians [Rutenos], but that all of Rus' [omnis Russia] should simply belong to the Lithuanians [Letwinos].")) Raffensperger & Ostrowski interpreted this as Algirdas "formulat[ing] the goals of Lithuanian policy in the east and the south".

=== In historiography on the Golden Horde ===
According to Jaroslaw Pelenski (1982, 1998), the Golden Horde should be considered as a gatherer of Rus' lands in its own right, in which Muscovy long functioned as its mere vassal, rather than the main rival of Lithuania: "In comparison, the relationship between Lithuania-Rus' and the Golden Horde, in whose system Muscovy was integrated, has received very little attention. This comparative neglect appears unjustified since Lithuania, or Lithuania-Rus', and the Golden Horde were the two principal contestants in the struggle for supremacy in Eastern Europe, specifically for the lands of Old Rus', in the fourteenth century. Lithuania-Rus' and Muscovy were also competing for the succession to Old Rus'. However, their conflicts and confrontations cannot be analyzed outside the larger scope of the relations between Lithuania and the Golden Horde. Muscovy, a vassal state of the Golden Horde, played a significant, albeit secondary, role in this peculiar triangular relationship."

Christian Raffensperger and Donald Ostrowski (2023) presented and followed Pelenski's view of these 'three major interrelated conflicts', concurring that "in the fourteenth century, a gambling person would most likely have placed their bets on either the Lithuanian rulers or Tatar khans to win these power struggles, because the rulers of Vladimir-Suzdal were still vassals of the latter."

== Bibliography ==
=== Primary sources ===
- Salmina, M.A. (1985). "Cлово о житии великого князя Дмитрия Ивановича" [Word about the life of great prince Dmitry Ivanovich]. pushkinskijdom.ru (in Russian and Church Slavic). (Original text of the Encomium to Ivanovich alias the vita of Dmitry Donskoy, in Church Slavonic; introduction and translation in modern Russian by M.A. Salmina).

=== Literature ===
- Acton, Edward (1995). Russia: The Tsarist and Soviet Legacy. Longman. ISBN 978-0-582-08915-0.
- Boyd, Kelly (9 October 2019). Encyclopedia of Historians and Historical Writing. Routledge. ISBN 978-1-136-78764-5.
- Cox, Michael; Dunne, Timothy; Booth, Ken (2001). Empires, Systems and States: Great Transformations in International Politics. Cambridge University Press. ISBN 978-0-521-01686-5.
- Curtis, Glenn Eldon (1998). Russia: A Country Study. Federal Research Division, Library of Congress. ISBN 978-0-8444-0866-8.
- Halperin, Charles J. (2001). "Text and Textology: Salmina's Dating of the Chronicle Tales about Dmitrii Donskoi". Slavonic and East European Review. 79 (2): 248–263. doi:10.1353/see.2001.0046. S2CID 247621602.
- Halperin, Charles J. (2022). The Rise and Demise of the Myth of the Rus' Land (PDF). Leeds: Arc Humanities Press. p. 107. ISBN 9781802700565.
- Gibson, James R. (18 November 2011). Feeding the Russian Fur Trade: Provisionment of the Okhotsk Seaboard and the Kamchatka Peninsula, 1639–1856. University of Wisconsin Pres. ISBN 978-0-299-05233-1.
- Kumar, Krishan (6 August 2019). Visions of Empire: How Five Imperial Regimes Shaped the World. Princeton University Press. ISBN 978-0-691-19280-2.
- Moss, Walter G. (1 July 2003). A History of Russia Volume 1: To 1917. Anthem Press. ISBN 978-1-84331-023-5.
- Pelenski, Jaroslaw (1977). "The origins of the official Muscovite claims to the "Kievan inheritance"". Harvard Ukrainian Studies. 1 (1). [President and Fellows of Harvard College, Harvard Ukrainian Research Institute]: 29–52. ISSN 0363-5570. JSTOR 41035738.
- Pelenski, Jaroslaw (1982). "The Contest between Lithuania-Rus' and the Golden Horde in the Fourteenth Century for Supremacy over Eastern Europe". Archivum Eurasiae Medii Aevi (PDF). Peter de Ridder Press. pp. 303–320.
  - Pelenski, Jaroslaw (1998). The Contest for the Legacy of Kievan Rus'. East European monographs. East European Monographs. p. 141. ISBN 978-0-88033-274-3.
- Plokhy, Serhii (2006). The Origins of the Slavic Nations: Premodern Identities in Russia, Ukraine, and Belarus (PDF). New York: Cambridge University Press. pp. 10–15. ISBN 978-0-521-86403-9. Archived (PDF) from the original on 6 June 2011.
- Raffensperger, Christian; Ostrowski, Donald (2023). The Ruling Families of Rus: Clan, Family and Kingdom. London: Reaktion Books. p. 309. ISBN 978-1-78914-745-2. (e-book)
- Ragsdale, Hugh; Ponomarev, V. N. (29 October 1993). Imperial Russian Foreign Policy. Cambridge University Press. ISBN 978-0-521-44229-9.
- Vujačić, Veljko (26 March 2015). Nationalism, Myth, and the State in Russia and Serbia: Antecedents of the Dissolution of the Soviet Union and Yugoslavia. Cambridge University Press. p. 97. ISBN 978-1-316-24060-1.
- Wortman, Richard S. (31 October 2013). Scenarios of Power: Myth and Ceremony in Russian Monarchy from Peter the Great to the Abdication of Nicholas II - New Abridged One-Volume Edition. Princeton University Press. ISBN 978-1-4008-4969-7.
