= Chronicle of the Grand Duchy of Lithuania, Ruthenia and Samogitia =

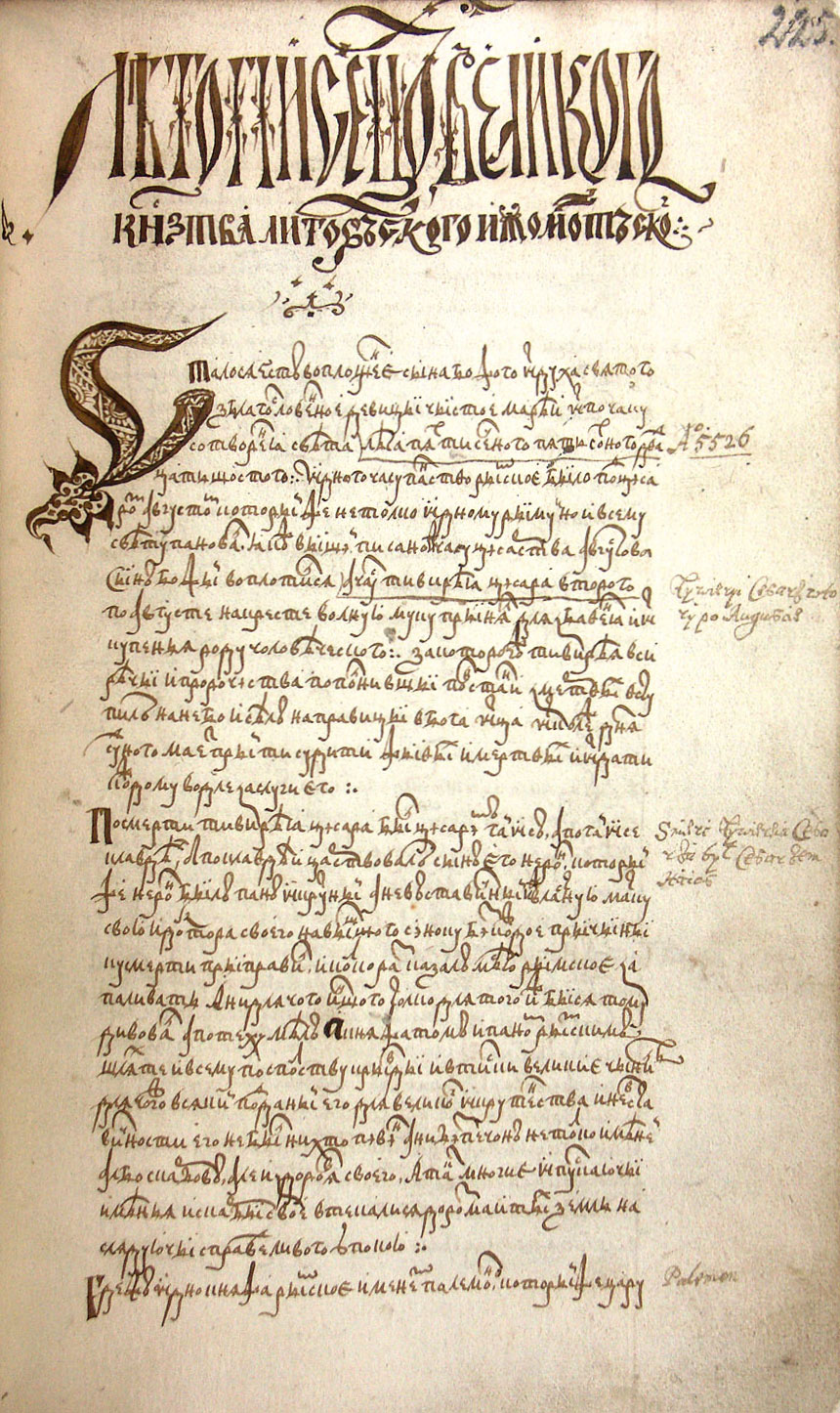
Raczyński manuscript (late 16th century) of the Chronicle of the Grand Duchy of Lithuania, Ruthenia and Samogitia. Raczyński Library, Poznań.

The Chronicle of the Grand Duchy of Lithuania, Ruthenia and Samogitia (see #Name) is an early modern chronicle of Grand Duchy of Lithuania. It is considered the second redaction of the Belarusian–Lithuanian Chronicles. It was written in the Ruthenian language in the 1520s among the aristocracy of Vilnius.

== Contents ==
The Chronicle describes the history of Lithuania from the mythical prince Palemon to Gediminas. The chronicle is based on a legend about the descent of Lithuanian rulers from the "Roman nobility" (patricians). It contains oral traditions about historical events: battles with the Tatars, Gediminas' campaigns in Ukraine (southern Rus'), the Kievan Chronicle (KC) and Galician–Volhynian Chronicle (GVC), and others. It exalts the heroic past of Lithuania, and denigrates former Kievan Rus'. To justify the superiority of Lithuanians over Ruthenians, the antiquity and nobility of the former's origin, and their prominent role in the life of the Grand Duchy of Lithuania are emphasised.

== Textual history ==
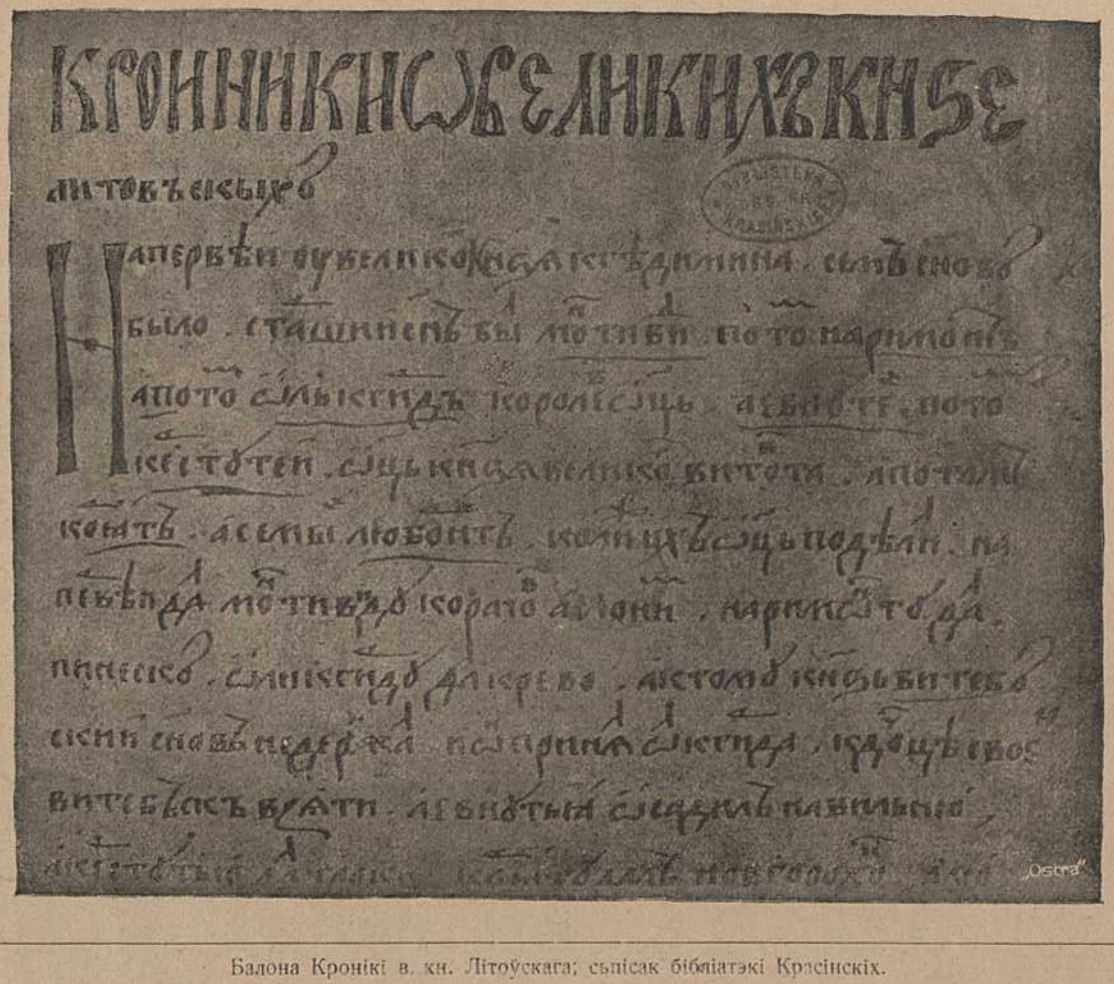
1925 facsimile fragment of the Krasinski manuscript; the original was lost when the Krasiński Library was destroyed in October 1944 during the Destruction of Warsaw.

The chronicle has survived in three redactions: short, long, and complete. A total of 11 copies are known to have survived until modern times.

- Short redaction:
  - Krasinski manuscript; leaves 64–72 of the Krasinski collection (16th century), destroyed in 1944 during World War II.
- Long redaction:
  - Alsheva/Olszew/Olshevo manuscript (c. 1550, contains Polish translations).
  - Archaeological Society manuscript (c. 1600).
  - Patriarchal manuscript.
  - Rumyantsev manuscript (second half of the 17th century; contains entries until the year 1567).
- Complete redaction:
  - Raczyński manuscript, also known as the Poznan manuscript (c. 1580; contains entries until the year 1548).
  - Evreinov manuscript.

The chronicle served as a source for the Bychowiec Chronicle (c. 1574), the Chronicle of Stryjkowski (Chronicle of Poland, Lithuania, Samogitia and all Rus') by Maciej Stryjkowski, and Teodor Narbutt's compilation History of the Lithuanian People (1840s).

The closely related Tobolsk manuscript (1740s), discovered by V. I. Buganov in the State Archive of the Tyumen Region (Department of Manuscript Books, No. 79), and Leningrad manuscript (1740s), discovered by Mikałaj Ułaščyk in the Manuscripts Department of the State Public Library named after Saltykova-Shchedryna in Leningrad (F.IV.372), were jointly published in a critical edition in PSRL Volume 32 in 1975 under the name Хроніка Литовська й Жмойтська (Lithuanian and Samogitian Chronicle).

== Name ==
=== Original ===
- Church Slavonic: ЛЂтописець Великого князьства Литовъского и Жомоицьского, "The Chronicle of the Grand Duchy of Lithuania and Zomoitsia" — name in the Krasinski manuscript.

=== Modern names ===
- Lithuanian name:
  - Lithuanian: Lietuvos ir Žemaičių Didžiosios Kunigaikštystės kronika, "The Chronicle of the Grand Duchy of Lithuania and Samogitia".
- Belarusian names:
  - Belarusian: Хроніка Вялікага Княства Літоўскага, Рускага і Жамойцкага, romanized: Khronika Vjalikagha knjastva Litouskagha, Ruskagha i Zhamojtskagha, "The Chronicle of the Grand Duchy of Lithuania, Ruthenia and Zhamojtsia".
  - Belarusian: Хроніка Вялікага княства Літоўскага і Жамойцкага, romanized: Khronika Vjalikagha knjastva Litouskagha i Zhamojtskagha, "The Chronicle of the Grand Duchy of Lithuania and Zhamojtsia".
- Ukrainian names:
  - Ukrainian: Хроніка Великого князівства Литовського, Руського і Жемайтського, romanized: Khronika Velykogho knjazivstva Lytovsjkogho, Rusjkogho i Zhemajtsjkogho, "The Chronicle of the Grand Duchy of Lithuania, Ruthenia and Zhemajtsja".
  - Ukrainian: Хроніка Великого князівства Литовського і Жемайтського, romanized: Khronika Velykogho knjazivstva Lytovsjkogho i Zhemajtsjkogho, "The Chronicle of the Grand Duchy of Lithuania and Zhemajtsja".
  - Ukrainian: Хроніка ВКЛ, romanized: Khronika VKL, "GDL Chronicle" — short name.

== Editions ==
Belarusian/Lithuanian edition (Kaunas 1925)

- Lastowski, Vatslaw, Лѣтописецъ Великого кн(я)зства Литовъско(го) и Жомоитсъкого (1925). (in Belarusian). pp. 68. Kaunas.
- Ulashchik, N.N., ed. (1980) [1975]. Bilorusjko-lytovsjki litopysy Білорусько-литовські літописи [The Belarusian–Lithuanian Chronicles]. Complete Collection of Rus' Chronicles (PSRL) (in Russian, Ukrainian, and Belarusian). Vol. 32, 35. Moscow: Nauka / Izbornyk. p. 306.
- Летапісы і хронікі Вялікага Княства Літоўскага (XV—XVII ст.): Социально-значимая литература (Помнікі даўняга пісьменства Беларусі). / Нацыянальная акадэмія навук Беларусі ; рэдкал. В. А. Чамярыцкі. (in Belarusian). Minsk: Беларуская навука [Belarusian Science], 2015.
- Gudmantas, Kęstutis (2024). Lietuvos ir Žemaičių Didžiosios Kunigaikštystės metraštis: monografinis leidimas ir kritinis leidimas. Chronicle of the Grand Duchy of Lithuania and Samogitia. A Study and a Critical Edition (in Lithuanian and English). Vilnius: Institute of Lithuanian Literature and Folklore. p. 459. ISBN 978-609-425-127-6.

== Bibliography ==
=== Monographs ===
- Okhrimenko, Pavlo Pavlovych, Ларчанка М. Р. Старажытная беларуская літаратура. Minsk, 1968.
- Dabrynin, M. K., Беларуская літаратура. Старажытны перыяд. Мinsk, 1952.
- Помнікі старажытнай беларускай пісьменнасці. Minsk, 1975.
- Ułaščyk, Mikałaj, Очерки по археографии и источниковедению истории и Белоруссии феодального периода. Moscow, 1973.

=== Reference works ===
- Chemerytskyi, Vyacheslav Antonovych, Хроніка Вялікага княства Літоўскага і Жамойцкага // Вялікае княства Літоўскае: энцыклапедыя: у 2 т. Minsk: Беларуская энцыклапедыя [Belarusian Encyclopaedia], 2006. Volume 2, pp. 720.
