= Praise to Vytautas =

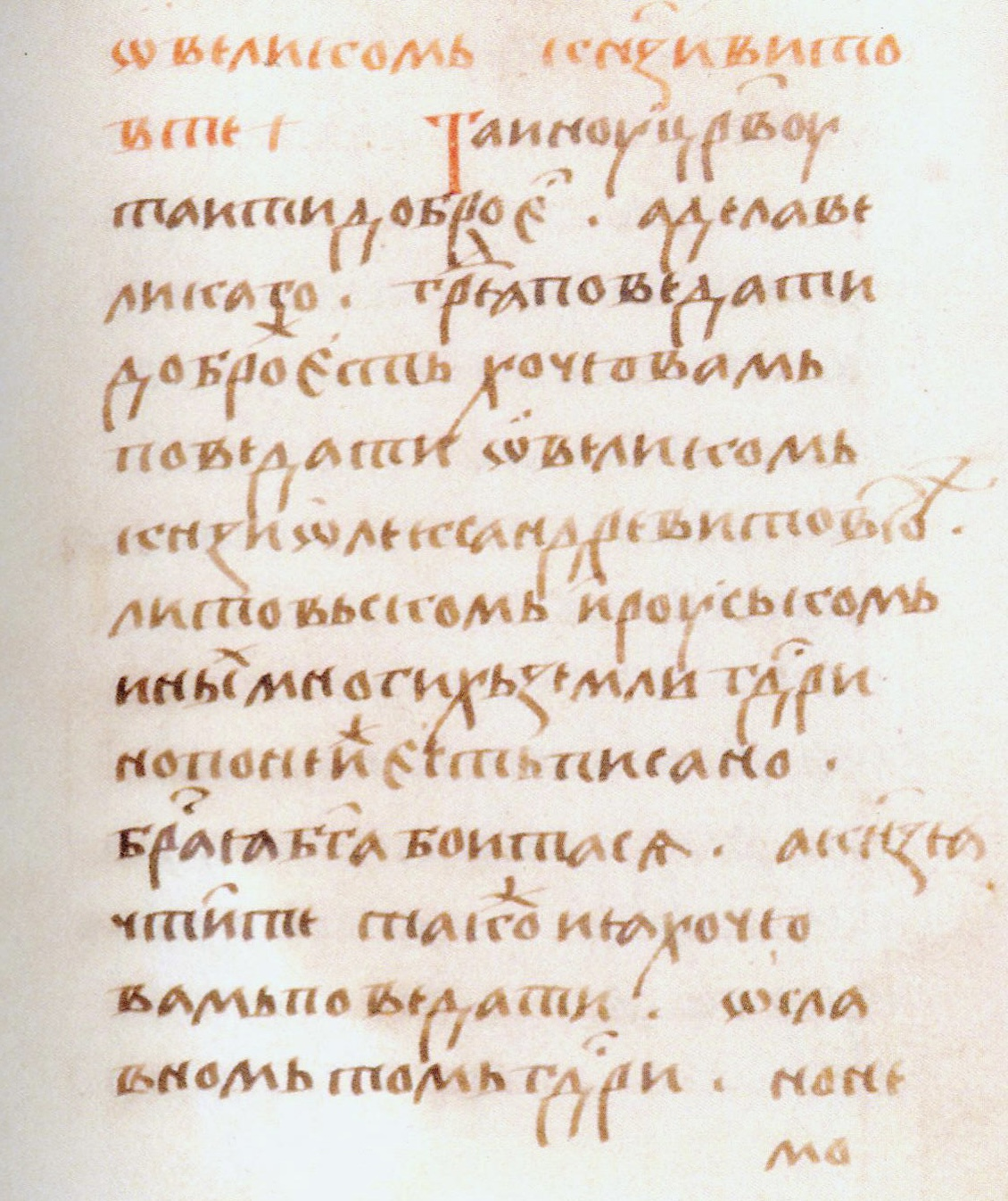
Slutsk Chronicle л.51. (fol.51r): opening of the Praise to Vytautas: [Похвала] o великомь князи Витовте. Таину цареву таити добро есть, a дела великаго господаря поведати добро жь есть. Хочю вамь поведати o великомь князи Олександре ВитовтЂ литовьскомь и руськомь, иных многих земли господари. Но по неи же есть писано: «Братя, бога боитася, a князя чтите». Такожь и я хочю вамь поведати o славномь томь господари, но не мо..." (Note: "Praise to Grand Duke Vytautas. It is good to keep a tsar's secrets; but it is likewise good to tell the deeds of a great sovereign. I want to tell you about the grand Duke Oleksandr Vytautas of Lithuania and Ruthenia, lord of many lands. But it is written: 'Brothers, fear God and honour the duke.' I also want to tell you about that glorious lord, but I cannot...")

Supraśl text of the Praise to Vytautas in PSRL vol. 35 (1980), pp. 58–59.

The Praise to Vytautas (Note: Old East Slavic: Пахвала о великом князи Витовте, romanized: Pakhvala o velikom knjazi Vitovte. Taraškievica and Belarusian: Пахвала́ Ві́таўту, romanized: Pakhvala Vitaŭtu. Polish: Pochwała Witoldowi. Russian: Похвала Витовту, romanized: Pokhvala Vitovtu. Ukrainian: Похвала Вітовту, romanized: Pokhvala Vitovtu.) is a panegyric from the early 15th century, dedicated to Vytautas the Great, who reigned as grand duke of Lithuania from 1392 to 1430, written in the Belarusian variety of Early Ruthenian. It is considered one of the first works of Ruthenian secular panegyric prose.

== Manuscript editions ==
The text has been preserved in four manuscript editions:

1. (1428): included in a manuscript translation of the Ascetic Words by Isaac the Syrian, rewritten in Smolensk;
2. (c. 1430): included in the first redaction of the Belarusian-Lithuanian Chronicles, preserved in several manuscripts such as the Supraśl Manuscript and the Slutsk Chronicle (Uvarov Manuscript);
3. (first half of the 16th century): preserved in the short and expanded editions of the Chronicle of the Grand Duchy of Lithuania, Ruthenia and Samogitia;
4. (Ruthenian, abridged, 16th century): found in various historical collections that existed in Russia (Muscovy) in the 16th–18th centuries.

The Praise to Vytautas of 1428 is a private business note-afterword to a book, written by an admirer of Vytautas in Smolensk (which principality had been incorporated into the Grand Duchy of Lithuania by Vytautas in 1404). This apparently original text was written while Vytautas was still alive, and probably commissioned by him personally. The chronicle version of c. 1430 in the Supraśl Manuscript is a personal work of the panegyric genre. While many scholars have supposed that this much more elaborate version of the Praise functioned as Vytautas' posthumous commemoration, Mickūnaitė (2006) argued that "a closer look at the text, along with circumstantial evidence, suggests that it was aimed at glorifying the living ruler". Namely, Vytautas is not spoken about as if he were a deceased person, nor are there any laments in the text. The third edition is a combined abbreviated text of the chronicle edition of the Praise to Vytautas, with the introductory part (the story of Vytautas' coronation) from the Chronicle of Smolensk.

A critical edition of the text was published in PSRL Volume 17 (1907), pp. 417–420; and in PSRL Volume 35 (1980), pp. 58–59. A later version of the Praise was translated into English and published as The West Russian Chronicle's Panegyric on Vitovt, after 1430 in 1972. The incipit of this English translation is: "It is good to keep a tsar's secrets; but it is likewise good to tell the deeds of a great sovereign."

== Contents and style ==
The text praises the "great and wise" knyaz ("prince" or "duke") Vytautas, whom the rulers of Europe serve or befriend. It glorifies the policy of unifying the East Slavic lands led by the Grand Duchy of Lithuania. Mickūnaitė (2006) wrote: "The most vivid manifestation of Vytautas' glory is the vastness of his lands and the honor that other rulers pay him. Among those, many are mentioned, although the list of the Tatar khans is the most extensive."

This duke, Vytautas, ruled over the Grand Duchy of Lithuania and Ruthenia, as well as many other lands, stretching across the entire Rus' land.

– Praise to Vytautas, Supraśl Manuscript text

Starting from the second, more elaborate edition of the text from c. 1430, the central example cited of the power and influence Vytautas wielded is the Congress of Lutsk, which he hosted in 1429, and which was attended by dozens of European monarchs and Tatar khans. The Praise summarises Vytautas' hold over all the lands along the Baltic Sea as follows: "To put it simply, not a single city could be found along the Littoral [во всемь Помори] which would disobey that glorious sovereign." (Note: Supraśl Manuscript text: "...сопроста реку, иже не обретеся во всемь Помори ни град, ни мЂсто, иже бы не приходили к славному господарю Витовъту." ("One/I can honestly/simply say that you will not find a city or town in all of Pomori [lit. "along the Sea"; compare Pomerania and Pomerelia] that would not come to the glorious lord Vitovŭt.") Slutsk Chronicle text: "...спроста реку, иж не обретеся во всемь Помории ни град, ни место, иж бы не прислухали славнаго того господаря Витовта." "I say simply that there is no city or town in all of Pomorii [lit. "along the Sea"; compare Pomerania and Pomerelia] that would not listen to the glorious lord Vitovt."))

According to University of Aberdeen historian Linas Eriksonas (2004), the Praise to Vytautas is "a eulogy to the sovereign in the Byzantine style." He deemed this text to be one of the foundations of the literary heroic traditions in Lithuania, established by "the Orthodox chroniclers who[,] in a line with the Orthodox doctrine of Apostolic Tradition and a strictly adhered hierarchy, came up with the first iconic images of Grand Duke Vytautas and his heroic predecessors."

On the other hand, Mickūnaitė argued, "even a brief glimpse at the Pokhvala [Praise] shows its complete ignorance of Byzantine rhetoric. The few common features include the motifs of the ruler's wisdom and the parallel with water resources used in Byzantine imperial laudations. Otherwise, neither the structure nor the content accords with Menander's rules" on rhetoric that dominated in the Byzantine Empire. Nevertheless, the "function and pompous phrasing places the panegyric to Vytautas closer to Byzantium" than to Russia (Muscovy). Moreover, the Praise was dedicated to a living duke rather than a deceased one, as was common in vitae of Rus' princes.

== Authorship ==
According to Giedre Mickūnaite (2006), the panegyric known as the Praise to Vytautas was originally written in 1428 by Timofey, a scribe of bishop Gerasim of Smolensk. This conclusion is based on the fact that the manuscript of 1428, which is a copy of the text of Isaac the Syrian commissioned by Vytautas, is followed by "an indication of its author, the scribe, his patron, and the commissioner, after which the enumeration of the deeds of the “most glorious sovereign” begins."

== Bibliography ==
=== Primary sources ===
- Shakhmatov, Aleksey Aleksandrovich; Ptaszycki, Stanisław, eds. (1907). Zapadnorusskie letopisi Западнорусские летописи [Western Rus' Chronicles] (in Belarusian, Russian, and Ukrainian). Vol. 17. Saint Petersburg: Typography of Aleksandrov. (in Volume 32 and 35 rebranded Belarusian-Lithuanian Chronicles).
- (critical edition of the Supraśl Manuscript text) Ulashchik, N.N., ed. (1980a). Bilorusjko-lytovsjki litopysy: Suprasljsjkyj litopys Білорусько-литовські літописи: Супрасльський літопис [The Belarusian–Lithuanian Chronicles: The Supraśl Chronicle]. Complete Collection of Rus' Chronicles (PSRL) (in Russian, Ukrainian, and Belarusian). Vol. 35. Moscow: Nauka / Izbornyk. pp. 36–67. – The text of the Praise to Vytautas can be found on л.78–л.82 (folio 78r–82r).
- (critical edition of the Slutsk Chronicle text) Ulashchik, N.N., ed. (1980c). Bilorusjko-lytovsjki litopysy: Slucjkyj litopys Білорусько-литовські літописи: Слуцький літопис [The Belarusian–Lithuanian Chronicles: The Slutsk Chronicle]. Complete Collection of Rus' Chronicles (PSRL) (in Russian, Ukrainian, and Belarusian). Vol. 35. Moscow: Nauka / Izbornyk. pp. 68–84. – The text of the Praise to Vytautas can be found on л.51–л.58об. (folio 51r–58v).
- (English translation) Vernadsky, George, ed. (1972). "The West Russian Chronicle's Panegyric on Vitovt, after 1430". A Source Book for Russian History. From Early Times to 1917. Vol. 1: Early Times to the Late Seventeenth Century. New Haven and London: Yale University Press. pp. 94–95.

=== Literature ===
- Akhrymenka, P. P.; Larchanka, M. R. (1968). Старажытная беларуская літаратура [Old Belarusian Literature] (in Belarusian). Minsk: Vysheysha shkola.
- Dabrynin, Mikhail Kuzmich (1952). Беларуская літаратура. Старажытны перыяд [Belarusian Literature. Old Period] (in Belarusian). Minsk: State Publishing House of the BSSR.
- Pshirkov, Yulian Sergeyevich, ed. (1975). Помнікі старажытнай беларускай пісьменнасці [Monuments of Old Belarusian Writing] (in Belarusian). Minsk: Yanka Kupala Institute of Literature of the National Academy of Sciences of Belarus / Science and Technology.
- Ułaščyk, Mikałaj (1973). Очерки по археографии и источниковедению истории Белоруссии феодального периода [Essays on archaeography and source studies of the history of Belarus during the feudal period] (in Russian). Moscow: Nauka.
- Mickūnaite, Giedre (2006). "Vytautas creating his own image". Making a Great Ruler: Grand Duke Vytautas of Lithuania. Budapest / New York City: CEU Press. pp. 19–116. ISBN 978-9637326585.
