= Demetrius, Prince of the Tatars =

Demetrius, Prince of the Tatars (Latin: Demetrius princeps Tartarorum) was a Mongol or Tatar ruler in the second half of the 14th century.

== In primary sources ==
Demetrius was mentioned in medieval chronicles and in a Hungarian royal charter of 1368. According to the Lithuanian-Ruthenian Chronicle, preserved in the Codex Suprasliensis and other codices, Algirdas, Grand Duke of Lithuania, invaded Podolia in 1363 and 1364 and defeated three Tatar chieftains – Kutlug Bey, Hacı Bey and Demetrius – in the Battle of Blue Waters in 1362 or 1363. Algirdas's invasion was the first military campaign that a European power launched in the territory of the Golden Horde.

When Grand Prince [Algirdas] was Lord of the Ruthenian land, he went into the steppes with the Lithuanian army, and at the "Blue Waters" he defeated the Tatars, which included three brothers, [Hacı Bey], [Kutlug Bey], and Demetrius. These three brothers were the heirs of the land of Podolia. From them the collectors [of the Tatars] took tribute.

— Lithuanian-Ruthenian Chronicle

According Latopis Nikonowski the battle was in 1363, according to Latopis Hustyński in 1362.

"Lord Demetrius, Prince of the Tatars" (dominus Demetrius princeps Tartarorum) was mentioned in a royal charter, issued 22 June 1368 by Louis I of Hungary. According to the charter, King Louis granted the merchants who came from Demetrius's country an exemption from paying custom duties in the Kingdom of Hungary in exchange for Demetrius's identical grant for the merchants of Brașov who visited the Tatar prince's country.

== In modern historiography ==
Historian Virgil Ciocîltan describes Demetrius as the "last magnate of Bujak" who emerged in the period of the disintegration of the Golden Horde in the 1340s. According to historian Laurenţiu Rădvan, Demetrius controlled the land between the upper courses of the rivers Prut and Dniester, including the trading ports on the coast of the Black Sea. His title "princeps" shows that Demetrius was an independent ruler who was not subjected to the Khan of the Golden Horde in 1368.

== Bibliography ==
- Ciocîltan, Virgil (2012). The Mongols and the Black Sea Trade in the Thirteenth and Fourteenth Centuries. BRILL. ISBN 978-90-04-22666-1.
- Knoll, Paul W. (1972). The Rise of the Polish Monarchy: Piast Poland in East Central Europe, 1320-1370. The University of Chicago Press. ISBN 0-226-44826-6.
- Rădvan, Laurenţiu (2010). At Europe's Borders: Medieval Towns in the Romanian Principalities. BRILL. ISBN 978-90-04-18010-9.
- Spinei, Victor (1986). Moldavia in the 11th–14th Centuries. Editura Academiei Republicii Socialiste Româna.
