= Battle of Blue Waters =

Battle between Lithuania and the Golden Horde

- Part of the Great Troubles and Moldavian–Horde Wars
Date	Autumn 1362 or 1363
Location	Syniukha River 48°39′30″N 30°47′00″E
Result	Lithuanian–Moldavian victory
Territorial changes	Principality of Kiev became part of the Grand Duchy of Lithuania; Principality of Moldavia breaks off from the Golden Horde's influence

Belligerents
Grand Duchy of Lithuania; Principality of Moldavia	Golden Horde

Commanders and leaders
Algirdas; Fyodor Koriatovych; Bogdan I	Abdallah; Kutlug Bey †; Hacı Bey †; Demetrius

Strength
20,000–25,000	10,000–20,000

Casualties and losses
Unknown	Heavy

The Battle of Blue Waters (Note: Lithuanian: Mūšis prie Mėlynųjų Vandenų; Belarusian: Бітва на Сініх Водах, romanized: Bitva na Sinikh Vodakh; Ukrainian: Битва на Синіх Водах, romanized: Bytva na Synikh Vodakh; Romanian: Bătălia de la Apele Albastre.) was fought at some time in the autumn of 1362 or 1363 on the banks of the Syniukha River, a left tributary of the Southern Bug, between the armies of the Grand Duchy of Lithuania and Principality of Moldavia against the Golden Horde. The Lithuanians won a decisive victory and finalized their conquest of the Principality of Kiev, while the Moldavians managed to end their dependence on the Golden Horde.

== Background ==
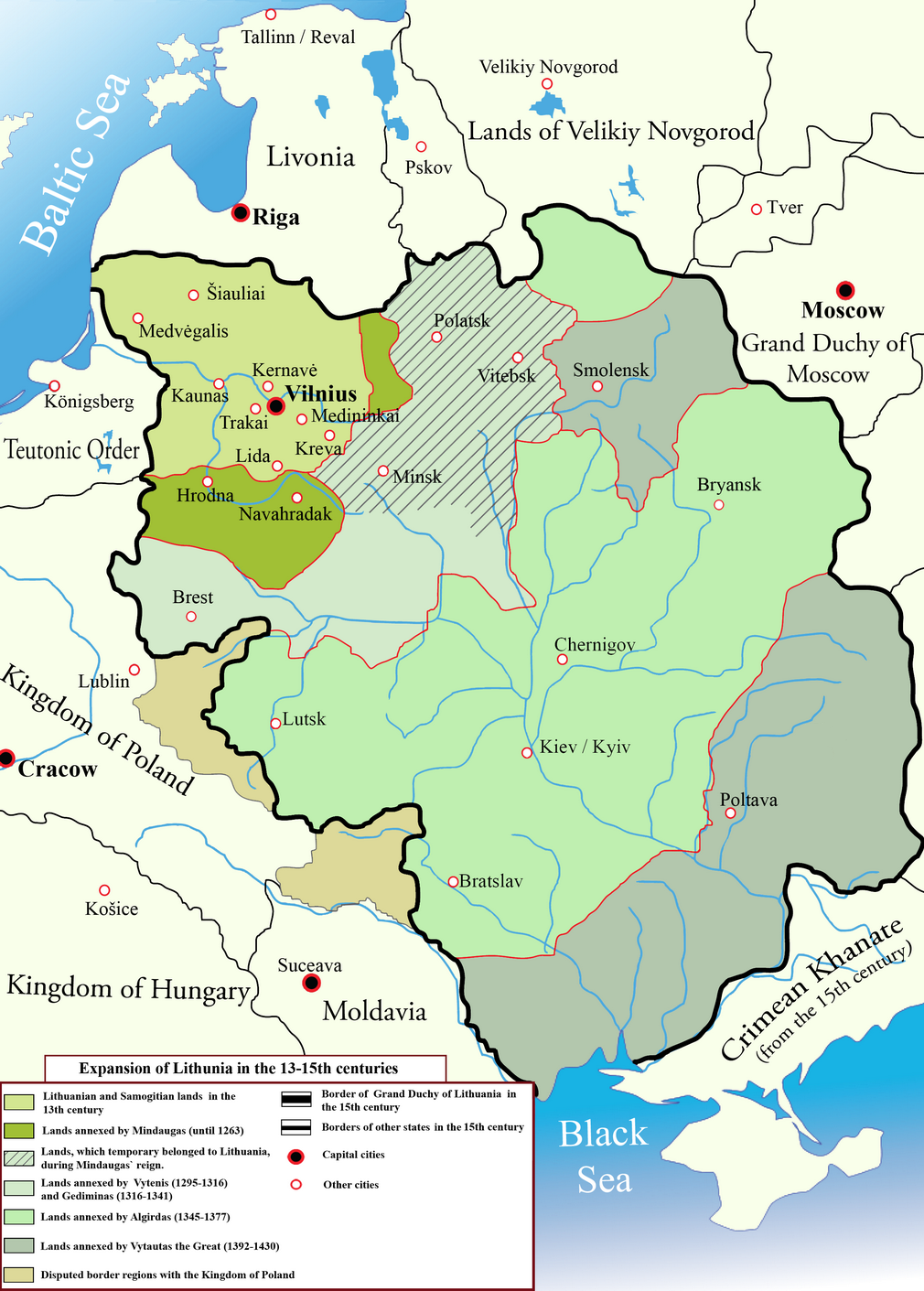
Map of the Grand Duchy of Lithuania, at its greatest extent from the 13th to 15th centuries.

After the death of its ruler Berdi Beg Khan in 1359 the Golden Horde experienced a series of succession disputes and wars that lasted two decades (1359–81). The Horde began fracturing into separate districts (ulus). Taking advantage of internal disorder within the Horde, Grand Duke Algirdas of Lithuania organized a campaign into Tatar lands. He aimed to secure and expand the southern territories of the Grand Duchy of Lithuania, particularly the Principality of Kiev. Kiev had already come under semi-Lithuanian control after the Battle on the Irpin River in early 1320s, but still paid tribute to the Horde.

== Battle ==
In 1362 or 1363, Algirdas marched between the lower Dnieper and the Southern Bug. First, Algirdas captured the remaining territories of the Principality of Chernigov – the bulk of the territory, including the capital in Bryansk, fell under Lithuanian control around 1357–1358. The Lithuanians then attacked Korshev (Коршов), an unidentified fortress located in the upper reaches of the Bystraya Sosna River, a tributary of the Don River. It is believed that Algirdas further conquered territories of the former Principality of Pereyaslavl. The area belonged to Crimean ulus which was engaged in a campaign against New Sarai and could not organize effective resistance. In autumn, the Lithuanian army moved west and crossed the Dnieper River towards Podolia. Three Tatar beys of Podolia gathered an army to resist the invasion. It is believed that the armies met at present-day Torhovytsia (Ukrainian: Торговиці). At the time the town was known as Yabgu in Turkic, or viceroy, regent town, and Sinie Vody in Russian, or Blue Waters.

A short description of the battle survives only from late and not very reliable work of Maciej Stryjkowski, published in 1582. According to Stryjkowski, Algirdas organized his army into six groups and arranged them in a half circle. The Tatars started the battle by hurling arrows into the sides of the Lithuanian formation. Such attacks had little effect and the Lithuanians and Ruthenians, armed with spears and swords, moved forward and broke the front lines of the Tatar army. Sons of Karijotas with units from Novogrudok attacked Tatar flanks with crossbows. The Tatars could not maintain their formation and broke into a disorganized retreat. Algirdas achieved a decisive victory.

== Aftermath ==
The victory brought Kiev and a large part of present-day Ukraine, including sparsely populated Podolia and Dykra, under the control of the expanding Grand Duchy of Lithuania. Lithuania also gained access to the Black Sea. Algirdas left his son Vladimir in Kiev. After taking Kiev, Lithuania became a direct neighbor and rival of the Grand Duchy of Moscow. Podolia was entrusted to Aleksander, Yuri, Konstantin, and Fyodor – Karijotas' sons, Algirdas' nephews, and commanders during the battle. The Principality of Moldavia asserted their independence from the Golden Horde by supporting Lithuania in this battle. Moldavian voivode Bogdan I continued to collaborate with Lithuania.

== Historiography ==
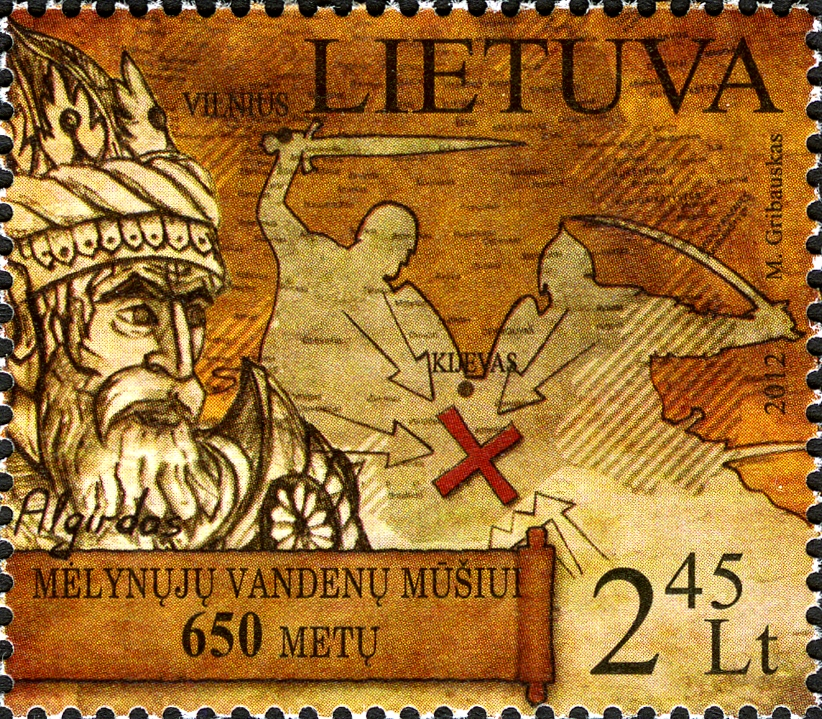
2012 commemorative stamp issued in Lithuania

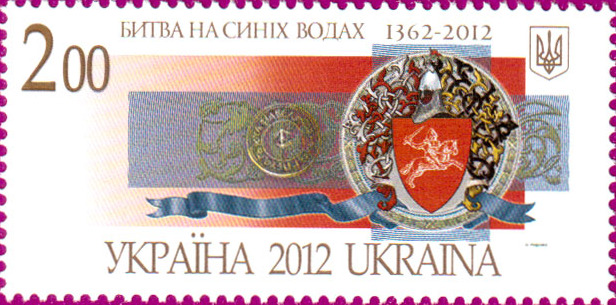
2012 stamp of Ukraine dedicated to the Battle of Blue Waters

The battle has received comparatively little attention from historians. Some of it is attributed to lack of historical sources. It received a handful of fragmentary mentions in Ruthenian and Russian chronicles. The most important source of information is the Tale about Podolia, which was incorporated into the Lithuanian Chronicles. The Tale was produced by the Lithuanians sometime around the Lithuanian Civil War (1432–38) when Lithuania fought against Poland for control of Podolia. As such, the Tale is a piece of political propaganda written to support Lithuanian claims to Podolia and exalt the virtues of Karijotas's sons rather than give an accurate account of the military campaign. Most Slavic historians tended to minimize the importance of the battle. Lithuanian historian Tomas Baranauskas claims that Russian historians chose to emphasize the Muscovite-led victory against the Tatars in the 1380 Battle of Kulikovo, while Polish historians did not want to emphasize Lithuanian claims to Podolia. For example, Jan Długosz did not mention the battle at all.

In the 20th century, however, interest in the battle increased. Polish historian Stefan Maria Kuczyński produced a dedicated study Sine Wody in 1965; Lithuanian Romas Batūra published Lietuva tautų kovoje prieš Aukso ordą. Nuo Batu antplūdžio iki mūšio prie Mėlynųjų Vandenų in 1975; and Ukrainian Felix Shabuldo published numerous articles. Ukrainian historians held two conferences in Kropyvnytskyi in 1997 and 1998. The resulting collection of articles was published by the Institute of History of Ukraine in 2005 (ISBN 966-02-3563-1). In 2012, another conference, dedicated to the 650th anniversary of the battle, was held by the Vytautas Magnus University.

In 2022, the national bank of Belarus issued a commemorative coin dedicated to the Battle of Blue Waters with a portrait of the Grand Duke Algirdas.
