= Supraśl Manuscript =

1519 Ruthenian manuscript

- f. 115, no. 143, RAS History Institute, Saint Petersburg
- Type: first-redaction Lithuanian Chronicles
- Date: 1519
- Place of origin: Supraśl Orthodox Monastery
- Language: Ruthenian (Note: And some later short, unrelated entries and poems in Polish and Latin.)
- Scribe: Hryhoriy Ivanovych
- Author: Szymon Ivanovych Odincewicz
- Patron: Odintsevychi
- Material: thick white paper; linden boards covered with leather
- Condition: paper thoroughly turned yellow; leather heavily worn
- Script: Cyrillic (Note: But Latin script in the Polish and Latin bits and pieces.)
- Contents: 175 sheets
- Discovered: 1822

The Supraśl Manuscript (Note: Polish: Rękopis suprasielski. Belarusian: Супрасльскі рукапіс, romanized: Suprasĺski rukapis. Ukrainian: Супрасльський рукопис, romanized: Suprasljsjkyj rukopys. Also known pars pro toto as the Supraśl Chronicle, or the Supraśl Codex, not to be confused with the 10th-century Codex Suprasliensis in Middle Bulgarian.) is a codex compiled in 1519. It has 175 folios in total. On folios 3r up to 108v of the manuscript, it contains a compilation of first-redaction Lithuanian Chronicles (sometimes dubbed the "Supraśl Chronicle"), that are estimated to have been originally written in Early Ruthenian in the mid-15th century. It also contains copies of the Kyiv Caves (Pechersk) Patericon and the Wiślica Statutes of Casimir the Great, amongst other things. The codex was rediscovered in 1822 in the Supraśl Orthodox Monastery (near Białystok in present-day Poland, close to Belarus).

== Structure ==
Legend:

- fol. = folio, sheet.
- r. = recto, the first (right) side of a folio. Corresponds to "лл" ("лицевая сторона" litsevaja storona, "front side" or "face side").
- v. = verso, the second (left) side of a folio. Corresponds to "об." ("оборотная сторона" oborotnaja storona, "reverse side" or "back side").

Fol.	Notes
1	Gospel readings index; unrelated to chronicles.
1a – 2v	Genealogy of Odintsevychi
3r–72v	Incipit: Избрание лЂтописания изложено въкратце [Izbranie lětopisanija izlozheno vŭkrattse. "A Selection of the Chronicle Set Out in Brief."] Сказание o вЂрных святых князеи руських. [Skazanie o virnykh svjatykh knyazei rus'kikh. "The Tale/Legend of the Faithful Holy Princes of Rus'."] This section contains entries from 854 (Calling of the Varangians) until 1427. It contains data of an all-Rus' nature, and is very detailed on the 14th and 15th century.
72v	Excerpt from the Primary Chronicle (PVL) of 10 lines ("The Dnieper River flows near the Poneshskoye Sea...").
72v – 87r	An untitled section dedicated mainly to grand duke Vytautas the Great.: This part reports on the failed coronation of Vytautas and his death; on the accession of Švitrigaila and his struggle with Sigismund Kęstutaitis; then the Praise to Vytautas.; At the end there are several reports of events (1432–1445) in/about Smolensk.; The section ends in 1446 with the blinding of Vasily II of Moscow.
87r – 108r	Chronicler of the Grand Dukes of Lithuania (in cinnabar colour): a list of the sons of the Grand Duke Gediminas; Vytautas's reign in Lithuania; 102r – 108r: The Tale about Podolia.; Explicit (108r): ляхове, пана Долькгирда из города ис Каменца созвали на раду к собе и до рады не допустивши самого иняли и огьрабили, и Каменець засели, и все тое забрали, што Подолъскои земли держать. (Note: ["The Poles summoned Pan Dolkgird from the city of Kamenets to a council to themselves and, not allowing him to reach the council, they seized and robbed him, and settled in Kamenets, and took everything that the Podolian [Podolsk] lands needed to be kept."])
108v – 125r	Wiślica Statutes of Casimir the Great (originally composed 1346–1362 in Latin), translated into Ruthenian.
125v – 126r	A genealogy of dukes of Masovia, and a complaint to the king about the starost of Zamość (without end). Written in Old Belarusian with various 17th-century handwritings and inks.
127r – 172r	Kyiv Caves (Pechersk) Patericon
173r – 174v	Various random writings in Belarusian and Polish; some Polish poetry.
175	Gospel readings index; unrelated to chronicles.

== Contents ==
Critical edition of the Supraśl Manuscript by Obolensky (1836)

In 1836, M. A. Obolensky published a critical edition titled Супрасльская рукопись, содержащая Новгородскую и Киевскую сокращенные летописи [Suprasl'skaia rukopis', soderzhashchaia Novgorodskuiu i Kievskuiu sokrashchennye letopisi, "The Supraśl Manuscript, containing the shortened Novgorodian and Kievan chronicles"].

Contrary to earlier scholarly belief, the Supraśl Chronicle does not contain an account of a 10-week-long 1240 siege of Kiev.

== Bibliography ==
=== Critical editions ===
- Супрасльская летопись [Suprasl'skaia letopis'; "The Supraśl Chronicle"], eds S. L. Ptashitsky and A. A. Shakhmatov, in PSRL, Moscow, 2008, vol. 17, col. 25.
- M. A. Obolensky (ed.), Супрасльская рукопись, содержащая Новгородскую и Киевскую сокращенные летописи [Suprasl'skaia rukopis', soderzhashchaia Novgorodskuiu i Kievskuiu sokrashchennye letopisi, "The Supraśl Manuscript, containing the shortened Novgorodian and Kievan chronicles"] (1836). Moscow.
- Moscow, Российский государственный архив древних актов [Rossiiskii gosudarstvennyi arkhiv drevnikh aktov] (RGADA), f. 181, op. 1, ch. 1, no. 21/26.
- Moscow, State Historical Museum, Synodal Collection of Manuscripts [Sinodal'noye sobranie rukopisej], no. 154.
- A. N. Nasonov, ‘Vvedenie’, in PSRL, vol. 5/1, pp. 9–44 (pp. 12–13)
- Ol'ga L. Novikova, К истории изучения Супрасльского летописного сборника в первой трети XIX в. [K istorii izucheniia Suprasl'skogo letopisnogo sbornika pervoi treti XIX v., "On the history of studying the Supraśl chronicle collection in the first third of the 19th century."], in Proceedings of the Department of Old Rus' Literature [Trudy Otdela drevnerusskoi literatury], St Petersburg, 1996, vol. 50, pp. 384–86.
- Ulashchik, N.N., ed. (1980a). Bilorusjko-lytovsjki litopysy: Suprasljsjkyj litopys Білорусько-литовські літописи: Супрасльський літопис [The Belarusian–Lithuanian Chronicles: The Supraśl Chronicle]. Complete Collection of Rus' Chronicles (PSRL) (in Belarusian). Vol. 35. Moscow: Nauka / Izbornyk. p. 306.

=== Literature ===
- Maiorov, Alexander V. (2016). "The Mongolian Capture of Kiev: The Two Dates". The Slavonic and East European Review. 94 (4): 702–714. doi:10.5699/slaveasteurorev2.94.4.0702. JSTOR 10.5699/slaveasteurorev2.94.4.0702.
- Slipushko, Oksana (2022). "Lietuvos ir Rusios kronikos mąstymo paradigma vėlyvaisiais viduramžiais / Lithuanian-Ruthenian Chronicle Paradigm of Thinking in the Late Middle Ages". LOGOS. 113: 18–25. doi:10.24101/logos.2022.69.
- Ulashchik, N.N., ed. (1980b). "Супрасльская летопись (опис)" [Supraśl Chronicle (description)]. Bilorusjko-lytovsjki litopysy Білорусько-литовські літописи [The Belarusian–Lithuanian Chronicles]. Complete Collection of Rus' Chronicles (PSRL) (in Russian). Vol. 35. Moscow: Nauka / Izbornyk. pp. 118–127. Archived from the original on 8 August 2025.
