= Lithuanian Chronicles =

Chronicles of the Grand Duchy of Lithuania

The Lithuanian Chronicles, (Note: Lithuanian: Lietuvos metraščiai; Belarusian: Літоўскія летапісы, romanized: Litoŭakiya letapisy; Ukrainian: Литовська хроніка, romanized: Lytovsjka khronika.) also known as the Belarusian-Lithuanian Chronicles, (Note: Belarusian: Беларуска-літоўскія летапісы, romanized: Byelaruska-litoŭakiya letapisy; Russian: Белорусско-литовские летописи, romanized: Belorussko-litovsie letopisi; Ukrainian: Білорусько-литовські літописи, romanized: Bilorusjko-lytovsjki litopysy.) are three redactions of chronicles compiled in the Grand Duchy of Lithuania. All redactions were written in the Ruthenian language and served the needs of Lithuanian patriotism.

The first edition, compiled in the 1420s, glorified Vytautas the Great and supported his side in power struggles. The second redaction, prepared in the first half of the 16th century, started the myth of Lithuanian Roman origin: it gave a fanciful genealogy of Palemon, a noble from the Roman Empire who founded the Grand Duchy. This noble origin of Lithuanians was important in cultural rivalry with the Kingdom of Poland. The third redaction, known as the Bychowiec Chronicle, elaborated even further on the legend, but also provided some useful information about the second half of the 15th century. The three redactions, the first known historical accounts produced within the Grand Duchy, gave rise to the historiography of Lithuania. All medieval historians used these accounts, that survived in over 30 known manuscripts, as basis for their publications. Some of the myths created in the chronicles persisted even to the beginning of the 20th century.

== First or short redaction ==
The first or the short redaction (also known as Chronicle of the Grand Dukes of Lithuania or Letopisec Litovskii) was compiled sometime in the 1420s in Smolensk, when Vytautas the Great hoped to be crowned as King of Lithuania. The first redaction survived only from later manuscripts and compilations. The earliest known compilation was prepared in Smolensk around 1446 by bishop Gerasim and his clerk Timofei.

=== Structure ===
The compilation included:

- Dis ist Witoldes sache wedir Jagalan und Skargalan, the earliest known historical account produced in the Grand Duchy of Lithuania in Middle Low German. It is a complaint and memorial written by Vytautas in 1390 during the Lithuanian Civil War (1389–1392). It detailed his power struggles against cousins Jogaila and Skirgaila in 1379–1390 and supported his claims to his patrimony in Trakai and title of Grand Duke of Lithuania. Two translations of this document survive:

- In Latin: Origo regis Jagyelo et Witholdi ducum Lithuanie from the 15th century; and
- In Ruthenian: Litovskomu rodu pochinok from the 14th century. Later this document was expanded to include events up to 1396. It formed the backbone of the first chronicle.

- The Praise to Vytautas, written in 1428 by Timofey, scribe of bishop Gerasim of Smolensk;
- The Tale about Podolia, written in 1431–1435 to support the Lithuanian claims to Podolia against Poland in the Lithuanian Civil War;
- A description of power struggles between Švitrigaila and Sigismund Kęstutaitis during the Lithuanian Civil War (1432–1438);
- A short summary of Moscow's chronicles (854–1428); and
- The latest events in Smolensk (1431–1445).

=== Manuscripts ===
The compilation also did not survive in its original state. It is known from several manuscripts:

- Supraśl Manuscript, preserved in a 1519 copy found in the Supraśl Orthodox Monastery; the chronicle texts in it are believed to have been written in the middle of the 15th century
- Chronicle of Avraamka or Vilnius Manuscript, written by a Smolensk monk named Avraamka in 1495, found in Polotsk in 1866, and kept in the Wroblewski Library of the Lithuanian Academy of Sciences in Vilnius.
- Slutsk Chronicle or Uvarov Manuscript, dated to the 16th century, probably originated in the region of Slutsk
- Academic Manuscript, written in the first half of the 16th century, found in Vologda, and published in 1903, is incomplete
- Nikifor Manuscript or Chronicle, belonged to the Holy Spirit Cathedral in Minsk and was published by Sergey Belokurov in 1898, is incomplete

== Second redaction ==
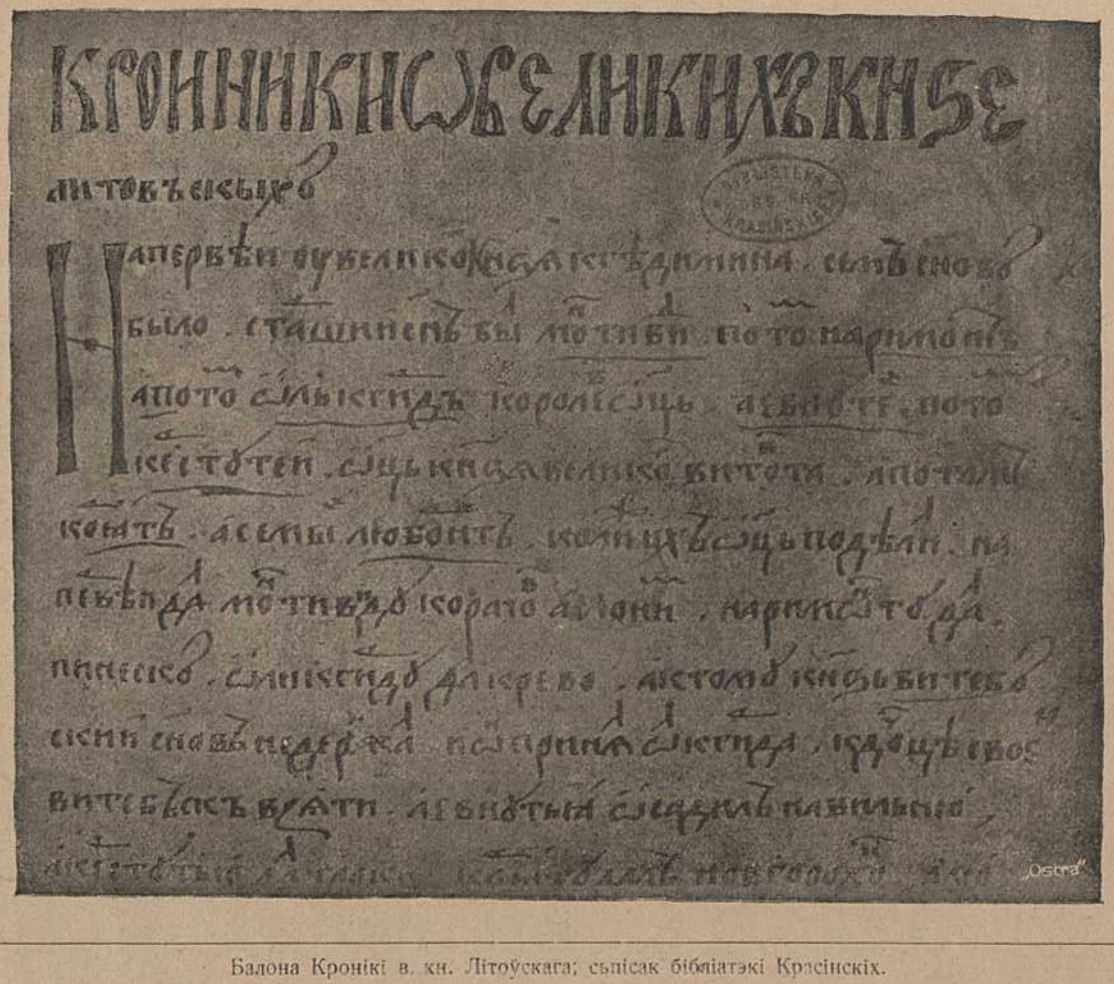
1925 facsimile fragment of the Krasinski manuscript; the original was lost when the Krasiński Library was destroyed in October 1944 during the Destruction of Warsaw.

The second, more extensive, redaction (also known as Chronicle of the Grand Duchy of Lithuania and Samogitia) was compiled in the second half of the 15th and the beginning of the 16th century (the final version probably came into existence around the 1520s at the court of Albertas Goštautas). The redaction traced back the foundations of the Lithuanian state to the 1st century, when legendary Palemon escaped from Roman Empire and settled at the mouth of Dubysa. He founded the Palemonids dynasty and became the first ruler of Lithuania. This legendary part was then followed by the revised first redaction, detailing the lineage of the Gediminids. Mindaugas, the first King of Lithuania crowned in 1253, and other earlier historically attested dukes were skipped entirely. The elaborate story that Lithuanians were of noble Roman origins had no historical basis and was discarded by modern historians as nothing more than a myth.

While many modern historians discount the text as useless, it can still provide useful bits and pieces of Lithuanian history as it incorporates many garbled fragments of earlier, now lost, documents and chronicles. Also, the mythical Palemon is a good evidence of political tensions and cultural ideology of the Lithuanian nobles in the 16th century. This myth served Lithuanian interests in conflicts with Poland and Muscovy. Poland, then in personal union with Lithuania, claimed that it brought civilization to this barbaric pagan land. By creating fanciful genealogies, linking Lithuanians with noble Romans, the Lithuanian nobility could counter these claims and demand political independence.

This redaction rarely included dates and contained several independent stories that were cherished by 19th century nationalists: legends how Gediminas founded Vilnius because of his dreams of Iron Wolf, how Kęstutis took pagan priestess Birutė for his wife, how Vytautas lavishly treated his guests at the Conference of Lutsk in 1429, etc. Among them were some factual stories, including Algirdas' three sieges of Moscow. This format differed significantly from other Slavic chronicles that tended to list inter-related events year-by-year. The second redaction also considerably trimmed and fragmented parts about Ruthenia and the Principality of Moscow; thus the text became primarily about Lithuania. The chronicle was popular and often copied. It shaped the political mentality of the Lithuanian nobility, formed the basis for the Lithuanian historiography until the dawn of the 20th century, and inspired many literary works.

Several manuscripts are known:

- Krasiński Manuscript, written in the early 16th century, found in a collection of the Krasiński family in Warsaw, destroyed in 1944 during World War II. Before its destruction, several scholarly studies of the manuscript were published, and several critical editions of its text had been published, including by A. F. Bychkov (1893), and PSRL vol. 17 (1907).
- Archaeological Society Manuscript, written in the early 16th century.
- Olszew/Alševa manuscript, written in 1550 by a likely native Lithuanian speaker, found in a Chomiński library in Alševa
- Raczyński Manuscript or Poznań Manuscript, written around 1580, gifted by Edward Raczyński to the Raczyński Library in Poznań
- Evreinov Manuscript, written in mid-16th century
- Rumyantsev Manuscript, written in the second half of the 17th century; contains entries until the year 1567, first published by the Rumyantsev Museum in 1902.

== Third or broad redaction ==
The third and most extensive redaction is known as the Bychowiec Chronicle. It is based on the second redaction. It is believed that this redaction was prepared around the same time as the second redaction with support from Albertas Goštautas. The only known version was discovered in a manor owned by Aleksander Bychowiec and was published in full by Teodor Narbutt in 1846. This chronicle was updated to include events up to 1574. Initially there were doubts if the chronicle is authentic and some suggested that Narbutt falsified it. The doubts were inspired by its sudden discovery and its peculiar similarity with the chronicles of Maciej Stryjkowski; also Narbutt is suspected to have falsified several other historical documents. However, new evidence came to light that portions of the chronicle were published in 1830. Historians now suggest that similarity with Stryjkowski's works resulted from using the same document, maybe even the original third redaction, as the source. Further, in 2011, Lithuanian historians discovered a fragment (about one-fifth of the original) of the third redaction at the National Archives in Kraków and published it in 2018.

The patriotic themes were even more prevalent than in the second redaction. It continued to elaborate on the Palemon legend: to improve chronology Palemon was moved to the 5th century Rome, devastated by Attila the Hun, and Mindaugas and other historical dukes were incorporated into the legend. It also concentrated more on the Catholic Church than earlier revisions, which paid closer attention to Eastern Orthodoxy. It is an important source for the late 15th century events, especially years of Alexander Jagiellon.

== Publication ==
The popularity of the Chronicle of Poland, Lithuania, Samogitia and all of Ruthenia, published by Maciej Stryjkowski in 1582, pushed the old handwritten Lithuanian chronicles into obscurity. They were rediscovered with the advent of professional historiography in the late 18th and early 19th centuries when historians began to critically analyze primary sources to verify various claims. That necessitated the publication of primary sources. The first Lithuanian Chronicle, the Supraśl Manuscript, was published in 1823 by Ignacy Daniłowicz. In 1846, Teodor Narbutt published the Bychowiec Chronicle. Other historians published other manuscripts that they had found. In 1860s, the Archaeographic Commission became interested in collecting and publishing all known manuscripts of the Lithuanian Chronicles. Twelve manuscripts were published in 1907 as volume 17 of the Complete Collection of Russian Chronicles as West Russian Chronicles (Russian: Западнорусские летописи), which became the standard reference. The collection, newly compiled and edited by Mikałaj Ułaščyk, was published as volumes 32 (1975) and 35 (1980) of the Complete Collection. However, despite the discovery of several other manuscripts since 1907, the new volumes did not include them.

== Bibliography ==
- Raffensperger, Christian; Ostrowski, Donald (2023). The Ruling Families of Rus: Clan, Family and Kingdom. London: Reaktion Books. p. 309. ISBN 978-1-78914-745-2. (e-book)
