= Izbornyk =

Ukrainian history website

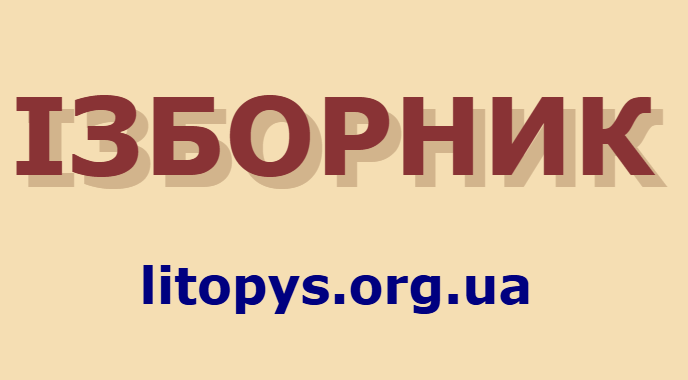
Izbornyk logo

Izbornyk (Ukrainian: Ізборник), known from its URL litopys.org.ua, is a digital library project assembling old Ukrainian literature. The digital library carries the subtitle "History of Ukraine 9-18th centuries. Primary sources and interpretation". The website has been online since 21 August 2001, originally at the URL izbornyk.org.ua, and later exclusively at litopys.org.ua. Izbornyk plays an important role in Ukrainian studies.

== Scope ==
The project is a collection of major works on the history of Kyivan Rus', Ruthenia, the Cossack Hetmanate and Ukraine.

The project covers the following main subjects: chronicles, linguistics, history, old Ukrainian literature, Taras Shevchenko, political science, literary studies, grammar and lexicons, historical maps.

== History ==
The idea behind the project is to collect as many works of Ukrainian writing as possible. Its goal is not simply to collect texts from various times and by various authors at random, but rather to place these against the backdrop of culture and history. This holistic process aims to make clear the unity, heredity and identity of Ukrainian literature, despite obvious gaps in the linguistic code and breaks in tradition.

This is the background of the annals, chronicles and historical documents collected in the main section of the page: "Chronicles" (Літописи). Among other things, digitised versions of critical editions previously published in print as part of the Complete Collection of Rus' Chronicles (PSRL) are republished here. The "Chronicles" section became so extensive that the mirror site litopys.org.ua was set up to relieve the load on the main site, izbornyk.org.ua. Later, the entire website was moved to the server litopys.org.ua.

== Selected works ==
- History of the Ruthenians
- Hypatian Codex, containing the Primary Chronicle, Kyivan Chronicle and Galician–Volhynian Chronicle
- Laurentian Codex, containing the Primary Chronicle and Suzdalian Chronicle
- Novgorod First Chronicle in various editions
- Lithuanian Chronicles
- Cossack Chronicles such as the Samiilo Velychko Chronicle, Eyewitness Chronicle and Hrabianka Chronicle
- Description of Ukraine by French military engineer Guillaume Le Vasseur de Beauplan
