= Mikałaj Ułaščyk =

Belarusian historian and archaeologist (1906-1986)

Mikałaj Ułaščyk (Belarusian language: Мікалай Улашчык Mikalai Ulashchyk; Russian: Николай Николаевич Улащик; February 14, 1906 – November 22, 1986) was a Belarusian academic historian and archaeologist known for significant contributions to the research in the medieval history of Belarus.

== Biography ==
He was born in the village of Vickaŭščyna close to Minsk. His birthplace later became a subject of one of his works.

In 1929 Mikałaj Ułaščyk graduated from the Belarusian State University, specialised in history. In 1930 he was arrested by the NKVD together with a large number of Belarusian intellectuals accused of "anti-Soviet activity" and "nationalism" within the framed-up Case of the Union of Liberation of Belarus. He was deported to a labor camp close to Vyatka. After his release in 1935 he was again twice arrested and imprisoned in the following years (1941–1942, 1950–1955) because of his active opposing the official Soviet propagandist historiography.

After the final release he was not able to go back to Belarus and settled in Moscow where since 1955 he worked at the Institute of History of the USSR Academy of Sciences.

Mikałaj Ułaščyk became doctor of sciences and author of numerous works on the History of Belarus and the Grand Duchy of Lithuania related to the research of chronicles, source documents and archaeography in general. He was also the editor of 32nd and 35th volumes of the Full Collection of Russian Chronicles.
