= Rus' chronicles =

Type of medieval Slavic literature

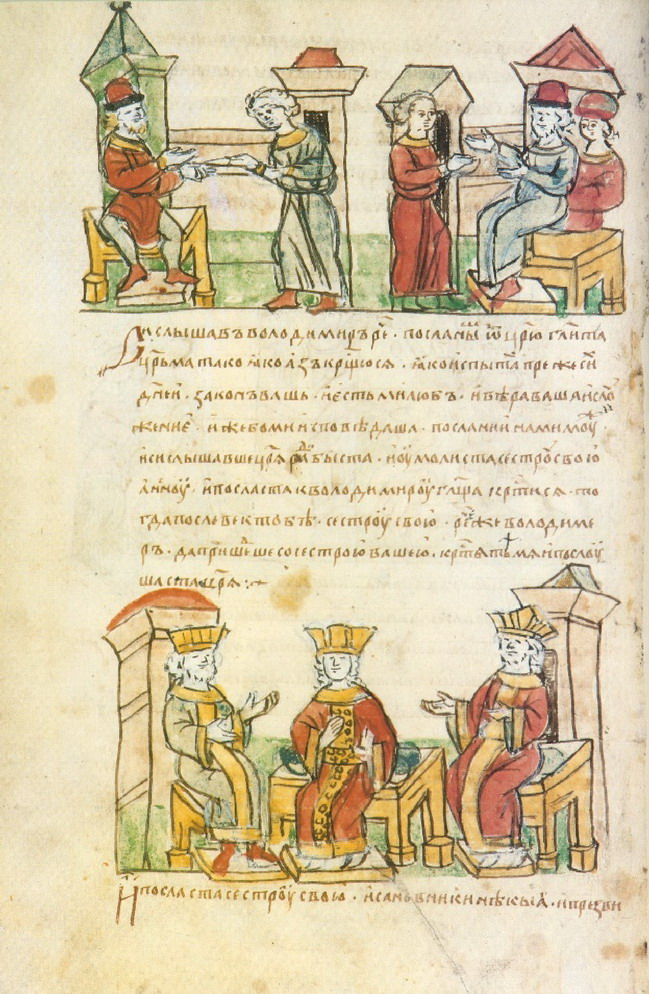
- Illustration from the illuminated 15th-century Radziwiłł Chronicle
- Author(s): Primarily clergy
- Language: Old Church Slavonic and Old East Slavic (later splitting into Ruthenian and early Russian)
- Date: 11–18th centuries
- Genre: History

The Rus' chronicles, or Russian chronicles, were the primary form of historical Old East Slavic literature in Kievan Rus' and its successors. Chronicles were composed from the 11th to the 18th centuries.

In the High Middle Ages, the main centres of chronicle writing were Kiev (modern Kyiv, producing the Primary Chronicle) and Veliky Novgorod (known for the Novgorod First Chronicle, containing elements of the Old Novgorod dialect). In the Late Middle Ages, the former was replaced by Galicia-Volhynia and especially present-day Belarus (where the (Belarusian-)Lithuanian Chronicles were composed in early Ruthenian), while the Novgorod and Pskov Republics continued their tradition, and Vladimir-Suzdal developed its own centres (with Nizhny Novgorod preserving the Laurentian Codex). Chronicles remained the main historical narrative in Muscovy until the mid-16th century reign of Ivan the Terrible, when they were superseded by Byzantine-style chronographs. In 16th- and 17th-century Ukraine, then contested between the Cossack Hetmanate and the Polish–Lithuanian Commonwealth, the Rus' chronicles gave way to what has been termed the "Cossack Chronicles" (Eyewitness, Hrabianka, and Velychko), which were strongly influenced by the new Polish Renaissance historiography (modelled on classical histories).

== Terminology ==
The record of an event usually begins with the words "Въ лѣто ..." (Vŭ lě́to ..., "In the year..."; from them, the terms letopis, litopys and latopis were derived. The chronicles contain historical documents, oral traditions (often of a mystical nature), excerpts from previous chronicles, and text by the chronicler.

== Origin ==
The construction of the oldest Rus' chronicle, until the early 2000s generally accepted by modern scientists, was developed by Alexey Shakhmatov. In Shakhmatov's view, the hypothetical nachal'nyy svod ("original compilation") was compiled c. 1039 (Mikhail Priselkov dated it to 1037) in the Metropolis of Kiev and all Rus'. According to the previous scholarly consensus, the chronicles were originally a complete work and not divided into years.

The Primary Chronicle was written c. 1113. Although Nestor "the Chronicler" of the Kyiv Pechersk Lavra (known from his hagiographies of Boris and Gleb) had traditionally been credited, its authorship is disputed, and the modern consensus is that Nestor was not its author. In 1116, the chronicle was revised by Vydubychi Monastery abbot Sylvester. This edition is preserved as part of the Laurentian Codex. In 1118, its third edition was written by an unknown author on behalf of Novgorod knyaz Mstislav I of Kiev. It was preserved as part of the Hypatian Codex. Dmitry Likhachov, following Nikolay Nikolsky, deduced the beginning of the Rus' chronicle from West Slavic Moravian legends.

Attention, especially in the northern chronicles, was paid to the Old Rus' knyazi; despite the clerical composition of most of the chronicles, many texts depict them as chosen by pagan gods. The Rurikids were emphasized.

Folk legends and stories were sources. Historical distortions were not permitted; according to Shakhmatov, any mystical motives or phenomena in a chronicle occurred because the author believed in their truth or significance.

During the 1850s and 1860s it was thought that the Rus' chronicle originated as annals and evolved into a narrative, a view supported by Michael Sukhomlinov and Izmail Sreznevsky. This theory has been revived by Alexey Gippius and Oleksiy Tolochko, who believe that the chronicle was written as svods (annals) until the Primary Chronicle. The annals were brief, factual, and lacked complex narrative structure. Over time their accuracy increased, dates appeared, the volume of information expanded, and narrative additions were made.

== History ==
The Rus' chronicles began to be systematically prepared during the mid-11th century. There were two centers of chronicle preparation in this early period: Kiev (the capital of early Rus') and Novgorod. The Primary Chronicle, at the beginning of the 12th century, was a combination of Kievan and Novgorodian chronicles (including the Novgorod First Chronicle and survives in the Laurentian and Hypatian codices. Chronicles of the 12th- and 13th-century Kievan Rus' principalities survive in the Hypatian Codex, which includes the Kievan Chronicle (covering 1118 to 1200) and the Galician–Volhynian Chronicle (covering Galicia and Volhynia from 1201 to 1292). Late 12th- and early 13th-century chronicles of Rostov, Pereyaslavl and Vladimir-Suzdal survive in the Laurentian Codex and the Radziwiłł Chronicle.

The late-13th- and early-14th-century Hypatian Codex survives in 15th-to-18th-century сopies. A 1377 copy of the 14th-century Laurentian Codex survives.

The 1375 Tverian annals are part of the Rogozhskiy Chronicle and the 16th-century Tverian Collection. A chronicle related to Cyprian, Metropolitan of Moscow covered up to 1408 and survived as the Trinity Chronicle until the 1812 Fire of Moscow. It was reconstructed by Mikhail Prisyolkov. A chronicle made in Tver c. 1412 contained revisions similar to the late-14th–early-15th-century Trinity Chronicle. The 1430s Novgorodsko-Sofiysky Svod, compiled at the office of the Moscow Metropolitan, may have combined the Sofia First and Novgorod Fourth Chronicles.

The first known Muscovite chronicles appeared during the mid-15th century. A 1470s compilation included the first part of the Yermolin Chronicle. The Kirillo-Belozersky Monastery chronicle contained the second part of the Yermolin Chronicle. The Sofia Second Chronicle is thought to have derived from the Lvov Chronicle. The Ioasaf Chronicle, covering 1437–1520, was made at the end of the 1520s at the office of the Moscow Metropolitan and was a source for the Nikon Chronicle. The multi-volume Illustrated Chronicle of Ivan the Terrible was compiled. Seventeenth- and eighteenth-century chronicles, such as the late-16th-to-18th-century Siberian Chronicles, were local, provincial texts.

14th-to-16th-century Belarusian–Lithuanian Chronicles such as the Supraśl, Bychowiec, and Barkulabovo chronicles continued the tradition of Rus' chronicles.

== Purpose ==
After the 12th and 13th centuries, Rus' chronicles were usually produced by monasteries or at the courts of princes and bishops. Later editors were increasingly concerned with compiling and revising existing writings.

Textual comparison indicates a pronounced political orientation and abrupt changes. Shakhmatov and his colleagues sought to establish the identity and views of their authors and to place a chronicle in its contemporary political struggle. D. S. Likhachev, V. G. Mirzoev, and A. F. Milonov wrote about the educational and didactic purposes of the old Russian chronicles.

According to Igor Danilevsky, the chronicles had an eschatological purpose. Since the second half of the 11th century, they were "books of life" which would appear at the last judgment. According to Timothy Himon, Danilevsky's arguments are indirect. Himon suggests that the chronicles had several goals, including the recording of sacred and unusual events and reinforcing power; the chronicle is considered a tool of political power.

== Сharacteristics ==
The chroniclers were primarily clergy. Rus' chronicles were composed in monasteries, at the courts of princes, the tsars of Moscow and the kings of Galicia-Volhynia, and in the offices of metropolitan bishops. The chronicles (often contradicting each other) typically consisted of collections of short factual entries for the preceding year and speeches and dialogues by princes. The Rus' chronicles contain narratives about the settlement of the Eastern Slavs and neighbouring peoples, how Kievan Rus' was founded and developed, and its diplomatic relations, society, culture, and religion. The chronicler would sometimes provide an extended, embellished narrative on the most significant events of Rus' history.

Aleksey Shakhmatov was the leading expert in the textual criticism of Rus' chronicles. Shakhmatov considered the main part of the chronicle texts svods (collections of records from different sources), with every new chronicle a collection of previous chronicles and newly-added historical records.

Many of the chronicles have become viewed as annals produced in state or church offices. The hypothetical Novgorod Archbishop Chronicle is believed to have been prepared at the office of the Diocese of Novgorod from the 12th to the 14th centuries, and was the basis of the 15th-century Novgorod First Chronicle.

== Sources ==
Sources for the oldest chronicles include Byzantine and South Slavic texts on sacred history and other subjects, the chronicle of George Hamartolos on the Generations of Noah in the Primary Chronicle, legends, legal documents (such as the Rus'–Byzantine Treaties in the Primary Chronicle and a short version of Russkaya Pravda in the Novgorod First Chronicle), and historical records.

== Copies ==
Rus' chronicles survive in codices. Some chronicles have several versions, but others are known from only one copy. Every chronicle was a collection of materials from earlier chronicles. Individual chronicles were revised, shortened or expanded with entries on the events of the last year (or decade), and dozens of such collections may exist.

== Timeline ==
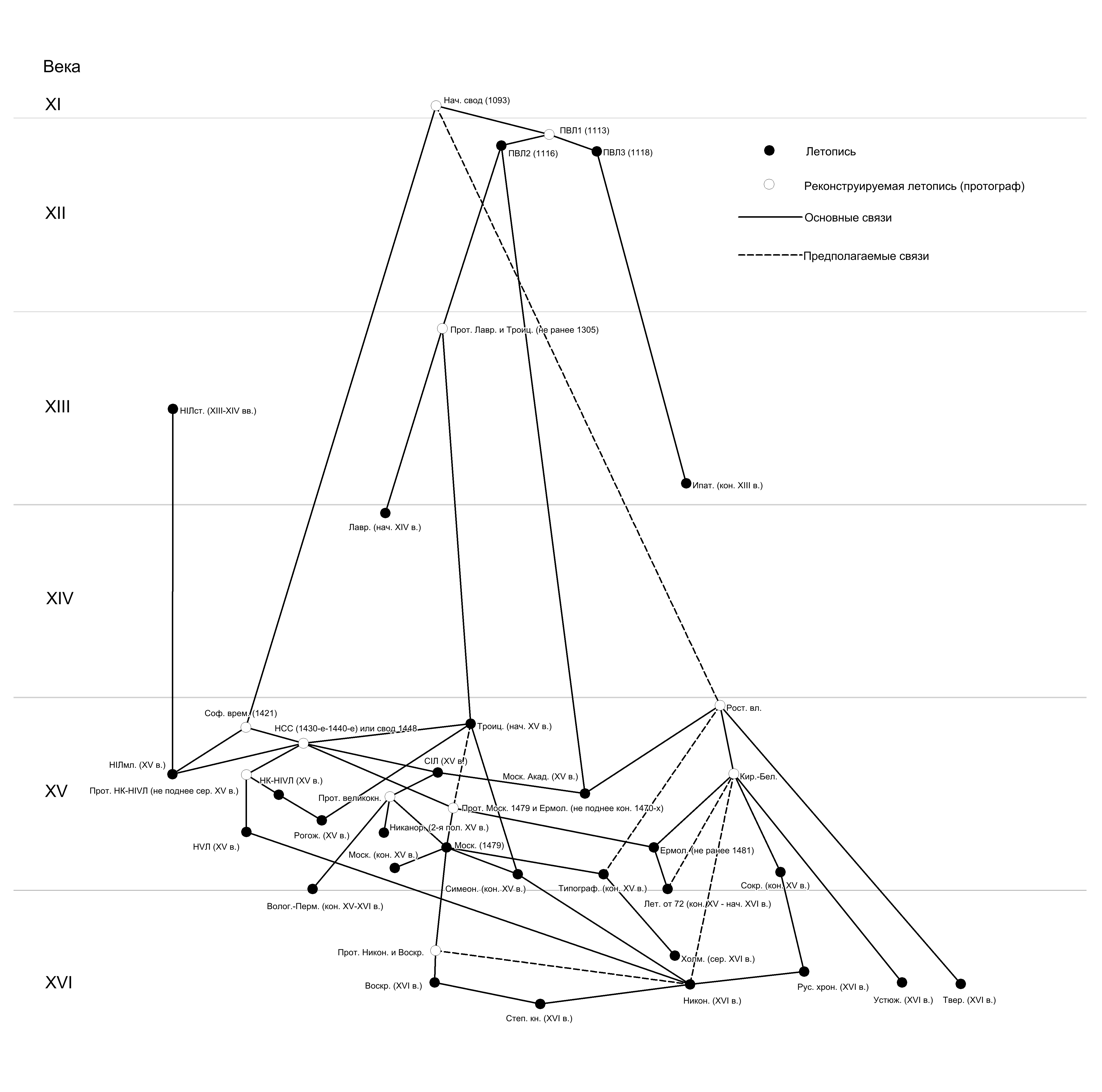
Chronological graph of the major Rus' chronicles

The early-12th-century Primary Chronicle, describing the early history of Kievan Rus', is the oldest surviving Rus' chronicle. Aleksey Shakhmatov noted that a number of entries about 11th-century Novgorod are present in the 15th-century Novgorod First Chronicle but absent from the Primary Chronicle. This led Shakhmatov to theorize that the beginning of the Novgorod First Chronicle includes text older than that in the Primary Chronicle. He called it the "Primary Svod", and dated it to the end of the 11th century as a basis for the Primary Chronicle. If two or more chronicles coincide up to a particular year, one chronicle is copied from another (rare) or they had a common source. Shakhmatov developed a timeline of the old Rus' chronicles, connecting most of them and demonstrating that the extant 14th-to-17th-century chronicles date back to the Primary Svod, earlier, hypothetical 11th-century and late-10th-century historical records. His method and theories became a mainstay of Rus' chronicle studies.

== Textual criticism ==
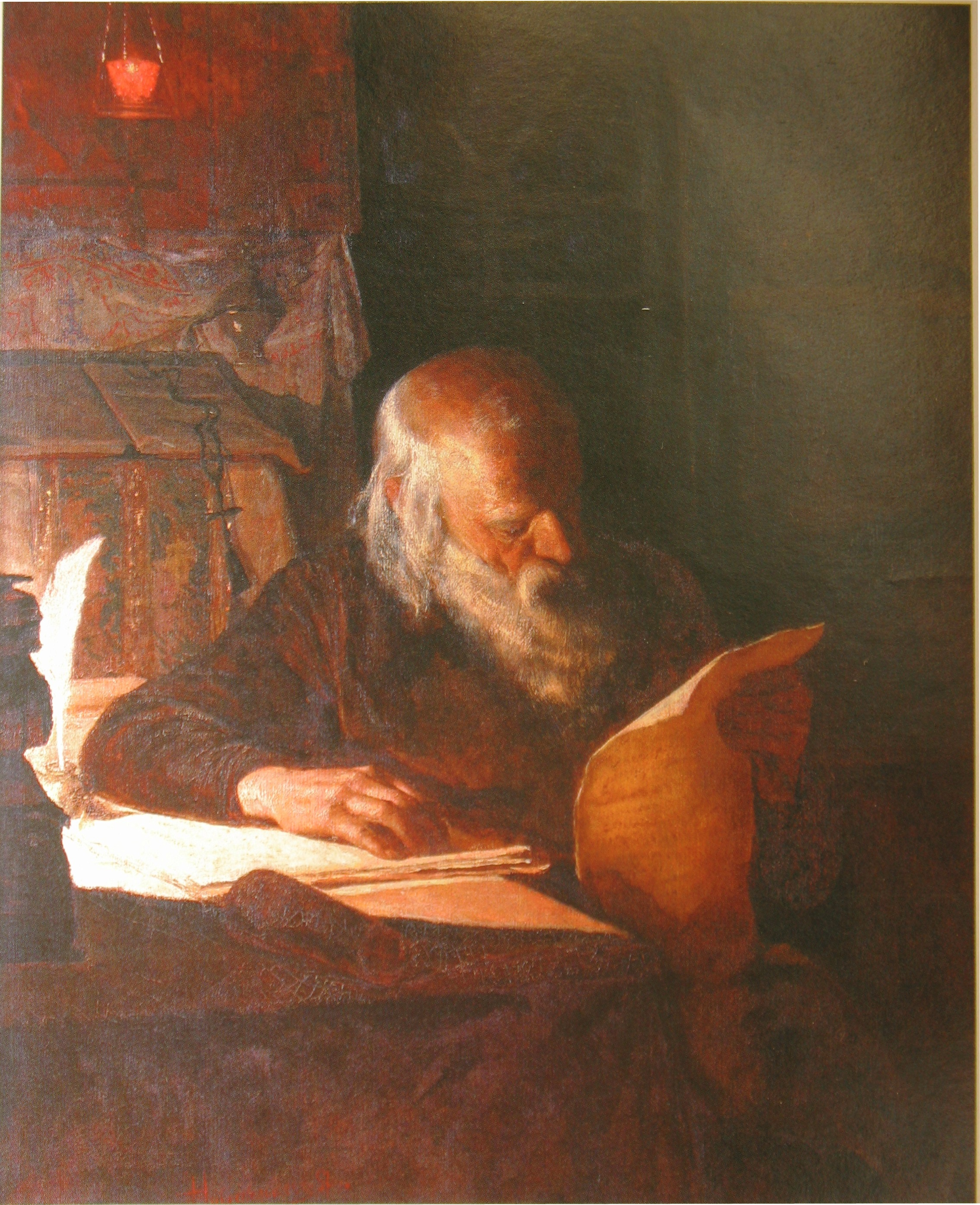
The Chronicle (1887) by Alexander N. Novoskoltsev

An estimated 5,000 svods exist. Most have not been preserved as originals; only copies and partial revisions created between the 13th and 19th centuries, including the oldest 11th- and 12th-century chronicles, are known.

Many of the oldest chronicles have not survived. Each principality had a court chronicler to describe its history and defend its views. During the 15th century, chronicles such as the Pskov Letopises and western Russian chronicles were hostile to the Principality of Moscow. The travel story A Journey Beyond the Three Seas was incorporated into the 16th-century Lvov Chronicle and the Sofia Second Chronicle.

== Influence on dream visions ==
Illustration from Christian Topography (Uvarov edition) captioned, "The world on the other side of the door"

Nikolai Prokofiev and Rosalia Shor noted an occasional dream-vision motif in old Russian chronicles. In her article, "The Genre of Visions in Ancient Russian Literature", Alla Soboleva notes the chronicles' unusual worldview. An illustration c. 1495 in the Slavic manuscript of Cosmas Indicopleustes' sixth-century Christian Topography depicts the sun going underground at sunset and, according to Yegor Redin, was incorporated into the Old Russian chronicles.

Historian Igor Froyanov cites a scene in the Novgorod First Chronicle and the Primary Chronicle where volkhvs (wizards) talk about the creation of humanity:

Yan Vyshatich asked, "How do you think man came to be?" The volkhvs answered, "God bathed in the bath and sweated, wiped himself with a rag and threw it from heaven to the earth; and the devil created man, and God put his soul into him. Therefore, when a person dies, the body goes to the earth, and the soul goes to God".

Two wizards reportedly appeared in Novgorod in 1071 and began to sow unrest, saying that the Dnieper would soon flow backwards and the land would move. Most chronicles have digressions which predict the future, describe strange phenomena, and discuss their meaning from a mystical point of view.

== Historiography ==
Most scholars view the chronicles as historical sources as well as works of art. Vasily Klyuchevsky used them as a historical source along with the lives of the saints.

=== Early period ===
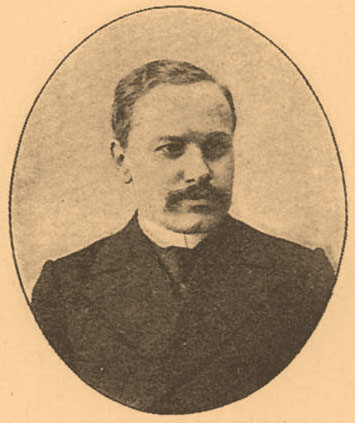
Alexey Shakhmatov, classifier of the chronicles

Study of the history of Old Russian chronicles was begun by Vasily Tatishchev and Mikhail Shcherbatov, whose work impacted the emergence of source criticism as a science. Using Tatishchev and Stroev's method, Mikhail Pogodin discovered how the chronicles were constructed. Mikhail Sukhomlinov's 1856 On the Ancient Russian Chronicle as a Literary Monument attempted to establish the literary sources of the initial chronicle. Bestuzhev-Ryumin's 1868 On the Composition of Russian Chronicles Until the End of the 14th Century deconstructed chronicle text into annual records and legends.

A new stage in the study of Russian chronicles was begun by Alexey Shakhmatov (1864-1920). His comparative textual method compared lists and analyzed text. Shakhmatov sought to learn about the circumstances of the creation of each chronicle through chronology, printing and language errors, and dialectic.

=== Modern period ===
Starting with Shakhmatov, the main analysis of the text of the chronicles recognizes the comparison of two or more chronicles throughout their length, and not fragmentary observations. The method of Shakhmatov was developed by Mikhail Priselkov, who placed more emphasis on the historical aspect ("History of Russian Chronicles of the XI—XV centuries", 1940).

Shakhmatov's genealogy was developed and revised by his followers, among whom the greatest contribution to the study of Russian chronicles was made by Nikolai Lavrov, Arseny Nasonov, Lev Cherepnin, Dmitry Likhachev, Sergey Bakhrushin, Alexander Andreev, Mikhail Tikhomirov, Nikolai Nikolsky, Vasily Istrin, etc. Shakhmatov's methodology formed the basis of modern textology.

The study of letopis texts has become widespread in modern Russia and other countries. Among the researchers of the second half of the XX century, the greatest contribution to the study of old Russian letopises was made by I. A. Tikhomirov, D. S. Likhachev, Ya. S. Lurie, V. I. Koretsky, V. I. Buganov, etc.

The study and publication of the Belarusian-Lithuanian letopises were carried out by scientists from Poland (I. Danilovich, S. Smolka, A. Prohaska, S. Ptashitsky, Ya. Yakubovsky, E. Okhmansky), Russia (I. A. Tikhomirov, A. A. Shakhmatov, M. D. Priselkov, V. T. Pashuto, B. N. Florya), Ukraine (M. S. Grushevsky, F. Sushitsky), Belarus (V. A. Chemeritsky, N. N. Ulashchik), Lithuania (M. Yuchas, R. Yasas).

== List of chronicles ==
=== High Medieval chronicles (1000–1300) ===
- Academic Chronicle (Moscow Academic Chronicle; continues the Radziwiłł Chronicle from 1206 up to the year 1418/9, with the text covering 1207–1237 being identical to that found in the Sofia First Chronicle; the unique content is the Rostov collection (1238 – 1418))
- Galician–Volhynian Chronicle (continuation of the Kievan Chronicle, covering the years 1200–1292, written in the late 13th century.)
- Kievan Chronicle (Kiev/Kyiv/Kyivan Chronicle, "KC"; commissioned by Rurik Rostislavich as a continuation of the Primary Chronicle)
- Novgorod First Chronicle (NPL; one of the oldest and most important Rus' chronicles, contains information older than the Primary Chronicle, and sometimes differs from it)
- Primary Chronicle (PVL, Tale of Bygone Years; covering the years 852–1110s. One of the oldest and most important Rus' chronicles, found in many manuscripts and codices including the Laurentian Codex, Hypatian Codex, Königsberg Manuscript (of the Radziwiłł Chronicle), and others)
- Radziwiłł Chronicle (continuation of the Primary Chronicle up to the year 1206)
- Suzdalian Chronicle (12th–14th century; preserved in Lav., Rad., Aka, and LPS)

=== Late Medieval chronicles (1300–1500) ===
==== Lithuanian Chronicles ====
The (Belarusian-)Lithuanian Chronicles are a 14th–16th-century grouping of chronicles written in the Ruthenian language for the purpose of Lithuanian patriotism.

First redaction:

- Origo regis Jagyelo et Wytholdi ducum Lithuanie in Latin translation
- Chronicle of Avraamka or Vilnius Manuscript; last section known as the Chronicle of Vilnius
- Slutsk Chronicle
- Supraśl Manuscript, including
  - the Supraśl Chronicle, and
  - the Volyn Short Chronicle, also known as Short Kyivan Chronicle (c. 1500, covering the years 852–1500)
- Academic Manuscript
- Nikifor Manuscript

Second redaction:

- Chronicle of the Grand Duchy of Lithuania, Ruthenia and Samogitia (1520s)

Third redaction:

- Bychowiec Chronicle (Bykhovets Chronicle), between 1519 and 1542

==== Late Medieval Novgorodian chronicles ====
- Lvov Chronicle ("LL"; 16th century), not to be confused with the 17th-century Lviv Chronicle
- Novgorod Fourth Chronicle ("N4"; 15th century; hypothetical source: Novgorodsko-Sofiysky Svod)
- Novgorod Second Chronicle ("N2"; 16th century)
- Pskov Chronicles (15th–17th century): First, Second and Third.
- Sofia First Chronicle ("S1"; last quarter of the 15th century; covering the years 852–1418, with sporadic additions up to 1471. Hypothetical source: Novgorodsko-Sofiysky Svod)
- Sofia Second Chronicle (16th century)

==== Late Medieval Suzdalian chronicles ====
- Chronicler of Pereyaslavl-Suzdal (LPS; c. 1470)
- Nikon Chronicle (mid-16th-century compilation)
- Rogozh Chronicle (c. 1450)
- Simeon Chronicle ("Sim."; written c. 1490s, earliest extant manuscript 16th century)
- Trinity Chronicle ("TL"; early 15th century)
- Yermolin Chronicle (compilation, c. 1490)

=== Ruthenian and Ukrainian Cossack chronicles (1500–1800) ===
- Chernihiv Chronicle, chronicle of Northern Ukraine from 1497 to 1764
- Chroniclers of Volyn and Ukraine, compilation of 12 chronicles on Volhynia (Volyn) and Ukraine from the early 17th century
- Eyewitness Chronicle, chronicle of Central Ukraine from 1648 to 1702
- Hrabianka Chronicle, chronicle of Central Ukraine from around 1648 to 1709
- Huklyv Chronicle, chronicle of Transcarpathia in southwestern Ukraine from 1660 to 1812
- Hustyn Chronicle, 17th-century chronicle from Left-bank Ukraine (mostly Volhynia and Podolia) based on earlier Rus' chronicles, extending to 1598
- Lviv Chronicle, chronicle of Western Ukraine from 1498 to 1649
- Ostroh Chronicler, chronicle of Northwestern Ukraine from 1500 to 1636
- Samijlo Velychko Chronicle, chronicle of Central Ukraine from 1620 to 1700

=== Muscovite and Russian chronicles (1500–1800) ===
- Ioachim Chronicle (17th-century compilation); authenticity disputed, part of Tatishchev information.
- Illustrated Chronicle of Ivan the Terrible or Tsar Book (c. 1570)
- Kazan Chronicle or Kazan History (written c. 1560–1565, first printed in 1790)
- Kholmogordskaya Chronicle (mid-16th century)
- Tver Chronicle ("Tver"; 16th century, includes material from c. 1400)
- Typographic Chronicle (c. 1500)
- Vladimir Chronicler (Vladimirskiy letopisets; "Vlad."; 16th century)

==== Siberian Chronicles ====
The Siberian Chronicles were written from the end of the 16th century to the 18th century:

- Remezov Chronicle, including the Kungur Chronicle
- Stroganov Chronicle
- Yesipov Chronicle

== See also ==
- Kormchaia Book
- Merilo Pravednoye
- De moribus tartarorum, lituanorum et moscorum
- Freising manuscripts
- The legend of Sloven and Rus' and the city of Slovensk, a 17th-century Muscovite chronicle legend

== Bibliography ==
- Dimnik, Martin (January 2004). "The Title "Grand Prince" in Kievan Rus'". Mediaeval Studies. 66: 253–312. doi:10.1484/J.MS.2.306512.
- Halperin, Charles J. (2001). "Text and Textology: Salmina's Dating of the Chronicle Tales about Dmitrii Donskoi". Slavonic and East European Review. 79 (2): 248–263. doi:10.1353/see.2001.0046.
- Likhachov, Dimitry Русские летописи и их культурно-историческое значение. — М.; Л., 1947.
- Nasonov Насонов А.Н. История русского летописания XI — начала XVIII века. — М., 1969
- Ostrowski, Donald (2018). "Was There a Riurikid Dynasty in Early Rus'?". Canadian-American Slavic Studies. 52 (1): 30–49. doi:10.1163/22102396-05201009.
- Plokhy, Serhii (2006). The Origins of the Slavic Nations: Premodern Identities in Russia, Ukraine, and Belarus. New York: Cambridge University Press. p. 378. ISBN 978-0-521-86403-9.
- Sysyn, Frank E. (1990). "The Cossack Chronicles and the Development of Modern Ukrainian Culture and National Identity". Harvard Ukrainian Studies. 14 (3/4). Harvard Ukrainian Research Institute: 593–607. ISSN 0363-5570. JSTOR 41036403.
- Priselkov Приселков М.Д. История русского летописания XI—XV вв. — Л., 1940.
- Priselkov Приселков М.Д. Троицкая летопись: Реконструкция текста. – 2-е изд. – СПб.: Наука, 2002. – 512, [2] с.
- Aleksey Shakhmatov. Investigation on the Oldest Rus' Chronicle Svods. — Saint Petersburg: Printing-House of M.A. Aleksandrov, 1908. — XX, 686 p. — Reprint from Chronicle of Work of Imperial Archaeographic Commission. — Vol. 20. (Russian: Шахматов А.А. Разыскания о древнейших русских летописных сводах. – СПб.: Типография М.А. Александрова, 1908. — XX, 686 с. — Оттиск из кн.: Летописи занятий Императорской Археографической Комиссии. — Т. 20).
- Aleksey Shakhmatov. Review of Rus' Chronicle Svods of 14th—16th Century. Moscow / ed. by A.S. Orlov, Boris Grekov; Academy of Sciences of USSR, Institute of Literature. — Moscow, Leningrad: Publisher of Academy of Sciences of USSR, 1938. — 372 p. (Russian: Шахматов А.А. Обозрение русских летописных сводов XIV—XVI вв. / отв. ред.: А.С. Орлов, акад. Б.Д. Греков; АН СССР, Институт литературы. – М.; Л.: Издательство АН СССР, 1938. — 372 с.).
- Suhomlinov Сухомлинов М.И. О древней русской летописи как памятнике литературном. — СПб., 1856.
- Дмитриева Р.П. Библиография русского летописания. — М.; Л., 1962
- Творогов О.В. Сюжетное повествование в летописях XI—XIII вв. / Истоки русской беллетристики: Возникновение сюжетного повествования в древнерусской литературы. — Л.: Наука, 1970. — С. 31—66.
- Лурье Я.С. К изучению летописного жанра // Труды Отдела древнерусской литературы. — 1972. — Т. 27. — С. 76—93.
- Лурье Я.С. Общерусские летописи XIV—XV вв. — Л., 1976.
- Корецкий В.И. История русского летописания второй половины XVI — начала XVII века. — М., 1986.
- Словарь книжников и книжности Древней Руси / АН СССР. ИРЛИ; Отв. ред. Д.С. Лихачев. — Л.: Наука, 1987. — Вып. 1 (XI – первая половина XIV в.). — С. 234—251; Л.: Наука, 1989. — Вып. 2, ч. 2. — С. 17—18, 20—69.
- Лурье Я.С. Две истории Руси XV века. — СПб., 1994.
- Literature of Old Rusʹ. Biographical and Bibliographical Dictionary / ed. by Oleg Tvorogov. - Moscow: Prosvescheniye ("Enlightenment"), 1996. (Russian: Лурье Я.С. Летописи // Литература Древней Руси. Биобиблиографический словарь / под ред. О.В. Творогова. - М.: Просвещение, 1996).
- Бобров А.Г. Новгородские летописи XV века. — СПб.: Дмитрий Буланин, 2000. — 287 с.
- Гиппиус А.А. К истории сложения текста Новгородской первой летописи // Новгородский исторический сборник. — СПб., 1997. — Вып. 6 (16) / Рос. акад. наук, Институт рос. истории, С.-Петербургский филиал; отв. ред. В.Л. Янин. — C. 3–72.
- Гиппиус А.А. К характеристике новгородского владычного летописания XII–XIV вв. // Великий Новгород в истории средневековой Европы: К 70-летию В.Л. Янина. — М.: Русские словари, 1999. — С. 345–364.
- Гимон Т.В. События XI – начала XII в. в новгородских летописях и перечнях // Древнейшие государства Восточной Европы: 2010 год: Предпосылки и пути образования Древнерусского государства / отв. ред. серии Е.А. Мельникова. Институт всеобщей истории РАН. — М.: Рус. Фонд Содействия Образ. и Науке, 2012. — С. 584–706.
- Сергеев В.И. Сибирские летописи // Жуков Е.М. Советская историческая энциклопедия: В 16 т. - М.: Государственное научное издательство «Советская энциклопедия», 1961-1976.
- Alexander Zamaleev [in Russian] (2005). History of Russian culture (in Russian). St. Petersburg: Official Publishing House of St. Petersburg University. p. 256. ISBN 5-288-03632-2.
- D.S.Likhachov; N. Ponyrko (1986). Izbornik: The Stories Of Ancient Rus (in Russian). Moscow: Художественная литература. p. 410. ISBN 3-515-07560-7.
- Himon, Timothy (1998). What was written in the Russian Letopises? № 1 (2) (in Russian). Moscow: «ФИПП». pp. 8–16.
- Mikhail Tikhomirov (1978). Letopis // Great Soviet Encyclopedia. Moscow: Soviet Encyclopedia.
- Aleksey Shakhmatov (1938). Review of Russian letopising svods of the XIV-XVI centuries. Moscow: АН СССР.
- Katchanovski, Ivan; Kohut, Zenon E.; Nesebio, Bohdan Y.; Yurkevich, Myroslav (2013). "Chronicles". Historical Dictionary of Ukraine. Lanham, Maryland; Toronto; Plymouth: Scarecrow Press. pp. 75–76. ISBN 9780810878471.
- Likhachov, Dmitry S. (1947). Russian letopises and their cultural and historical significance (in Russian). Moscow: АН СССР. p. 410.
- Timberlake, Alan (2000). "Who Wrote the Laurentian Chronicle (1177–1203)?". Zeitschrift für Slavische Philologie. 59 (2). Universitätsverlag WINTER: 237–265. JSTOR 24003133.

== Selected editions ==
- Complete Collection of Russian Chronicles: Russian: Полное собрание русских летописей. — СПб.; М, 1843; М., 1989. — Т. 1—38.
- Новгородская первая летопись старшего и младшего изводов. — М.; Л., 1950.
- Псковские летописи.— М.; Л., 1941—1955. — Вып. 1—2.
- Рассказы русских летописей XII—XIV вв. / Перевод и пояснения Т.Н. Михельсон. — М., 1968; 2-е изд. — М., 1973.
- Рассказы русских летописей XV—XVII вв. / Перевод и пояснения Т.Н. Михельсон — М., 1976,
- Севернорусский летописный свод 1472 года / Подг. текста и комм Я.С. Лурье; Перевод В.В. Колесова // Памятники литературы Древней Руси: Вторая половина XV века. — М., 1982. — С. 410—443, 638—655.
- The Russian Primary Chronicle, Laurentian Text. Translated and edited by Samuel Hazzard Cross and Olgerd P. Sherbowitz-Wetzor. Cambridge, MA: The Mediaeval Academy of America, 1953.
- Excerpts of Primary Chronicle, including founding of Novgorod by Rus', Attacks on Byzantines, and Conversion of Vladimir. Also mentions several Slavic tribes by name.
- A collation of Primary Chronicle by Donald Ostrowski in Cyrillic is available at https://web.archive.org/web/20050309022812/http://hudce7.harvard.edu/~ostrowski/pvl/ together with an erudite and lengthy introduction in English. This is an interlinear collation including the five main manuscript witnesses, as well as a new paradosis, or reconstruction of the original.
- The Chronicle of Novgorod 1016-1471. Intr. C. Raymond Beazley, A. A. Shakhmatov (London, 1914).
- Savignac, David (trans). The Pskov 3rd Chronicle.
