= Lvov Chronicle (16th century) =

16th-century Rus' chronicle

- Author(s): unknown
- Language: Church Slavonic
- Date: c. 1533
- Manuscript(s): 2 main textual witnesses: 1792 N.A. Lvov publication; Etter Manuscript
- Genre: Rus' chronicle
- Period covered: until 1533

The Lvov Chronicle (Russian: Львовская летопись, romanized: L'vovskaya letopis') is a Rus' chronicle from the 16th century, containing annalistic entries until the year 1533. It is named after its discoverer, Nikolay Lvov (1753–1803).

== Contents ==
Lvov Chronicle as published in Volume 20 of the Complete Collection of Russian Chronicles (1910)

The text is full of typos, misspellings, and errors in chronology and history.

- The beginning of the Lvov Chronicle is lost. The opening section is devoted to genealogy and regnal lists. The surviving text starts with what appears to be a Byzantine imperial genealogy, mentioning the names of Palaiologos family members. Then it states 'In the year 6663 [1155], the first to come from the Varangians was Riurikŭ and his two brothers, Seneus and Tuvor. Riurikŭ's son was Igor'.' By contrast, the Primary Chronicle dates the calling of the Varangians to Anno Mundi 6360 (862 in the Gregorian calendar). A biblical regnal list follows, misdating the birth of Jesus to 5500 (284), then a regnal list of Roman and Byzantine emperors until Constantine VII. Then a confused genealogy of Rus' princes starts with Riurikŭ. Finally, there is a regnal list of khans of the Golden Horde beginning with Baty.
- The narrative part of the Lvov Chronicle commences with an interpretation of the Four kingdoms of Daniel, and then relates a mixture of biblical, Greek, Roman and Byzantine history. The author identifies Rus' as an area in the part of the world given to Noah's Japheth after the Flood, and recounts the tradition that Andrew the Apostle visited ancient Kyiv. From there, the Lvov Chronicle presents a similar narrative to the Ermolin Chronicle until the late 14th century.
- From the late 14th century to 1518, the text is similar to the Sofia Second Chronicle. The chronicle continues until 1533.
- Then in a number of manuscripts reads Chronicler of the Beginning of the Kingdom.
- The Lvov Chronicle contains, among other things, A Journey Beyond the Three Seas by Afanasy Nikitin. This is one of the sections omitted in the 1792 Lvov editio princeps.
- A letter allegedly written by Ivan the Terrible, which is similar to the text found in the Nikon Chronicle.

== Textual criticism ==
The chronicle was first published in Saint Petersburg in 1792 by Nikolay Aleksandrovich Lvov, from whom it takes its name, with a number of omissions. He gave it the title Chronicler of Rus' from the accession of Rurik to the death of Tsar John Vasilyevich (Russian: Лѣтописецъ Руской отъ пришествія Рурика до кончины Царя Іоанна Васильевича; the latter is better known as Ivan the Terrible). Lvov based himself on a manuscript from the Monastery of Saint Euthymius in Suzdal, which was subsequently lost. In 1903, Alexander Presnyakov found Karl Etter's manuscript of the chronicle, which then formed the basis for the 1910–1914 edition of the Lvov Chronicle in the Complete Collection of Russian Chronicles, prepared by Sergey Aleksandrovich Adrianov.

Aleksey Shakhmatov (1892) noted the similarities of the text of the Lvov Chronicle and the Sofia Second Chronicle in entries from the late 14th century until the year 1518. In his opinion, the basis for both chronicles was the 1518 codex. Arseniy Nikolaevich Nasonov (1930) suggested that the source of this code was the code of opposition to Ivan III of the 1480s.

Iakov S. Lur'e (1989) pointed out the closeness of the Lvov Chronicle to the Archival manuscript of the Sofia Second Chronicle, up to the repetition of the defects of this copy. At the same time, there are primary readings in a number of places in the Lvov Chronicle. Thus, the latter has preserved some information, presumably dating back to the 1480s and lost in the Sofia Second Chronicle: information about the murder of Dmitry Shemyaka, carried out at the behest of Vasily II the Dark; the full text of the story of the Muscovite defeat of Novgorod in 1471 and others. According to Lur'e, the source of the Lvov Chronicle was the 1518 corpus: the direct original of the Archival copy of the Sofia Second Chronicle. The first part of the Lvov Chronicle has no direct correspondence with the Sofia Second Chronicle. This part is close to the text of the Ermolin Chronicle, coinciding with it in all the differences that the latter has here in relation to its source: a special processing of the hypothetical Novgorodsko-Sofiysky Svod, reflected also in the 1479 Grand Princely Codex of Moscow. The Lvov Chronicle also reflects a text close to the Radziwiłł Chronicle.

== Editions ==
- Летописец русской от пришествия Рурика до кончины царя Иоанна Васильевича (Chronicler of Rus' from the accession of Rurik to the death of Tsar John Vasilyevich). Nikolay Lvov. Saint Petersburg, 1792. Parts 1–5.
- Complete Collection of Russian Chronicles. Volume 20. Lvov Chronicle (according to the Etter Manuscript).
  - Volume 20. Lvov Chronicle. Part 1. Edited by Sergey Alexandrovich Adrianov. Saint Petersburg: Typography M.A. Aleksandrov, 1910. 418 pages.
  - Volume 20. Lvov Chronicle. Part 2. Edited by Sergey Alexandrovich Adrianov. Saint Petersburg: Typography M.A. Aleksandrov, 1914. Pages 420–686.
  - Volume 20. Lvov Chronicle. Мoscow, 2004. 704 pages.
- Lvov Chronicle. Ryazan: Uzorochie, 1999.
  - Part 1. 720 p.
  - Part 2. 648 p. (Series ‘Rus' Chronicles’, vol. 4, 5).

== Literature ==
- Shakhmatov, Aleksey, Ермолинская летопись и Ростовский владычный свод (The Ermolin Chronicle and Rostov Vladychny Codex) (1904), pp. 26–48. Saint Petersburg.
- Extract from the minutes of the meeting of the Archaeographic Commission. Annals of the activities of the Archaeographical Commission. Volume 26 (1914), pp. 54–55. Saint Petersburg.
- Nasonov, Arseniy Nikolaevich, Летописные памятники Тверского княжества (Chronicle Monuments of the Tverian Principality) (1930), pp. 714–721. Izvestiia AN SSSR. VII series, no. 9. Leningrad.
- Likhachev, Dmitry, Русские летописи и их культурно-историческое значение (Russian Chronicles and Their Cultural Significance) (1947), pp. 474–475. Moscow; Leningrad.
- Lur'e, Iakov, Kholmogorsky Chronicle. Proceedings of the Department of Old Rus' Literature. Volume 25. (1970), pp. 140–141. Moscow; Leningrad.
- Lur'e, Iakov, All-Rus' Chronicles of the 14th–15th Centuries (1976), pp. 210–213, 223–240. Leningrad.
