= Pskov Chronicles =

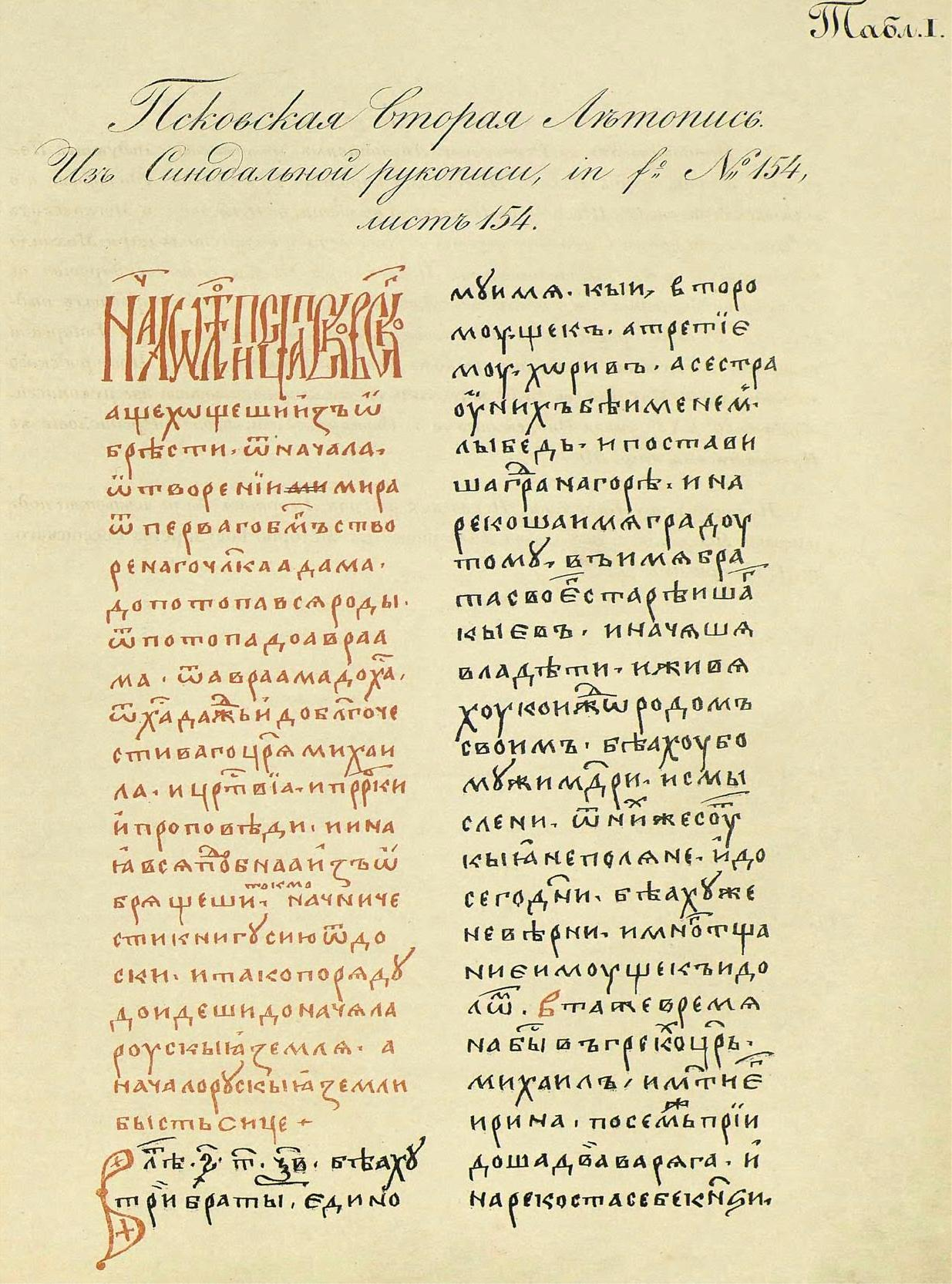
Pskov Chronicles fragment edited by Nasonov in the PSRL (1955).

The Pskov Chronicles (Note: Belarusian: Пскоўскія летапісы, romanized: Pskoŭskiya letapisy. Russian: Псковские летописи, romanized: Pskovskie letopisi. Ukrainian: Літописи псковські, romanized: Litopysy pskovs'ki.) are a set of three Rus' chronicles of the late Middle Ages concerning the Pskov Land and the Pskov Republic that have survived in several manuscripts. They are simply known as the First, Second, and Third Pskov Chronicle, or the Pskov First, Second, and Third Chronicle. At the earliest, the Pskovian chronicle writing tradition emerged in the 13th century, but more likely in the 14th century, as the city of Pskov (Pleskov) was gradually establishing its autonomy and eventual independence from the Novgorod Republic.

== Manuscripts ==
=== First Chronicle ===
The First Pskov Chronicle (or Pskov First Chronicle) is known from several manuscripts:

- the Tykhanovsky manuscript, dating from the first half of the 17th century, the text of which is dated to 1469;
- the First Archival manuscript (Arkhivskiy I), dating from the late 16th century, the text of which is dated to 1481;
- a group of at least 14 manuscripts (including the Pohodynskyi and Obolenskyi manuscripts) from the 16th to 18th centuries, all of which seem to derive from a compilation or redaction produced in the year 1547.

The oldest textual witness, the Tykhanovsky manuscript, opens with the Tale of Dovmont/Daumantas, concerning the legendary prince Daumantas of Pskov, during whose reign the city of Pskov achieved some level of autonomy. The Tale is followed by a short chronological introduction, after which the presentation of East Slavic and Pskovian history begins. The collection ends with a story about the events of 1464–1469, connected with the struggle of Pskov for an independent eparchy (diocese). The other three manuscripts expanded the text with stories of the Pskovians' relationships with the Novgorodians and the Muscovites. The manuscripts of the 1547 compilation show a heavy pro-Muscovite influence, emphasising Moscow's superiority and authority, particularly in the Tale of Pskov's Capture under the year 1510. The text bears a very close resemblance to the Novgorod Fifth Chronicle until the year 1447, after which the text closely follows the First Archival manuscript dated to 1481.

=== Second Chronicle ===
The Second Pskov Chronicle (or Pskov Second Chronicle) has only survived in one manuscript, the Synodal Scroll (Sinodalnyy spisok), dated to the late 15th century (1486 according to Nasonov). It does not say much about the veche and the conflicts with Novgorod, but does say a lot about wars, epidemics and revolts against the Pskovian governors appointed by the prince of Moscow in 1483–1486. Scholars have characterised the tone of this compilation as generally pro-Moscow.

=== Third Chronicle ===
The Third Pskov Chronicle (or Pskov Third Chronicle) was originally compiled in 1567, with some scholars believing the Stroyevskiy manuscript to be the autograph. Several manuscripts with continuations up to the second half of the 17th century have survived, including the Second Archival manuscript or Arkhivskiy II, closely following the Stroyevskiy manuscript with minor changes, and providing a continuation from 1568 to 1650. Nasonov characterised the Tendenz of this third chronicle of Pskov as hostile towards Muscovy, regarding the 1510 capture of Pskov as a betrayal. The author condemns the Muscovite princes Vasily III and Ivan IV "the Terrible" because of their marriages. Some later researchers have questioned whether the entire Pskov Third Chronicle is anti-Moscow instead of several sections that are evidently so, but the chronicle's anti-Novgorodian stance is more apparent.

== Contents ==
The earliest portions of the Pskov Chronicles heavily borrowed from Novgorodian chronicles such as the Novgorod First Chronicle, and the Primary Chronicle compiled in Kiev (modern Kyiv); the chroniclers of Pskov copied those parts that seemed significant for local Pskovian history, and left most other materials out. The compiler of the Pskov Third Chronicle commented sub anno 862: 'There is no mention made in the chronicle about the town of Pskov (Pleskov), nor by whom it was founded; all that we know is that it already existed at the time that the princes Rurik and his brothers came from the Varangians to the Slovenes to rule. It is also mentioned that Igor Rurikovich's wife Olga came from Pskov.'

The Pskov Chronicles (particularly the Third) provide an account of the Mongol Siege of Kiev (1240) – written in the late 1460s or early 1470s; over two centuries after the fact – according to which the Mongol siege engines took ten weeks to break through Kiev's two sets of fortifications. The Pskov Chronicles' account of Kiev's capture was later adapted into Avraamka's Chronicle from Western Rus' and the Bolshakov Chronicle from Novgorod. The date of Kiev's fall, provided as 19 November 1240 by the Pskovian chronicles, used to be accepted by several earlier historians, but scholar Alexander V. Maiorov (2016) concluded that this version of events 'is entirely fictitious', made up in order 'to reconstruct the history of the struggle against the Tatars at a time when the Golden Horde had lost its political importance.'

== Linguistics ==
The earliest segments of the Pskov Chronicles were written in Old East Slavic, reflecting their adaptation from older Novgorodian and Kievan chronicles, although quotations from Christian scriptures and religious writings more closely resemble Church Slavonic. The original writings on the local history of Pskov, from the 13th to late 15th centuries, often show elements of the regional Pskovian dialect (closely related to the Old Novgorod dialect). The later continuations, especially those of the Pskov Third Chronicle ending in the mid-17th century, feature characteristics typical of early modern Russian (Muscovite).

== Bibliography ==
=== Critical editions ===
- Editio princeps: 1837 (all three Pskov Chronicles).
- Collation of the First and Third Chronicle: 1848.
- Collation of the Second Chronicle: 1851.
- Nasonov, A. N. (1955). Полное собрание русских летописей. Том 5. Выпуск 2. Псковские летописи [Complete Collection of Rus' Chronicles. Volume 5. Issue 2. Pskov Chronicles] (in Russian). Moscow, Leningrad: USSR Academy of Sciences Publishing House. p. 365. ISBN 978-5-457-50387-8. (Nasonov published his first edition of the First Chronicle in 1941).

=== Translations ===
- Savignac, David (2016). The Pskov 3rd Chronicle. 2nd Edition. Edited, translated, and annotated by David Savignac. Crofton: Beowulf & Sons. p. 245.. Translation based on the 2000 reprint of Nasonov's 1955 critical edition.

=== Literature ===
- Grabmuller, H.-J. (1975), Die Pskover Chroniken: Untersuchungen zur Russischen Regionalchronistik im 13—15. Jahrhundert (in German). Wiesbaden.
- Halperin, Charles J. (2022). The Rise and Demise of the Myth of the Rus' Land (PDF). Leeds: Arc Humanities Press. p. 107. ISBN 9781802700565.
- Maiorov, Alexander V. (2016). "The Mongolian Capture of Kiev: The Two Dates". The Slavonic and East European Review. 94 (4): 702–714. doi:10.5699/slaveasteurorev2.94.4.0702. JSTOR 10.5699/slaveasteurorev2.94.4.0702.
- Martin, Janet (2007). Medieval Russia: 980–1584. Second Edition. E-book. Cambridge: Cambridge University Press. ISBN 978-0-511-36800-4.
