= Trinity Chronicle =

15th-century Rus' chronicle

The Trinity Chronicle (Russian: Троицкая летопись, romanized: Troitskaya letopis', abbreviated TL, Tro, or T) is a Rus' chronicle written in Church Slavonic, probably at the Trinity Lavra near Moscow by Epiphanius the Wise (died 1420).

== Manuscript ==
The manuscript of the Trinity Chronicle may or may not have contained a 'Short Redaction' of the Kulikovo Chronicle Tale. The Chronicle ended with Edigu's invasion of 1408. Its tendenz has been tentatively described as pro-Muscovite and pro-Cyprian. The text appears to have been an early 15th-century copy of a text that was close to the Laurentian Codex of 1377. The Trinity Chronicle was often cited by 18th-century historians.

The only known manuscript was lost in the fire of Moscow in 1812.

== Priselkov reconstruction ==
After its destruction in 1812, the text was partially reconstructed by Mikhail D. Priselkov (posthumously published in 1950) from quotations in Nikolay Karamzin's History of the Russian State (1816–1826) and in the 1804 critical edition of the Laurentian Codex by Chebotarev and Cherepanov, which only reached the year 906. The published reconstruction, however, contains much speculative borrowing from other chronicles and is not entirely reliable. Especially Aleksey Shakhmatov's assumption that 'the Simeon Chronicle was identical to the Trinity Chronicle through 1390' turned out to be a great flaw in Priselkov's efforts, as was the assumption that it had to have been similar to the Rogozh Chronicle in other places. Priselkov acknowledged as much himself by indicating his 'reconstruction' was not really a 'restoration', but an 'approximation'; the material with a higher degree of 'probability' was printed in a larger font size, and less reliable readings called 'conjectured segments' in a smaller font.

== Value for historical and textual criticism ==
"[T]extual comparisons of reconstructed non-texts [the Trinity Chronicle] with hypothetical non-texts [the Compilation of 1448] in order to determine textual primacy cannot be definitive. (...) Inventing new hypothetical compilations or redating old hypothetical compilations is fun, but not terribly productive."

— Charles J. Halperin (2001)

The reconstructed text of the Trinity Chronicle is considered by some scholars to be one of the six main copies that are of greatest importance for textual criticism of the Primary Chronicle (PVL), 'which aims to reconstruct the original [text] by comparing extant witnesses.' Because the original is lost and its text can only be indirectly reconstructed, as Priselkov attempted in 1950, it is considered the least reliable of the six main witnesses, and is sometimes excluded (reducing the total number of "main witnesses" to five). Dmitry Likhachev (1957) criticised 'inattentive scholars' who carelessly utilised Priselkov's 'reconstruction', treating all parts of it as equally reliable and running with it. Similarly, Iakov Lur'e (1976) rebuked uncritical readers for not understanding the differences in probability as expressed by Priselkov in the two font sizes, and treating it as if it were a 'text'.

Charles J. Halperin (2001) accused Lur'e of doing precisely what he told others not to do, namely, using Priselkov's tentative reconstruction of the Trinity Chronicle as a source. He also argued that, although her chronology was widely accepted by Soviet and Western scholars alike, Marina A. Salmina's 1960s–1970s textual analysis of the Trinity Chronicle should equally be considered invalidated by the fact that Priselkov's reconstruction was far from the reliability required to make such bold claims. He concluded that the reconstructed Trinity Chronicle was useless for dating purposes. Margaret Cecelia Ziolkowski (1978) had voiced similar arguments against Salmina's poor use of sources. Noting that in earlier publications of 1976 and 1981, Halperin himself had also tried to draw untenable historical conclusions from Priselkov's reconstruction before shifting his position by 2001 and criticising others for doing so, (Note: 'There is nevertheless a serious problem with the Trinity Chronicle – it no longer exists, for the original manuscript perished in the fire of Moscow in 1812, when Napoleon paid an unsolicited visit to the former Russian capital. No copy of the famous chronicle was made, although extensive quotations from it appeared in the History of the Russian State, published after the Napoleonic Wars by the official historian of Russia, Nikolai Karamzin. On the basis of these citations, M. D. Priselkov reconstructed the text of the lost chronicle, filling in the text between quotations with borrowings from other, obviously later, chronicles that in his highly informed opinion were closest to the lost text of the Trinity Chronicle. It was on this reconstructed text of the chronicle that Halperin based his conclusions. Although Priselkov's authority remains unchallenged, it is clear that observations made on the basis of his reconstruction rather than on the actual text of the chronicle are hypothetical. In his later studies, Halperin declined to treat Priselkov's reconstruction of the Trinity Chronicle as an authentic and reliable source and even criticized other scholars for doing so.') Serhii Plokhy (2006) argued that these earlier works 'are clearly in need of reexamination, given the hypothetical nature of Priselkov's reconstruction of the Trinity Chronicle'. In a 2010 review of Plokhy's book, which he generally praised, Halperin acknowledged using the reconstruction 'without much precision' for dating the translatio of the "Rus' land" concept, which he hadn't yet 'revised following the reclassification of the Trinity Chronicle as an invalid source because it is a reconstruction, not a "text."' Plokhy and Halperin agreed that of the three passages mentioning the "Rus' land" in the reconstruction, those under the years 1308 and 1328 were Priselkov's interpolations, while the sub anno 1332 passage – known from Karamzin's notes – appeared authentic, but too weak by itself to count as conclusive evidence of the translatio. In 2022, Halperin 'replaced citations to the Trinity Chronicle with references to the Simeonov Chronicle.' (Note: 'I had previously relied upon the Trinity Chronicle (Troitskaia letopis'), which purportedly dates to 1408 (...). However, I later concluded that a reconstruction could not be treated as a text (see Charles J. Halperin [2001]). I have now replaced citations to the Trinity Chronicle with references to the Simeonov Chronicle.')

Ostrowski (1981) remarked: 'Priselkov's reconstruction must be used cautiously because we do not know whether he always checked his readings against the manuscripts.' In their 2003 interlinear collation of the entire PVL, Ostrowski et al. 'included readings from Priselkov's reconstruction only up to the entry for 906. These readings are based on the plates of the early nineteenth-century attempt by Chebotarev and Cherepanov to publish the chronicle while the manuscript was still extant. [Since they] worked directly from the manuscript, the readings they present have a high probability of actually having been in the Trinity Chronicle, in contrast to the readings Priselkov has after 906, which, because they are conjectural, have a lower probability.' Halperin 2022 invoked Priselkov's reconstruction only one more time for an entry sub anno 955, commenting that 'This passage appears in large type, meaning it was quoted verbatim by Karamzin.'

== Bibliography ==
=== Primary sources ===
- Ostrowski, Donald, ed. (2003). The Povest' vremennykh let: An Interlinear Collation and Paradosis. 3 volumes (in Russian and English). Cambridge, MA: Harvard University Press. Archived from the original on 9 March 2005. (assoc. ed. David J. Birnbaum (Harvard Library of Early Ukrainian Literature, vol. 10, parts 1–3) – This 2003 Ostrowski et al. edition includes an interlinear collation including the five main manuscript witnesses, as well as a new paradosis ("a proposed best reading").
  - Ostrowski, Donald; Birnbaum, David J. (7 December 2014). "Rus' primary chronicle critical edition – Interlinear line-level collation". pvl.obdurodon.org (in Church Slavic). Archived from the original on 28 April 2025.
- Priselkov, M. D. (1950). Троицкая летопись. Реконструкция текста. Troitskaja letopis'. Rekonstruktsiia teksta [The Trinity Chronicle: Reconstruction of the Text] (in Russian). Moscow and Leningrad.

=== Literature ===
- Dimnik, Martin (January 2004). "The Title "Grand Prince" in Kievan Rus'". Mediaeval Studies. 66: 253–312. doi:10.1484/J.MS.2.306512.
- Gippius, Alexey A. (2014). "Reconstructing the original of the Povesť vremennyx let: a contribution to the debate". Russian Linguistics. 38 (3). Springer: 341–366. doi:10.1007/s11185-014-9137-y. JSTOR 43945126. S2CID 255017212.
- Halperin, Charles J. (2001). "Text and Textology: Salmina's Dating of the Chronicle Tales about Dmitrii Donskoi". Slavonic and East European Review. 79 (2): 248–263. doi:10.1353/see.2001.0046. S2CID 247621602.
- Halperin, Charles J. (2022). The Rise and Demise of the Myth of the Rus' Land (PDF). Leeds: Arc Humanities Press. p. 107. ISBN 9781802700565. Archived from the original (PDF) on 23 June 2023.
- Kloss, Boris M. (1994). "Determining the Authorship of the Trinity Chronicle". In Flier, Michael S.; Rowland, Daniel (eds.). Medieval Russian Culture. Volume 2. Berkeley: University of California Press. pp. 57–72. ISBN 9780520086388.
- Lunt, Horace G. (June 1994). "Lexical Variation in the Copies of the Rus' "Primary Chronicle": Some Methodological Problems". Ukrainian Philology and Linguistics. 18 (1–2). Harvard Ukrainian Research Institute: 10–28. JSTOR 41036551.
- Ostrowski, Donald (March 1981). "Textual Criticism and the Povest' vremennykh let: Some Theoretical Considerations". Harvard Ukrainian Studies. 5 (1). Harvard Ukrainian Research Institute: 11–31. JSTOR 41035890.
- Plokhy, Serhii (2006). The Origins of the Slavic Nations: Premodern Identities in Russia, Ukraine, and Belarus (PDF). New York: Cambridge University Press. pp. 10–15. ISBN 978-0-521-86403-9. Archived (PDF) from the original on 6 June 2011.
  - Halperin, Charles J. (2010). "Review Article. "National Identity in Premodern Rus'"". Russian History (Brill journal). 37 (3). Brill Publishers: 275–294. doi:10.1163/187633110X510446. Archived from the original on 26 March 2023. (review of Plokhy 2006, and a response to criticism)
