= Saint George Cathedral, Yuryev-Polsky =

Saint George Cathedral
- Георгиевский собор
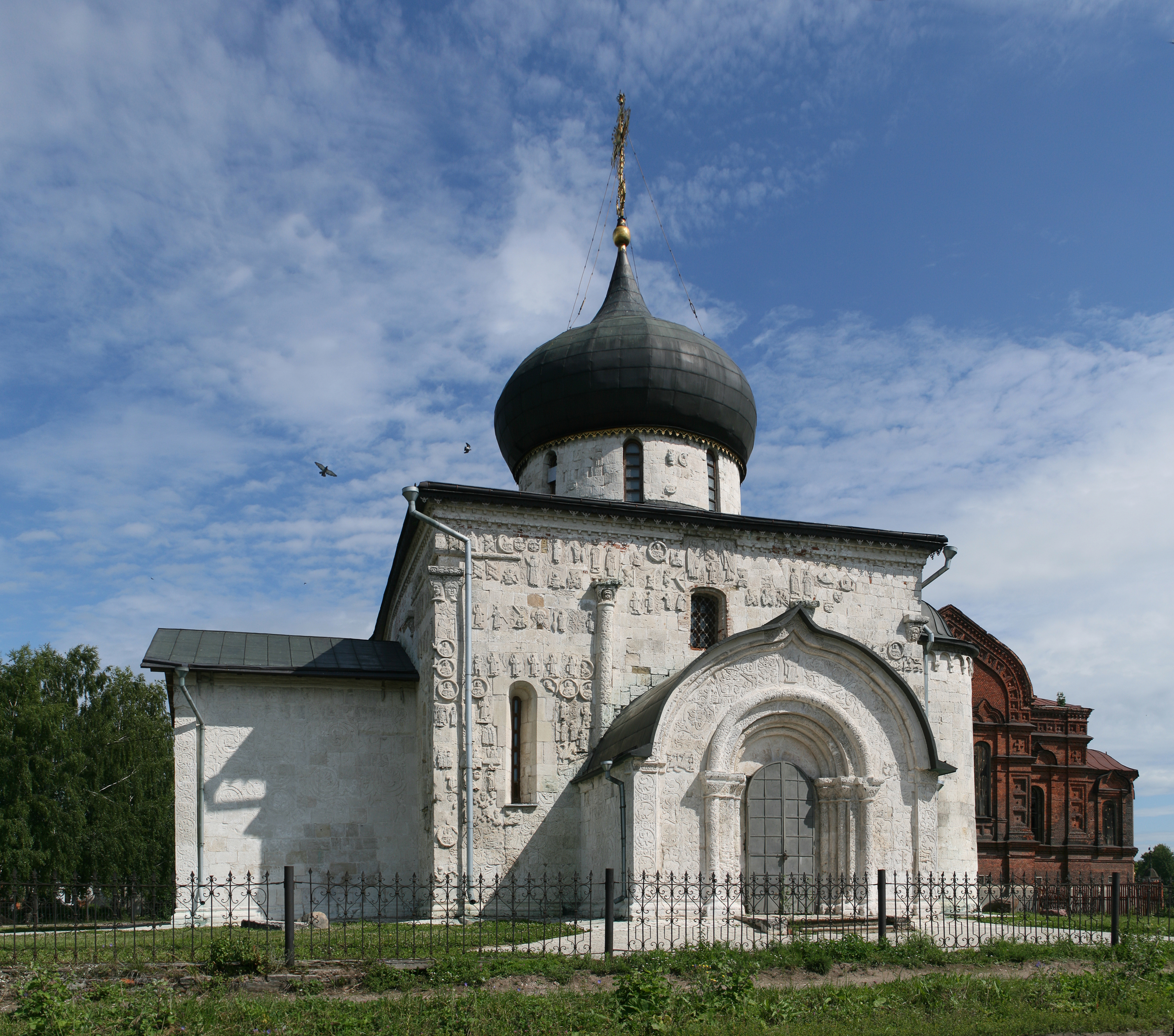
- The general view of the cathedral
- Saint George Cathedral
- 56°29′47″N 39°40′49″E
- Location: Yuryev-Polsky
- Country: Russia
- Denomination: Russian Orthodox

History
- Founded: 1230
- Founder: Sviatoslav III of Vladimir
- Dedication: Saint George

Architecture
- Architectural type: Cross-domed church
- Style: Early Muscovite architecture
- Groundbreaking: 1230
- Completed: 1234

Saint George Cathedral (Russian: Георгиевский собор) in Yuryev-Polsky is one of a dozen surviving white-stone churches which were built in Vladimir-Suzdal Principality in the northeastern Rus prior to the Mongol invasion. Constructed between 1230 and 1234, the cathedral was also the last of these churches to be built, completed just three years before the invasion. Unlike most of the other pre-Mongol Vladimir-Suzdal churches, the St. George Cathedral was not designated as the World Heritage site.

The cathedral was designated by the Russian government as an architectural monument of federal significance (#3310181000).

== History ==
In the 12th century, the political and cultural center of Rus slowly moved from Kiev to Vladimir. Yuryev-Polsky was founded by Yuri Dolgorukiy, prince of Rostov and Suzdal, in 1152. The name of the town derives from St. George (Russian Yuri is one of the versions of the name George). Yury Dolgorukiy also built the cathedral consecrated to St. George, which stood inside the fortress. It is presumed that the cathedral was similar to the Saint Saviour Cathedral in Pereslavl-Zalessky and to the Saint Boris and Saint Gleb Church in Kideksha, which survived to our days. Yuri's son, Andrey Bogolyubsky, moved the capital of the principality to Vladimir, and Yuryev-Polsky remained under the control of Vladimir princes until 1212.

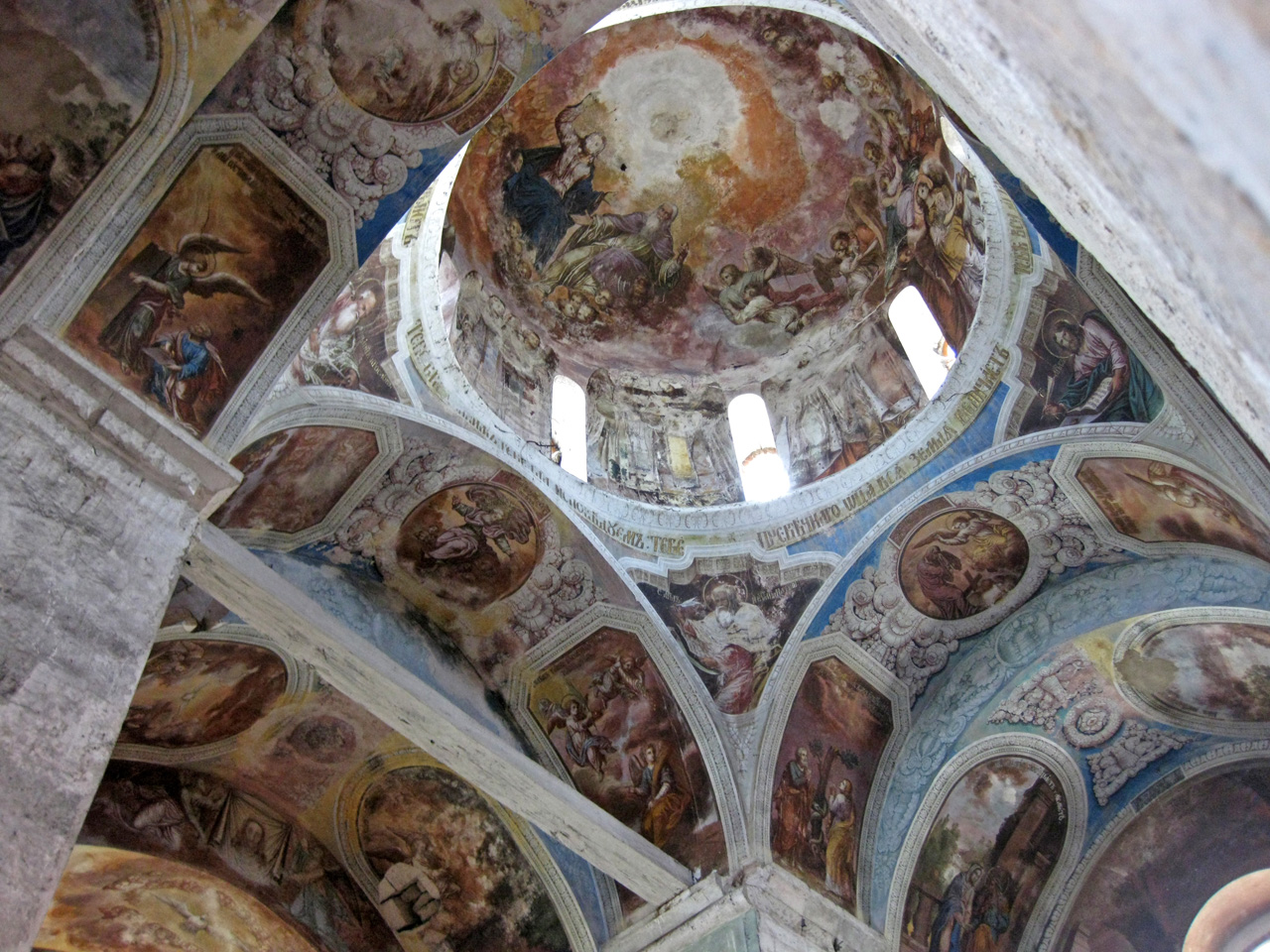
The interior, including the dome.

In 1212, Yuryev-Polsky became a center of a separate principality and given to Sviatoslav, a son of Vsevolod the Big Nest. By 1230, the old cathedral was considered to be irreparable, and Prince Sviatoslav personally supervised the construction of the new Saint George Cathedral, which was completed in four years. The new cathedral was considered to be a masterpiece, and used as an example by the builders of the Assumption Cathedral, the first stone building in Moscow, in 1326. The exterior of the cathedral was covered by stone carvings. In 1252, Sviatoslav was buried in the cathedral.

In the 1460s, the cathedral collapsed, which at the time was considered a national disaster. Vasili Yermolin was sent to Yuryev-Polsky to repair the building. He claimed to restore the cathedral in the original form, however, it became apparent later, that the new shape was far from the original, and some of the carvings lost their meaning. In the 17th century, a tent-roof bell-tower was erected next to the cathedral, and in the beginning of the 19th century, two new parts were appended to the building. In the 20th century, all of them were demolished, and the cathedral stands now in the middle of a meadow, so that there are panoramic views from all sides. In Soviet times, it was turned into a museum.

== Architecture ==
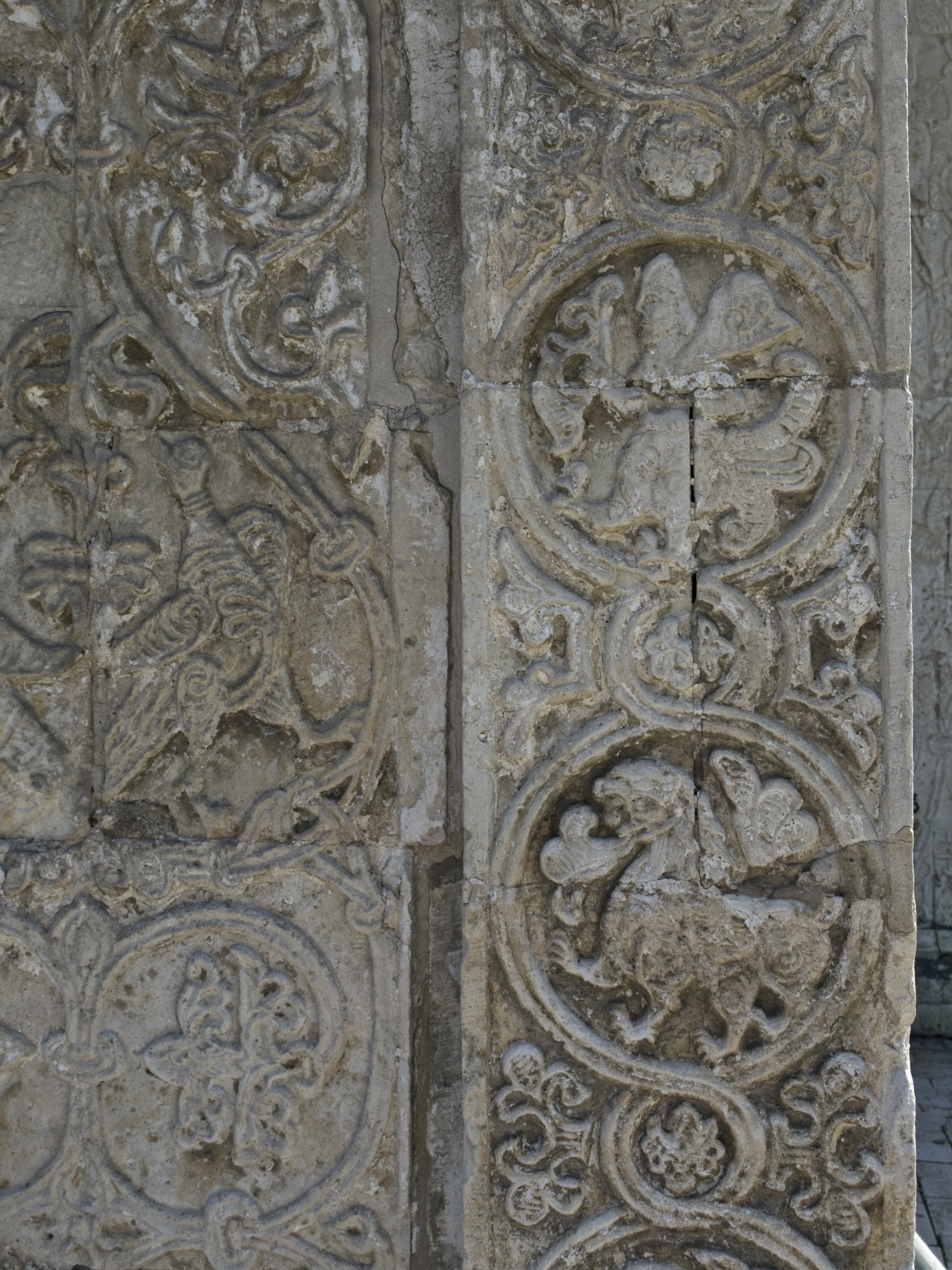
Detail of the stone carving, eastern portal

The cathedral is and was originally built asymmetrically. Its main volume is a square supported by four columns in the middle. The columns are square in cross-section. The eastern side is an apse.

During the collapse in the 15th century the northern wall survived the best. All other walls were partially destroyed (the southern wall suffered the most of all), and, in particular, much of the stone carving from the exterior of the cathedral was torn in pieces. Although at the time the exterior stone carving were considered to be out-of-fashion, Yermolin during the restoration works made attempts to put the stories together. In particular, he was able to put together two stones with the Holy Trinity image in the south portal. However, since there were panoramic images of the whole surface of the cathedral prior to the collapse, and many of the carved stones were destroyed, Yermolin was not able to identified all the stories, and put many stones in random order. Some of the stories were actually used for construction, and their carvings were buried inside the walls; other stones landed in neighboring farms. Some of the latter were later recovered by Pyotr Baranovsky during the Soviet times renovation. Currently, most of the original carvings have been reconstructed on paper.

The stone carvings of the St. George Cathedral combine human and animal forms, performed as reliefs, with floral ornamental motives, carried out in the fine carving techniques. This combination has been known in frescoes of Saint Boris and Saint Gleb Church in Kideksha and of the Nativity Cathedral in Suzdal, however, for the sculpture, the combination is unique for Rus. It is thought that the stone carvings were done by two groups of artists. One, consisting of 12 artists, was doing the reliefs, whereas another group of 18-24 was working on the floral ornaments.
