= Origo regis Jagyelo et Wytholdi ducum Lithuanie =

Origo regis Jagyelo et Wytholdi ducum Lithuanie ("The origin of King Jagiello and Vytautas, the Duke of Lithuania") (Note: Ukrainian: Похо́дження короля́ Яга́йла і Віто́вта, кня́зів лито́вських.) is a Belarusian-Lithuanian chronicle written in Latin in the 15th century. It's sometimes abbreviated as Origo regis.

== Contents ==
The chronicle describes the events of the early history of the Grand Duchy of Lithuania, lists the sons of Gediminas, mentions the reign of Algirdas, the flight of Vytautas to the Teutonic Order, and so on. It is a translation of the 14th-century Ruthenian chronicle The Origin of the Lithuanian Family (Литовському роду починок Litovskomu rodu pochinok, also known as Літописець великих князів литовських, The Chronicler of the Grand Dukes of Lithuania).

== Provenance and publishing history ==
The manuscript was located in the third volume of the Libri legationum of the Metrica Regni Poloniae (the former State Archives of the Polish Kingdom, which was taken away by the Russians and stored in the Moscow Main Archives of the Ministry of Internal Affairs).

The editio princeps was published in 1888 in Lviv (then Lemberg) by Polish historian Antoni Prochaska. It was then published as a chronicle in the Complete Collection of Rus' Chronicles (PSRL), Volume 17 in 1907. According to Prochaska, this chronicle is a complete or partial Latin translation of a chronicle written in Early Ruthenian, allegedly commissioned by Jan Długosz; this translation was included in the Metrica Regni Poloniae at the end of the 15th and beginning of the 16th centuries. Jan Długosz used it in the introduction to the 10th book of the Annales seu cronicae inclyti regni Poloniae oper. The original text has been somewhat distorted in translation, but the chronicle contains information that is not found in other sources.

When publishing the chronicle in the PSRL, the compiler Stanisław Ptaszycki compared it with well-known chronicles, and mistakenly noted that it was preserved in the documents of the Lithuanian Metrica. Ptaszycki published the chronicle based on the original, without noting the differences from Prochaska's edition (they concern a number of letters: u instead of v in Prochaska, ch instead of th; some proper names: Połoczko instead of Płoczko in Prochaska). Other editions, not checked against the original, give preference to Ptaszycki's text.

== Sources ==
- Prochaska, Antoni (1888). "Przekład ruskiego latopisca ks. Litewskiego na jązyk łaciński" [Translation of the Ruthenian chronicle of the Lithuanian dukes into Latin]. Kwartalnik Historyczny (in Polish). 2 (2). Lwów: Polish Historical Society: 196–205. (pp. 196–201: article; pp. 201–205: chronicle).
- Origo regis Jagello et Wytholdi ducum Lithuanie // Полное собрание русских летописей (ПСРЛ). Том 17. Западнорусские летописи. 1907. С. 219-226.
- Origo regis Jagello et Wytholdi ducum Lithuanie // Полное собрание русских летописей (ПСРЛ). Т.35. Летописи белорусско-литовские. / Сост. и автор предисл. Н. Н. Улащик. М., Наука. 1980.
- Lietuvos metraščiai // Tarybų Lietuvos enciklopedija. Zinkus, Jonas; et al., eds.. 2. Vilnius: Vyriausioji enciklopedijų redakcija. 1989. pp. 584–585.

== Literature ==
- Улащик H.H.Передмова до Origo regis Jagello et Wytholdi ducum Lithuanie // Полное собрание русских летописей (ПСРЛ). Т.35. Летописи белорусско-литовские. / Сост. и автор предисл. Н. Н. Улащик. М., Наука. 1980.
- Mickūnaitè, Giedrè (2002). "From Pamphlet to Origin Theory: The Establishment of Lithuanian Dynastic Tradition". The Medieval Chronicle. 2. Brill: 156–165. ISSN 1567-2336. JSTOR 45374162.
- "Belarusian Studies". The Year's Work in Modern Language Studies. 71: 842–852. 2011. doi:10.5699/yearworkmodlang.71.2009.0842.
