= A Journey Beyond the Three Seas =

15th-century Russian travelogue

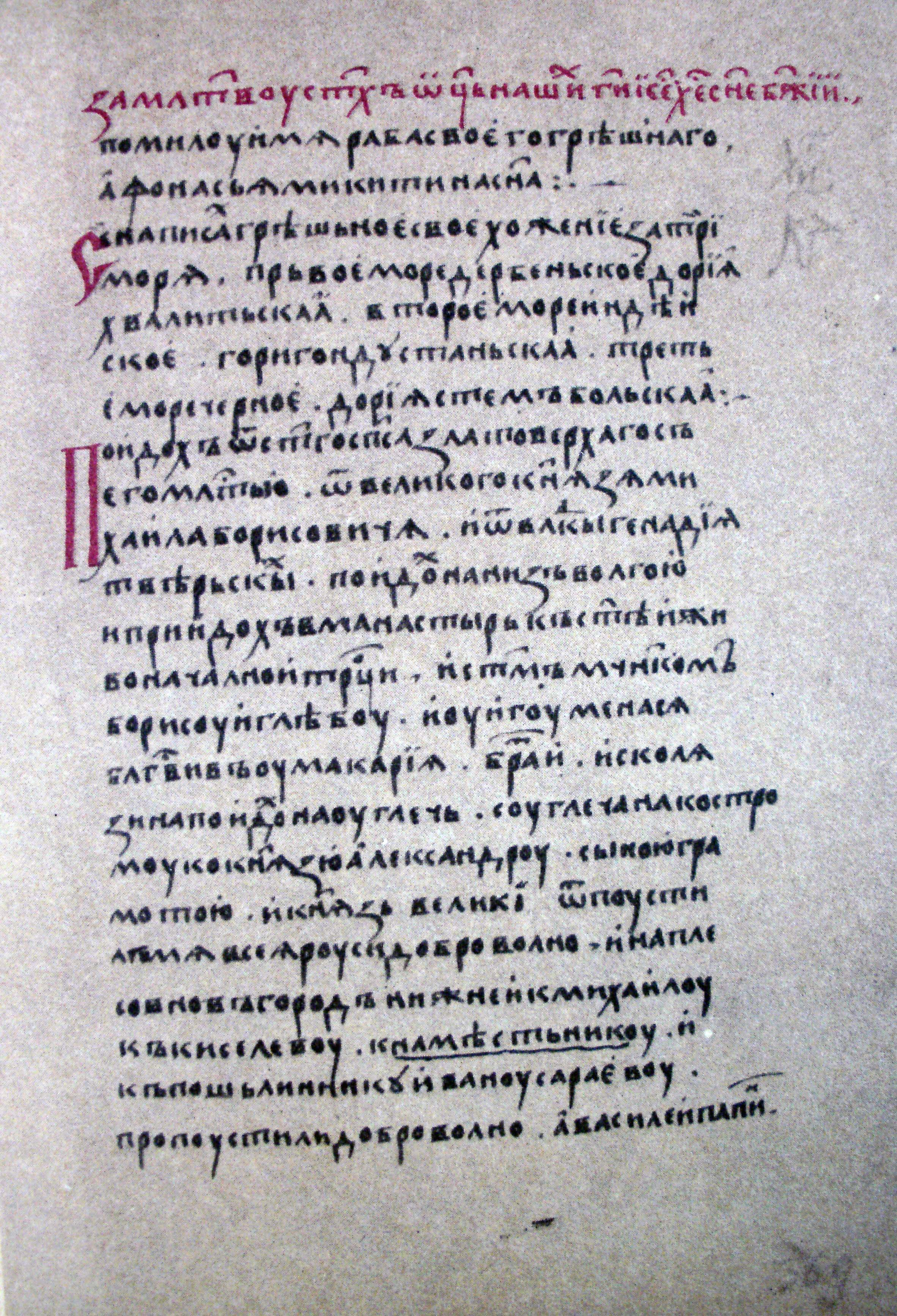
Page from the original book

A Journey Beyond the Three Seas (Russian: Хожение за три моря, romanized: Khozheniye za tri morya) is a Russian travelogue in the form of travel notes, made by Afanasy Nikitin, a merchant from Tver, during his journey to the Indian subcontinent in 1466–1472.

A Journey Beyond the Three Seas was the first Russian literary work to depict a strictly commercial, non-religious trip. Prior texts were pilgrimage texts, which depicted travel to holy sites and were more standardized, dry and conventional. The author visited the Caucasus, Persia, India and the Crimea. However, most of the notes are dedicated to India, its political structure, trade, agriculture, customs and ceremonies. The work is full of lyrical digressions and autobiographic passages. There is a strong individual, authorial presence. Its last page is in Turkic and broken Arabic; these are, in fact, typical Muslim prayers, indicating that Nikitin might have converted to Islam while he was in India, although his lapse from Christianity bothered him as he mentions several times in the text.

On the other hand Nikitin consistently prays to Blessed Virgin Mary as Theotokos, Christian Orthodox Saints, tries to observe Christian rites, and so on. The author did not make his way back to his native land; he died on the trip home. In 1475, the manuscript made its way to Moscow into the hands of a government official by the name of Vasili Mamyrev. Later on, it was incorporated into the annalistic code of 1489, the Sofia Second Chronicle and the Lvov Chronicle.
