= Vasili Yermolin =

Russian architect and sculptor

Vasili Dmitriyevich Yermolin (Russian: Василий Дмитриевич Ермолин) (? – died between 1481 and 1485) was a Russian architect and sculptor.

== Biography ==
Vasili Yermolin is known to have been a merchant, contractor, and head of an artel of the Muscovite builders. In 1462, he restored the old parts of the whitestone walls of the Moscow Kremlin from the Sviblov Tower (known as the Vodovzvodnaya Tower today) to the Borovitskiye Gates. Also, Vasili Yermolin rebuilt the Frolovskiye Gates (today's Spasskiye Gates) in 1462-1464 and decorated them with polychrome reliefs depicting St George and St. Demetrius, protectors of the Muscovite princes. A fragment of the St. George relief is now on display in the State Tretyakov Gallery. The second relief was lost. Judging by the looks of the surviving fragment, both of them represented the finest examples of the old Russian sculpture. During the reconstruction of the Spasskaya Tower by an Italian architect Pietro Antonio Solari, these reliefs were affixed onto it and remained there until they redesigned its top in 1624–1625. Vasili Yermolin restored a church of the Ascension Monastery (Вознесенский монастырь) in the Kremlin between 1467 and 1469. In 1469, he built a refectory for the Troitse-Sergiyeva Lavra which did not survive and renovated the church on top of the Golden Gate in Vladimir. In 1471, Yermolin was sent to rebuild the ancient Cathedral of St. George in Yuriev-Polsky, which had just collapsed. In 1472, he took part in preparations for the construction of the Assumption Cathedral in the Kremlin.

At the request of Yermolin, they compiled the so-called Yermolin Chronicle, which contained information on different aspects of architecture and construction. There is speculation that some of the text was written by Yermolin himself.
