= Chroniclers of Volyn and Ukraine =

The Chroniclers of Volyn (Volhynia) and Ukraine (Ukrainian: Літописці Волині і України, romanized: Litopystsi Volyni i Ukrajiny (LVU)) is a historical work by an unknown author (or several authors), compiled in the first half of the 17th century. It is divided into 12 separate collections of historical records based on Old Rus', Ukrainian, Belarusian, and Polish chronicles, annals, and memoirs.

== Contents ==
Of the 12 collections, the most important in terms of content and volume is the seventh, the so-called Kyiv collection, which uses materials from ancient Rus' chronicles, as well as the chronicles of Maciej Stryjkowski and Marcin Bielski. In the Chroniclers of Volyn and Ukraine (LVU), the history of Ukraine-Rus' is linked to the history of Lithuania, Poland, and Muscovy, and is chronologically traced back to 1621. The subject of this chronicle is mainly foreign policy events. These records reflect the historical views of the ruling circles of Ukraine, which linked their interests with the Grand Duchy of Lithuania. The author has a negative attitude towards the Cossacks and Cossack movements. The Kyiv collection ends with the records of Bohdan Balyka, a burgher of Kyiv. As an eyewitness to historical events, he provides a number of important information about the siege of the Polish forces in Moscow in 1612 by the Russian people's militia. Balyka also notes the negative attitude of the Ukrainian people towards the Polish authorities, especially the Catholic Church and the 1596 Union of Brest. The LVU is written in a language close to the Ukrainian vernacular of the 17th century, known as Late Ruthenian or early modern Ukrainian.

== Sources ==
- Гайдай Л. Історія України в особах, термінах, назвах і поняттях.-Луцьк: Вежа, 2000. (Haydai L., History of Ukraine in persons, terms, names and concepts. - Lutsk: Vezha, 2000.)
- Рад. енциклопедія історії України.- К., 1971.- т.3. (Soviet Encyclopaedia of the History of Ukraine. Kyiv, 1971. - vol. 3.)
- Мыцык Ю.А. Украинские летописи ХVII века. Днепропетровск, 1978. (Mytsyk Yu.A., Ukrainian Chronicles of the 17th Century. Dnepropetrovsk, 1978.)
