= Novgorod Fourth Chronicle =

15th century Russian chronicle

The Novgorod Fourth Chronicle (Russian: Новгородская четвёртая летопись, romanized: Novgorodskaya chetvertaya letopis') is a Rus' chronicle of the 15th century. It is scholarly abbreviated as N4. It is traditionally called "Fourth" according to the order of the modern publication of Novgorod chronicles, rather than chronologically.

Together with the Sofia First Chronicle, it is believed that it is derived from a common source. Russian philologist Aleksey Shakhmatov tentatively called it the Novgorodsko-Sofiysky Svod (Novgorod-Sofia Corpus) and initially dated it to 1448, but later revised his opinion to the 1430s. Some Russian philologists shared his opinion, while others attribute the common source to the 1418 Corpus of Photius, Metropolitan of Moscow.

== See also ==
- Complete Collection of Russian Chronicles (PSRL)

== Bibliography ==
- Dimnik, Martin (January 2004). "The Title "Grand Prince" in Kievan Rus'". Mediaeval Studies. 66: 253–312. doi:10.1484/J.MS.2.306512.
