= Yermolin Chronicle =

15th-century Russian chronicle

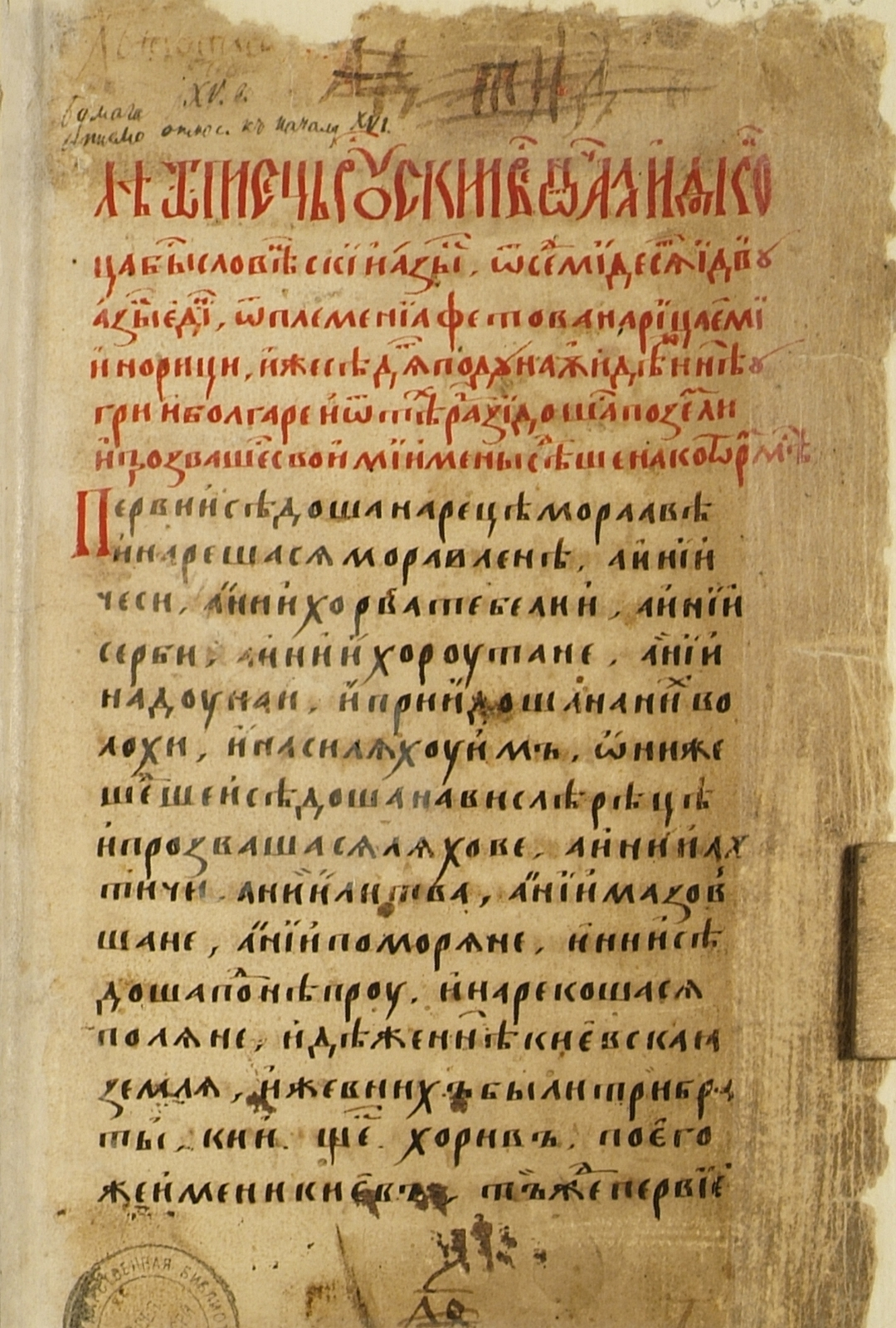
- Original title: Ермолинская летопись
- Publication date: 15th century
- Publication place: Russia

The Yermolin Chronicle (also spelled Ermolin Chronicle; Russian: Ермолинская летопись) is a 15th-century Russian chronicle compiled in Moscow and named for the master builder Vasili Yermolin, whose workshop is credited with initiating the text.

It survives in a single manuscript published in 1910 as volume 23 of the Complete Collection of Russian Chronicles and is valued for its detailed coverage of Muscovite politics, monastic affairs and architectural practice between roughly 1460 and 1472.

== History ==
Most researchers agree that Yermolin commissioned the compilation and may have inserted notes on stone construction himself, although the precise identity of the scribes remains disputed. Internal chronology and linguistic analysis place the work’s completion in the late 1460s or early 1470s, with its last dated entry aligning it closely to the North Russian svod of 1472. The sole codex appears to have been copied at the Kirillo-Belozersky Monastery before entering state archives, where the Archaeographic Commission produced the 1910 scholarly edition that underpins modern study.

Narrative includes a report on the absorption of Yaroslavl in 1463, analysed by Gail Lenhoff as a rare piece of Muscovite propaganda justifying territorial expansion. The chronicle also describes Ivan III's 1471 campaign against Novgorod, a passage recently re-examined for its inflation of troop numbers relative to parallel sources. Unique architectural notices record the installation of Yermolin's polychrome reliefs of Saints George and Demetrius on the Kremlin's Frolov Gate, offering primary evidence for early Muscovite sculpture.

Lev Yure highlighted the work's independence from metropolitan compilations, arguing that it reflects the intellectual autonomy of Kirillo-Belozersky scribes during the era of Ivan III's centralising reforms. Contemporary scholars continue working on the chronicle for liturgical iconography and genealogical interpolations, confirming its value for cultural and political history.
