= Novgorod First Chronicle =

Rus' literary work

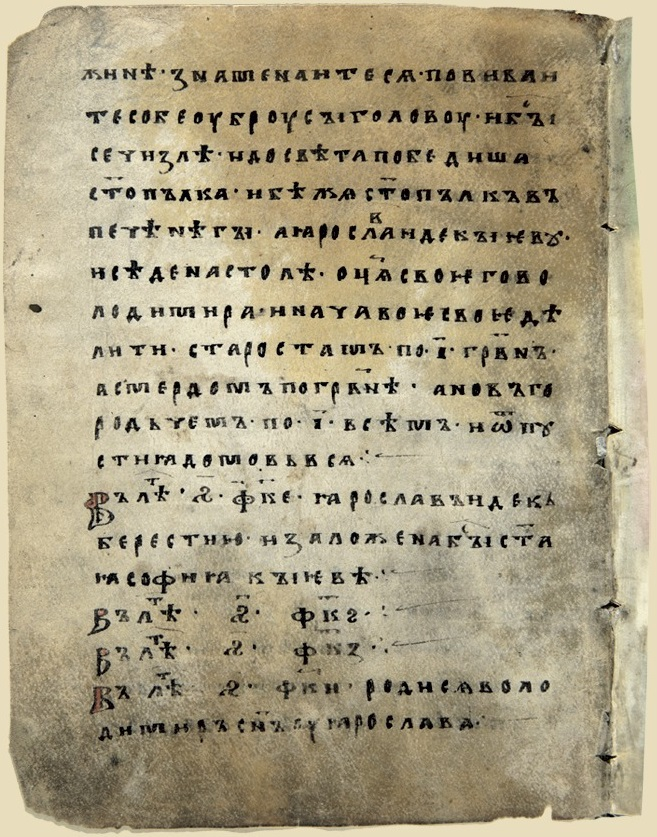
- First sheet of the Synod Scroll, dated to the 13th/14th century.
- Original title: Russian: Новгородская первая летопись, romanized: Novgorodskaya pervaya letopisʹ
- Also known as: NPL
- Language: Old East Slavic
- Manuscript(s): Synod Scroll; Commission Scroll; Academic Scroll

The Novgorod First Chronicle (Russian: Новгородская первая летопись, romanized: Novgoródskaya pérvaya létopisʹ, IPA: [nəvɡɐˈrot͡skəjə ˈpʲervəjə ˈlʲetəpʲɪsʲ], commonly abbreviated as NPL), also known by its 1914 English edition title The Chronicle of Novgorod, 1016–1471, is the oldest extant Rus' chronicle of the Novgorod Republic. Written in Old East Slavic, it reflects a literary tradition about Kievan Rus' which differs from the Primary Chronicle.

The earliest extant copy of the NPL is the so-called Synod Scroll (Sinodálʹnyy), dated to the second half of the 13th century. First printed in 1841, it is currently preserved in the State Historical Museum. It is the earliest known manuscript of a major Old East Slavic chronicle, predating the Laurentian Codex of the Primary Chronicle by almost a century. In the 14th century, the Synod Scroll was continued by the monks of the Yuriev Monastery in Novgorod. Other important copies of the Novgorod First Chronicle include the Academic Scroll (Akademícheskiy) and Commission Scroll (Komissiónnyy)), both dating to the 1440s, and the Tolstoi (Tolstóvoi) copy. This "Younger Redaction" (Note: Russian: Новгородская первая летопись младшая редакция, romanized: Novgoródskaya pérvaya létopisʹ mládshaya redáktsiya, lit. 'Novgorod First Chronicle in Its Later Redaction'.) contains entries from the year 854 up to 1447.

== Contents and style ==
=== Synod Scroll ===
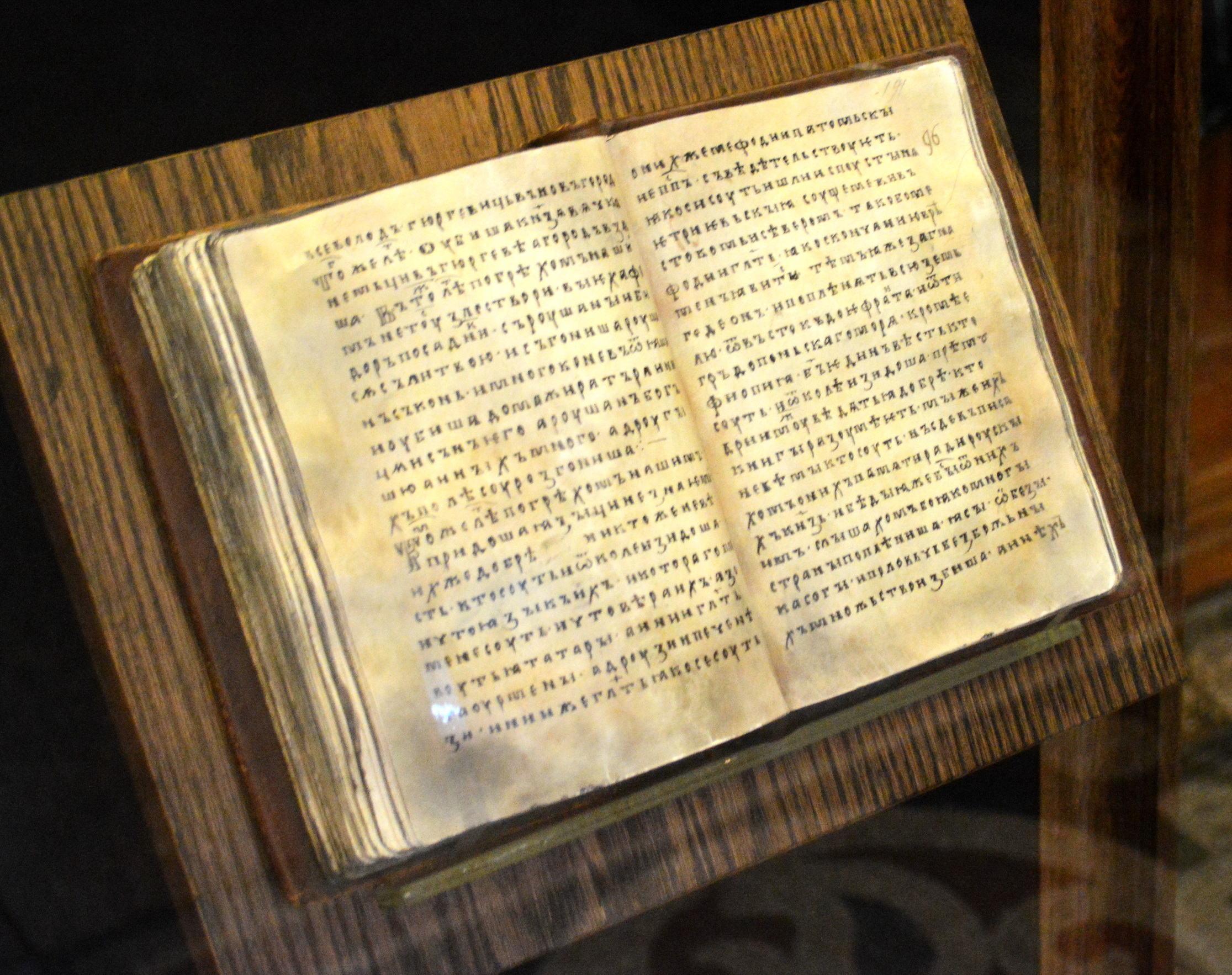
The Synod Scroll on display in 2012 in the State Historical Museum

Fully scanned NPL Synod Scroll (click to open full PDF)

The beginning of the Synod Scroll or "Older Edition" of the Novgorod First Chronicle is missing. The surviving text starts in the middle of a sentence in the year 1016, during the Kievan succession crisis between Yaroslav and Sviatopolk. The lost contents of the Synod Scroll before the year 1016 are unknown, and can only be speculated about. Soviet researcher Oleg Viktorovich (1987) asserted that later editions of the chronicle reflect a lost Primary Kievan Code (Russian: Начальный Киевский свод) of the late 11th century, which contained information not present in the later Primary Chronicle (PVL). But in her doctoral dissertation, The Chronicle and the Chronograph (2015), Ukrainian historian Tetyana Vilkul demonstrated that the Novgorod First Chronicle in the Younger Redaction (Younger NPL) has been contaminated by the PVL, so that the PVL text must necessarily be older, and the Younger NPL text reflected the 14th- or 15th-century chronographs and could not be an archetype for the PVL text.

The Synod Scroll was written in several stages by different hands. The oldest parts have been palaeographically dated to the second half of the 13th century. Later passages such as the entry on the Battle of Lake Peipus (1242) have been dated to the middle of the 14th century.

=== Commission Scroll ===
The Archaeographic Commission (Komissiónnyy) copy of the Novgorod First Chronicle, which stems from the mid-15th century, contains at the beginning two genealogies and a chronological regnal list of Rus' princes; all three of them begin with "Rurik". This is in sharp contrast with the Hypatian Codex (compiled c. 1425), wherein the list of knyazi ("princes") of Kiev starts with "Dir and Askold", followed by "Oleg", and then "Igor", and does not mention "Rurik" at all. Similarly, the chronology at the start of the Laurentian Codex (compiled 1377) makes no mention of "Rurik", but starts the regnal list of Rus' princes from the year in which Oleg took up residence in Kiev. (Note: According to the Laurentian Codex's chronology, Oleg supposedly began to reign as prince in Kiev 29 years after Byzantine emperor Michael III began to reign, which it claims was the year 860, although that year is known to be incorrect, since Michael III acceded on 21 January 842. The narrative part of the Laurentian Codex mentions the also incorrect year 852.)

The narrative part of the NPL starts from the legendary origins of Rus' and its last records refer to mid-15th century events. It describes the accession to the throne of the princes of Novgorod, the elections of major officials such as tysyatsky and posadnik, building of churches and monasteries, epidemics and military campaigns.

=== Academic Scroll ===
The Academic (Akademícheskiy) copy of the NPL dates from the mid-15th century, came into the possession of Vasily Tatishchev, and was acquired in 1737 by the Library of the Russian Academy of Sciences, Saint Petersburg, where it is currently being preserved with registration number "17.8.36".

=== Style ===
The chronicle is notable for its focus on local events, lack of stylistic embellishments and the use of local dialect.

The Novgord First Chronicle (NPL), just like the Primary Chronicle (PVL) and the Kievan Chronicle, follows a formulaic practice in which the reign of any given prince is legitimised by pointing out that he "sat on the throne of his father" and often "his grandfather" before that, or occasionally "his brother" or "his uncle". The reason for that is that if a man's father (or other close male relative) did not sit on that same throne, that man was izgoi, ineligible to rule.

== Parallels with pagan beliefs ==
The chronicle describes the actions of the Volkhvs (Magi) who became the leaders of rebellions in 1024 and 1071. Historian Igor Froyanov analysed a scene from the Novgorod First Chronicle in which the Magi talk about the creation of man. According to legend, under the year 1071, two Magi appeared in Novgorod and began to sow turmoil, claiming that soon the Dnieper will flow backwards and the land will move from place to place.

Yan Vyshatich asked: "how do you think man came to be?" The Magi answered: "God bathed in the bath and sweated, wiped himself with a rag and threw it from heaven to the earth; and the devil created man, and God put his soul into him. Therefore, when a person dies, the body goes to the earth, and the soul goes to God"

— Novgorod Chronicle

Froyanov was the first to draw attention to the similarity of the text with the Mordovian-Finn legend about the creation of man by God (Cham-Pas) and the devil (Shaitana). In the retelling of Melnikov-Pechersky, this legend sounds like this:

Shaitan modeled the body of a man from clay, sand and earth; he came out with a pig, then a dog, then reptiles. Shaitan wanted to make a man in the image and likeness of Cham-Pas. Then Shaitan called a mouse-bird and ordered it to build a nest in one end of the towel with which Cham-Pas wipes himself when he goes to the bath, and to breed children there: one end will become heavier and the towel with a carnation from the uneven weight will fall to the ground. Shaitan picked up the fallen towel and wiped his cast with it, and the man received the image and likeness of God. After that, Shaitan began to revive a person, but he could not put a living soul into him. The soul was breathed into the man by Cham-Pas. There was a long dispute between Shaitan and Cham-Pas: who should a person belong to? Finally, when Cham-pas got tired of arguing, he offered to divide the person, after the death of a person, the soul should go to heaven to Cham-pas, who blew it, and the body rots, decomposes and goes to Shaitan.

— Melnikov-Pechersky

The similarity of the legend with the words of the Magi under the year 1071 (presumably they were of Finnic origin) indicates that the worldview of the Magi of that period was no longer pagan, but was a symbiosis of Christianity with folk beliefs.

== Influence ==
The text of the Novgorod First Chronicle was repeatedly used in other Novgorod chronicles. It became one of the main sources of the so-called Novgorodsko-Sofiysky Svod, which in turn served as the protograph of the Novgorod Fourth Chronicle and Sofia First Chronicle. The Novgorodsko-Sofiysky Svod was included in the all-Rus' chronicle of the 15th-16th centuries. Independently it was reflected in the Tver chronicle.

== Bibliography ==
=== Online editions ===
- Michell, Robert; Forbes, Nevill (1914). The Chronicle of Novgorod 1016–1471. Translated from the Russian by Robert Michell and Nevill Forbes, Ph.D. Reader in Russian in the University of Oxford, with an introduction by C. Raymond Beazley and A. A. Shakhmatov (PDF). London: Gray's Inn. p. 237.
- Pdf scans of the text, in modern spelling
- Foreword and text (2000 edition)
- Foreword and text (1950 edition)
- Izbornyk (2001). "Новгородская Первая Летопись Младшего Извода" [Novgorod First Chronicle of the Younger Edition]. Izbornyk (in Church Slavic). – digitised version of the mid-15th-century Archaeographic Commission's edition (or "Younger Edition") of the Novgorod First Chronicle (Komissionnyy NPL)

=== Literature ===
- Dimnik, Martin (January 2004). "The Title "Grand Prince" in Kievan Rus'". Mediaeval Studies. 66: 253–312. doi:10.1484/J.MS.2.306512.
- Isoaho, Mari (2018). "Shakhmatov's Legacy and the Chronicles of Kievan Rus'". Kritika: Explorations in Russian and Eurasian History. 19 (3). Slavica Publishers: 637–648. doi:10.1353/kri.2018.0033.
- Maiorov, Alexander V. (November 2018). ""I Would Sacrifice Myself for my Academy and its Glory!" August Ludwig von Schlözer and the Discovery of the Hypatian Chronicle". Russian History. 45 (4). Brill: 319–340. doi:10.1163/18763316-04504002. JSTOR 27072372.
- Ostrowski, Donald, ed. (2003). The Povest' vremennykh let: An Interlinear Collation and Paradosis. 3 volumes (in Russian and English). Cambridge, MA: Harvard University Press. Archived from the original on 2005-03-09. (assoc. ed. David J. Birnbaum (Harvard Library of Early Ukrainian Literature, vol. 10, parts 1–3)) – This 2003 Ostrowski et al. edition includes an interlinear collation including the five main manuscript witnesses, as well as a new paradosis ("a proposed best reading").
- Ostrowski, Donald (2006). "Alexander Nevskii's 'Battle on the Ice': The Creation of a Legend". Russian History/Histoire Russe. 33 (2/4). Brill: 289–312. ISSN 0094-288X. JSTOR 24664446.
- Ostrowski, Donald (2018). "Was There a Riurikid Dynasty in Early Rus'?". Canadian-American Slavic Studies. 52 (1): 30–49. doi:10.1163/22102396-05201009.
