= Sofia First Chronicle =

Russian chronicle

The Sofia First Chronicle (Russian: Софийская первая летопись, romanized: Sofiyskaya pervaya letopis') is a Rus' chronicle from the 15th century associated with the Cathedral of St. Sophia, Novgorod. It is scholarly abbreviated as S1 or SPL. Its copies exist in two versions: Early Redaction (starshy izvod), which ends in 1418, and Later Redaction (mladshy izvod), with sporadic additions up to 1471, and up to 1508 in one of the copies.

Together with the Novgorod Fourth Chronicle, it is believed that it is derived from a common source. Russian philologist Aleksey Shakhmatov tentatively called it the Novgorodsko-Sofiysky Svod (Novgorod-Sofia Corpus) and initially dated it to 1448, but later revised his opinion to the 1430s. Some Russian philologists shared his opinion, while others attribute the common source to the 1418 Corpus of Photius, Metropolitan of Moscow.

== See also ==
- Academic Chronicle (Moscow Academic Manuscript)
- Complete Collection of Russian Chronicles (PSRL)
- Sofia Second Chronicle
- Radziwiłł Chronicle (Königsberg Manuscript)

== Bibliography ==
- Dimnik, Martin (January 2004). "The Title "Grand Prince" in Kievan Rus'". Mediaeval Studies. 66: 253–312. doi:10.1484/J.MS.2.306512.
- Tvauri, Andres (2012). The Migration Period, Pre-Viking Age, and Viking Age in Estonia. pp. 33, 34, 59, 60, 368. Archived from the original on 23 October 2021.
