= Novgorodsko-Sofiysky Svod =

15th-century Russian chronicle

"[T]extual comparisons of reconstructed non-texts [the Trinity Chronicle] with hypothetical non-texts [the Compilation of 1448] in order to determine textual primacy cannot be definitive. (...) Inventing new hypothetical compilations or redating old hypothetical compilations is fun, but not terribly productive."

— Charles J. Halperin (2001)

The Novgorodsko-Sofiysky Svod (Russian: Новгородско-Софийский свод, lit. 'Novgorod-Sofia Compilation') is a tentative name for a hypothetical common source for the Novgorod Fourth Chronicle and the Sofia First Chronicle, according to Russian philologist Aleksey Shakhmatov.

Shakhmatov initially dated it by the year 1448, hence it also used to be called the 1448 compilation (Russian: свод 1448 года), but later revised his opinion to the 1430s. Some Russian philologists shared his opinion, while others attribute the common source to the 1418 compilation of Metropolitan Photius.

== See also ==
- Complete Collection of Russian Chronicles
