= Boris Kloss =

Russian archeologist and professor (1932-)

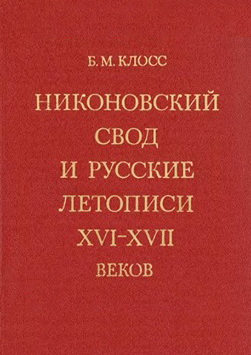
The Nikon Chronicle and the Russian Chronicles of the 16th-17th centuries, published by Nauka in 1980

Boris Mikhailovich Kloss (Russian: Борис Михайлович Клосс, IPA: [bɐˈrʲis mʲɪˈxɐlaɪvʲɪtɕ klos]; born 19 December 1932) is a Russian historian, source critic, specialist in palaeography and archaeography, a university professor, Doctor of History (1989); head of the History of Religion and Church Centre, Honorary Doctor of the European University (2003), member of the International Association of the Old Slavic Studies (1992). He studied under Andrey Kolmogorov, Lev Cherepnin, and Militsa Nechkina.

Kloss was born in Moscow in the family of a military man. He graduated from the Mechanics and Mathematics Faculty of the Moscow State University in 1956. In 1958 he started working for the USSR Institute of Automatics. Since 1971 he worked at the USSR Institute of History under the Russian Academy of Sciences. He completed the thesis in the topic The Nikon Chronicle and the Russian Chronicles of the 16th-17th centuries. In 1980-1990 he simultaneously taught at the Moscow State University, the Moscow Institute of Physics and Technology and Russian State University for the Humanities. He became a renowned specialist in Kievan Rus' literature, specifically in Russian hagiography. He lectured in various universities of the United States, Poland, Norway, Russia.

== Publications ==
- The Nikon Chronicle and the Russian Chronicles of the 16th-17th centuries (Russian: Никоновский свод и русские летописи XVI-XVII веков), 1980
- Life of St. Sergius of Radonezh (Russian: Житие Сергия Радонежского: Рукописная традиция), 1998
- On the Russian Hagiography of the 14th-16th centuries (Russian: Очерки по истории русской агиографии XIV–XVI вв.), 2001
- On the Origin of the name of Russia (Russian: О происхождении названия «Россия»), 2012
- Chernyshevsky at the Head of Revolutionaries of 1861 (Russian: Чернышевский во главе революционеров 1861 года), 1981
- Editor of the modern edition of the Complete Collection of Russian Chronicles.
