= Ostroh Chronicler =

1971 critical edition of the Ostroh Chronicler by Oleksandr A. Bevzo

The Ostroh Chronicler (Ukrainian: Остро́зький літо́писець, romanized: Ostróz'kyy litópysets') is a Ukrainian chronicle of the late 30s of the 17th century. The NASU Institute of Ukrainian Language has designated it as a monument of the Ukrainian language (Ukrainian: Пам'ятка української мови, romanized: Pam'yatka ukrajins'koj movy).

== Overview ==
The Ostroh Chronicler is not only a historical source, but also a monument of the Ukrainian language and literature. The Ostroh Chronicler has survived in the only known manuscript entitled: From the Chronicles of Bielski's Collection of Necessities Selected, discovered by academician M. M. Tikhomirov in a codex in the museum collection of the State Historical Museum in Moscow and published by him in 1951 under the title Ostroh Chronicler. This title is fully consistent with the content of the main part of the work, which focuses on the city of Ostroh (modern Rivne Oblast) and the events in Ostroh.

== Contents ==
The entire chronicle covers the period from 1500 to 1636. The chronicle is divided into two parts: the first part, containing events up to and including the year 1598, is a summary of the news from the Chronicle of Marcin Bielski; and the second part, covering the period from 1599 to 1636. In the first part, the chronicler of Ostroh followed Bielski's lead, copying certain parts of his Chronicle verbatim from Polish into Ruthenian. In the second part, the author, along with general historical events, which he covers more extensively than in the first part, systematically notes local economic, social, meteorological and other phenomena. In this part of the chronicle, the author pays much attention to news concerning social relations between different segments of the population. He is particularly interested in issues related to the Orthodox struggle against the Union of Brest (1596). He also pays attention to individuals from the princely Ostrogski family.

== Critical editions ==
- Tikhomirov, Mikhail (1951). Малоизвестные летописные памятники. 4. Острожский летописец [Little-known Annalistic Monuments. 4. The Ostroh Chronicler]. Historical Archive. Volume VII. (in Russian). Moscow: Nauka. pp. 236–253.
- Bevzo, Oleksandr A. (1971). Львівський літопис і Острозький літописець: Джерелознавче дослідження [The Lviv Chronicle and the Ostroh Chronicler: A Source Study] (in Ukrainian). Kyiv: Naukova Dumka. pp. 125–140.

== Literature ==
- Yuriy A. Mytsyk, Літопис Острозький, Острозький літописець (Ostroh Chronicle, Ostroh Chronicler). Encyclopedia of History of Ukraine. In 10 volumes. Editorial board: Valeriy Smoliy (head) and others. Institute of History of Ukraine. Kyiv: Naukova Dumka, 2009. Volume 6: Ла — Мі. pp. 790. ISBN 966-00-0632-2.
- Yuriy A. Mytsyk, Острозький літописець. Острозька давнина (The Ostroh Chronicler. Ostroh Antiquities). Volume 1. (1995), pp. 69–73. Lviv.
- Галицько-Волинський літопис / відп. за вип. Р. М. Федорів. [The Galician–Volhynian Chronicle, edited by R. M. Fedoriv] (1994), pp. 201–219. Lviv: Chervona Kalyna. (Historical library).
- Острозький літописець (The Ostroh Chronicler). Юридична енциклопедія : In 6 Volumes, edited by Yuriy Serhiyovych Shemshuchenko and others (2002). Kyiv: State Research Institution "Encyclopedia Press". Volume 4 : Н — П. pp. 720. ISBN 966-7492-04-4.
