= Nikon Chronicle =

16th-century Russian chronicle

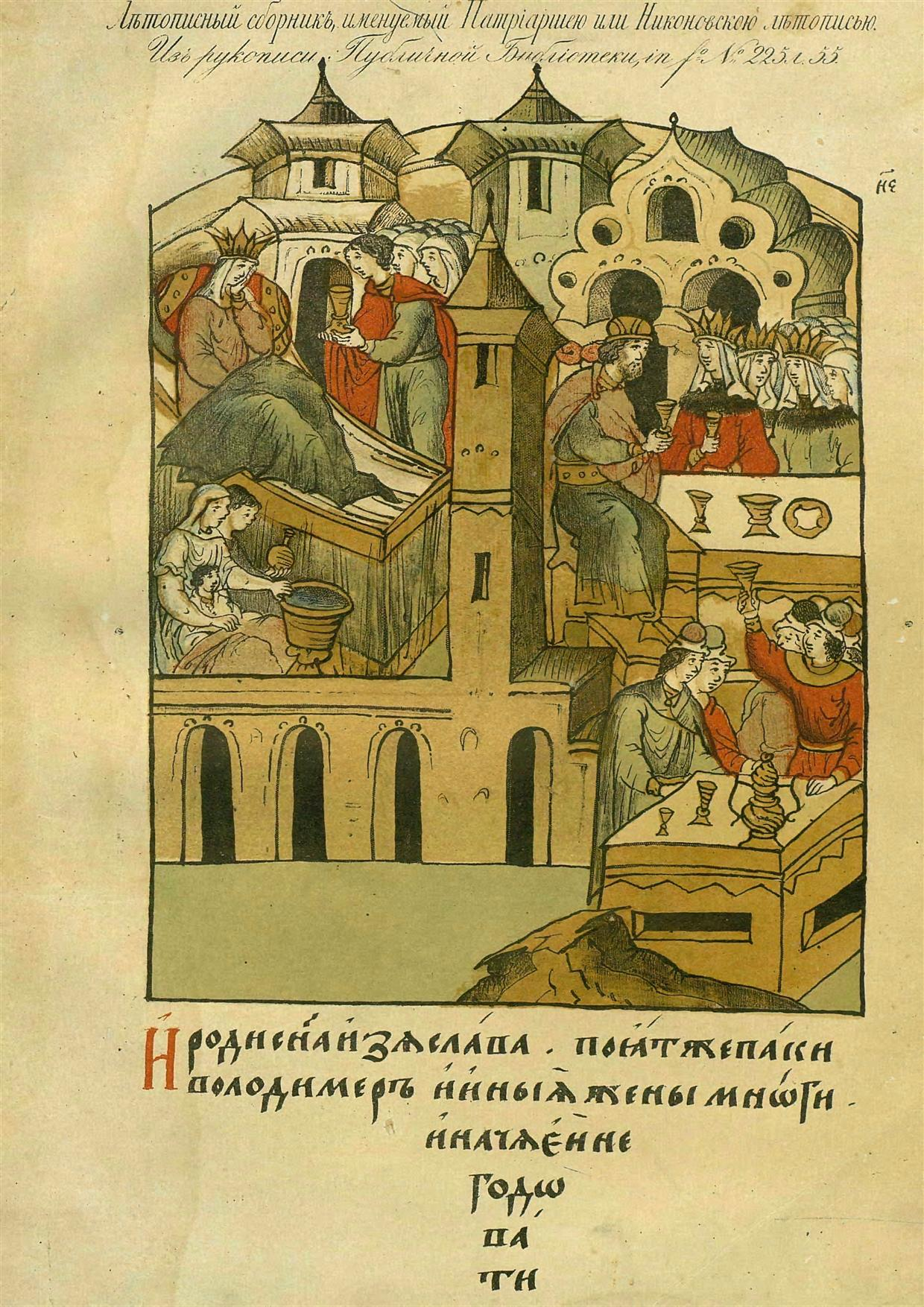
Miniature from the Nikon Chronicle

The Nikon Chronicle (Russian: Никоновская летопись, romanized: Nikonovskaia letopis') is considered the longest chronicle to have been written in Eastern Europe. This vast compilation of earlier Rus' chronicles (with the addition of new material) was created in the late 1520s at the behest of Metropolitan Daniel and was revised in the late 1550s. The compilation was named after Patriarch Nikon of Moscow, who owned a copy. It was the main source for the Illustrated Chronicle of Ivan the Terrible.

== Content and reliability ==
The chronicle covers the years from 859 to 1520, including many detailed "tales" about the most important events, such as The Tale of the Battle of the Neva, The Tale of the Battle of the Ice, The Tale of the Invasion of Tokhtamysh, and The Tale of the Death of Mikhail of Tver. Some of these tales have obvious parallels with Russian folklore and Orthodox hagiography. The chronicle was revised at the court of Ivan IV so as to incorporate additional information for 1521–1558.

As regards the coverage of Kievan Rus, the Nikon Chronicle contains a large number of claims not found in earlier sources: e.g., legends about the sending of metropolitans from Constantinople to pagan Kiev, the papal diplomatic missions to Rus, the bogatyrs of Vladimir's reign (and later periods), and the struggles of the earliest bishops against heretics. Later historians have been particularly drawn to the chronicle's fanciful reports (absent from previous records) about the uprising of Vadim the Bold and other events set in the 860s (the so-called "Chronicle of Askold").

At least some of those interpolations are thought to reflect a political ideology of the nascent Tsardom of Russia. For example, the chronicler calls the Polovtsians of the 12th century “Tatars,” because at the time the chronicle was written the main enemies were the Kazan Tatars, and it was deemed appropriate to highlight the age-old nature of this struggle.

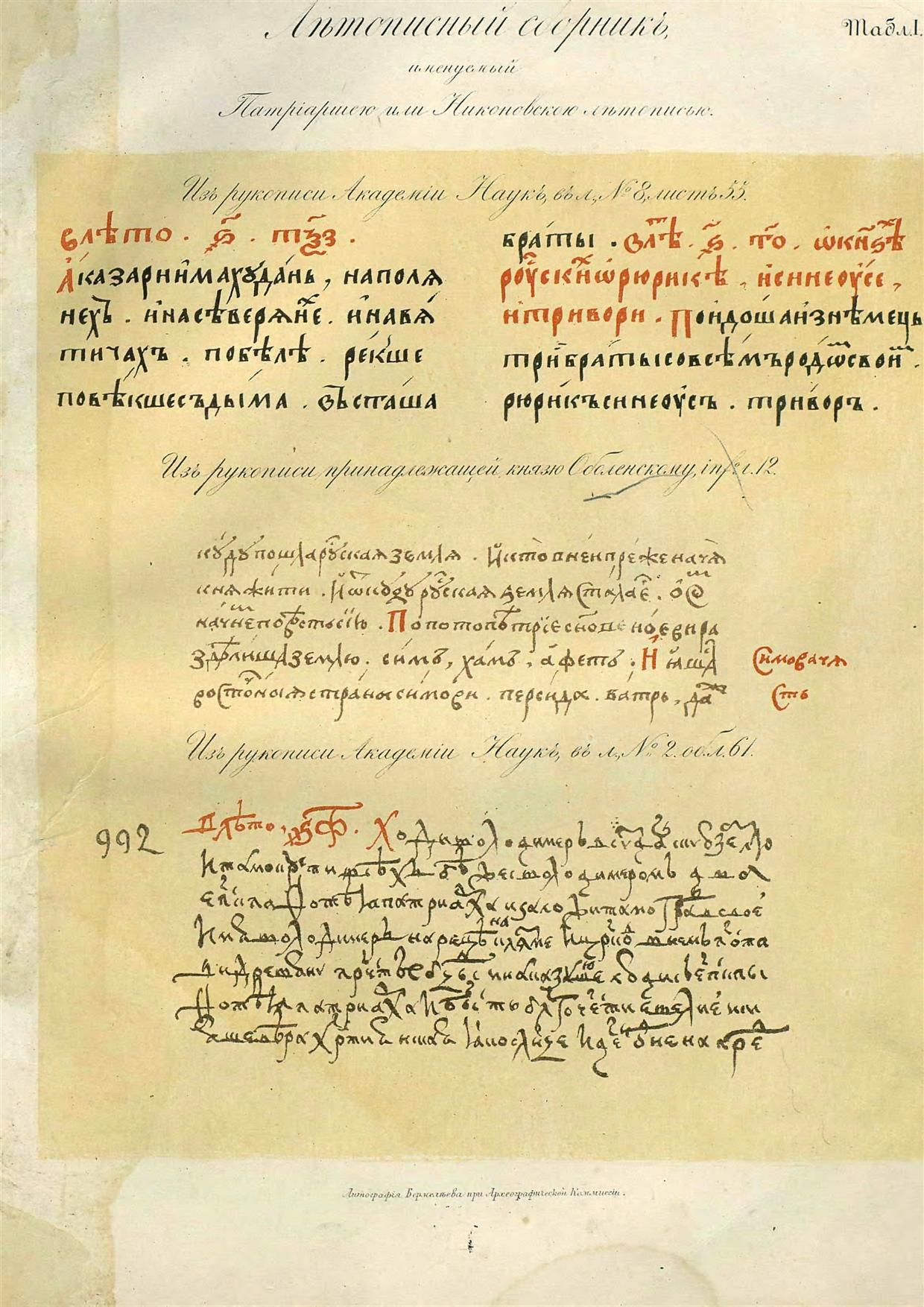
A page from the Nikon Chronicle

While Karamzin doubted the historical accuracy of the chronicle’s additional material on the pre-Mongol period, many 18th- and 19th-century historians believed it might still contain faint echoes of real events from now-lost sources, and thus incorporated it into their works. Over time, confidence in these traces has largely waned, though it’s rarely possible to prove definitively that a story in the Nikon Chronicle is entirely fictional.

The chronicle incorporates several excerpts from Byzantine chronicles (often with muddled chronology). It also includes notes on events and rulers of Bulgaria and Serbia.

== Copies and translations ==
Boris Kloss identifies six main copies of the chronicle. The most valuable of these is named after Prince Mikhail Obolensky (1806—1873), the director of the Moscow archives. The Academic copy is preserved in the Library of the Russian Academy of Sciences, with registration number "32.14.8". The Library acquired it in 1741 from the personal collection of Archbishop Theophan Prokopovich. In the 18th century, the compilation was published under the name The Russian Chronicle According to Nikon's Manuscript.

An English translation by Serge Zenkovsky and his wife Betty Jean Zenkovsky was published in five volumes in the 1980s. It was faulted by academic reviewers for omitting some material and adding material from other chronicles.

== Bibliography ==
=== Publications ===
- Руская летопись по Никонову списку. / Изданная под смотрением имп. Академии наук. СПб, 1767–1792. (Russian Chronicle According to Nikon's Copy. Published under the supervision of the Russian Academy of Sciences, St. Petersburg, 1767–1792) Ч.1, Ч.2, Ч.3, Ч.4, Ч.5, Ч.6, Ч.7, Ч.8
- The Complete Collection of Russian Chronicles, vols. IX-XIV, editions of 1863, 1918, 2000

=== Literature ===
- Maiorov, Alexander V. (November 2018). ""I Would Sacrifice Myself for my Academy and its Glory!" August Ludwig von Schlözer and the Discovery of the Hypatian Chronicle". Russian History. 45 (4). Brill: 319–340.
