= Sofia Second Chronicle =

16th-century Russian chronicle

The Sofia Second Chronicle (Russian: Софийская вторая летопись, romanized: Sofiyskaya vtorarya letopis) is a Russian chronicle from the 16th century. It is found in two redactions: The Archival redaction, from the first quarter of the 16th century, and now in the Russian State Archive of Ancient Documents (RGADA) (Fond 181, No. 371); and the Voskresensky ('Resurrection') redaction, from the middle of the 16th century, now housed in the State Historical Museum (GIM) on the north end of Red Square (Voskresenskoye Sobraniye, bumazhnoye, No. 154). It was first published at the beginning of the 19th century and is included in the Complete Collection of Russian Chronicles (PSRL, vol. 6; St. Petersburg, 1851).

The Sofia Second Chronicle is thought to have derived from the Lvov Chronicle with which it shares many similarities.

== See also ==
- Sofia First Chronicle
