= Complete Collection of Russian Chronicles =

Ongoing publications of medieval texts

Complete Collection of Russian / Rus' Chronicles
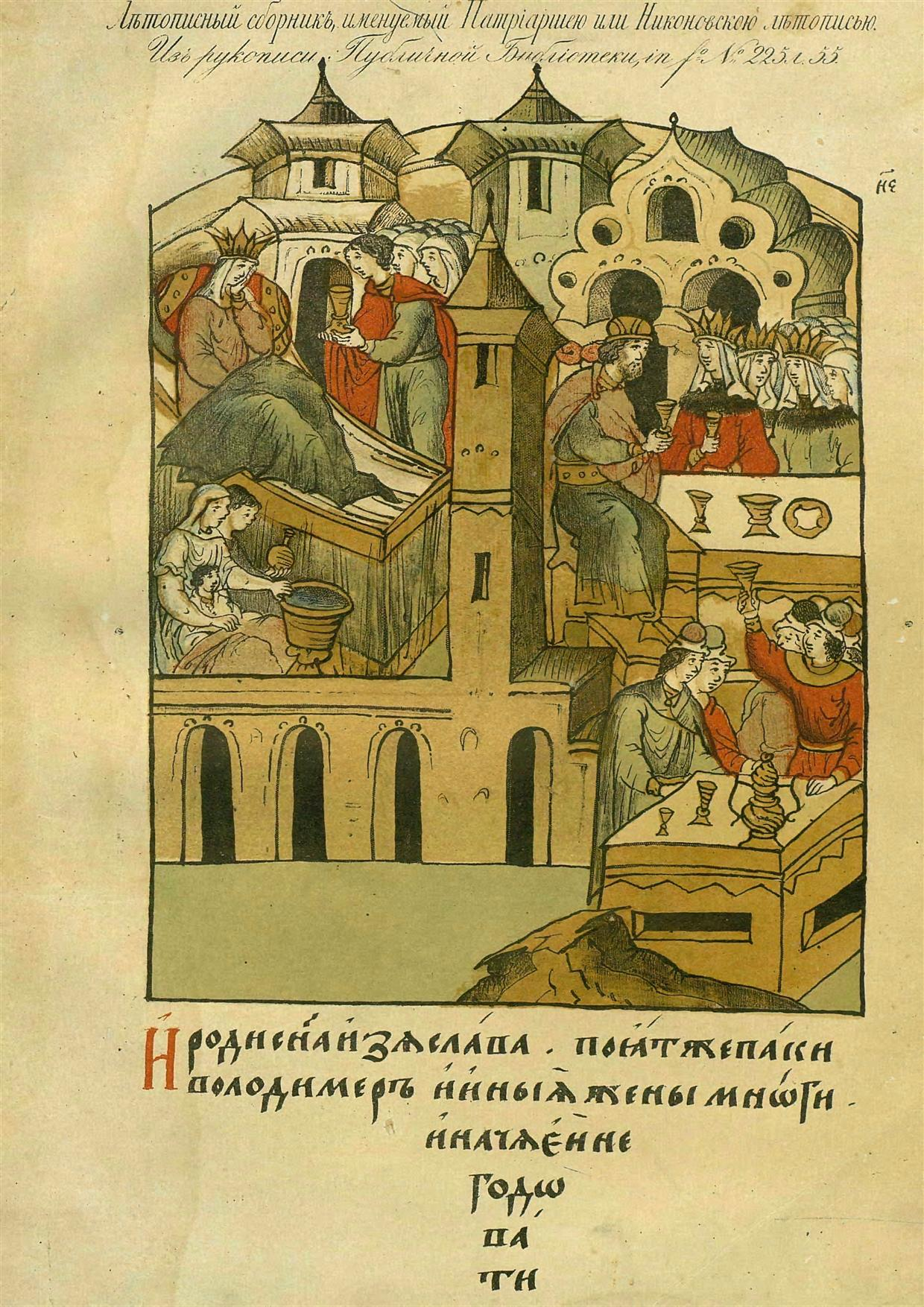
- Author: Archaeographic Commission
- Original title: Полное собрание русских летописей
- Country: Russian Empire; Soviet Union; Russian Federation
- Language: Old Church Slavonic, Old East Slavic, Ruthenian, Russian (rarely: Polish and Latin)
- Genre: textual criticism of Rus' chronicles
- Publisher: Typographies of Edward Prats, Skorokhodov, and Aleksandrov; Nauka & USSR Academy of Sciences Publishing House
- Published: 1841 –
- No. of books: 46 volumes

The Complete Collection of Russian Chronicles or Complete Collection of Rus' Chronicles (Russian: Полное собрание русских летописей, romanized: Polnoe sobranie russkikh letopisei, abbreviated PSRL) is a series of critical editions of all medieval and early modern Rus' chronicles, published for the purpose of textual criticism (also known as "textology"). Dozens of volumes have been published in Imperial Russia, the Soviet Union, and the Russian Federation. The project is ongoing and far from finished.

== Development ==
The chronicles were assembled by the Archaeographic Expedition of the Russian Academy of Sciences (starting in 1828). They were prepared for publication by the Archaeographic Commission, established in 1834 as part of the Ministry of National Enlightenment. The first volumes were published by a publisher "Typography of Edward Prats". The commission was charged to publish the collection on 18 February 1837.

The first ten volumes appeared between 1841 and 1863. New volumes have been brought forth piecemeal throughout the 20th and early 21st centuries. Some of the older volumes have also been reprinted, especially after 1997. The PSRL has set the standard for modern critical editions of Rus' chronicles.

In 1977, Ludolf Müller discovered that thousands of textual variants in the Radziwiłł Chronicle and Academic Chronicle were not reported, or reported incorrectly, in Volume 1 of the PSRL.

== List of published volumes ==
Abbreviations

- "М." = Moscow
- "СПБ (SPB)" = Saint Petersburg
- "Л.(L.)" = Leningrad
- "Т. (Tom)" = Volume

=== Typography of Edward Prats ===
- Volume 1. Laurentian Codex and Trinity Chronicle. Saint Petersburg, 1846
- Volume 2. Hypatian Codex. Saint Petersburg, 1843 (included also Hustyn Chronicle)
- Volume 3. Novgorod First Chronicle. Saint Petersburg, 1841
- Volume 4. Chronicles of Novgorod and Pskov. Saint Petersburg, 1848
- Volume 5. Chronicles of Pskov and Sophia. Saint Petersburg, 1851
- Volume 6. Sofia Chronicle. Saint Petersburg, 1853
- Volume 7. Chronicle of Resurrection List. Saint Petersburg, 1856
- Volume 8. Continuation of the Resurrection List Chronicle. Saint Petersburg, 1859
- Volume 9. Chronicles collection named as Patriarchal or Nikon Chronicle. Saint Petersburg, 1862
- Volume 15. Saint Petersburg, 1863
- Volume 16. Chronicle of Avraamka / Vilnius Manuscript. Saint Petersburg, 1889
- Number of indices (1868–1907)

In 1871–72 the first two volumes were republished as the second editions.

=== Typography of Skorokhodov and Typography of Aleksandrov ===
- Shakhmatov, Aleksey Aleksandrovich; Ptaszycki, Stanisław, eds. (1907). Zapadnorusskie letopisi Западнорусские летописи [Western Rus' Chronicles] (PDF). Complete Collection of Rus' Chronicles (PSRL) (in Belarusian, Russian, and Ukrainian). Vol. 17. Saint Petersburg: Typography of Aleksandrov. (in Volume 32 and 35 rebranded Belarusian-Lithuanian Chronicles).
- Shakhmatov, Aleksey Aleksandrovich, ed. (1908). Ipat'evskaya letopis' Ипатьевская лѣтопись [The Hypatian Codex]. Complete Collection of Rus' Chronicles (PSRL) (in Church Slavic). Vol. 2 (3rd ed.). Saint Petersburg: Typography of M. A. Aleksandrov / Izbornyk.

=== Nauka & USSR Academy of Sciences Publishing House ===
- Лаврентьевская летопись [Laurentian Chronicle]. Полное Собрание Русских Литописей [Complete Collection of Russian chronicles]. Vol. 1. Leningrad: Academy of Science (SSSR). 1926–1928.
- Izbornyk (1950). "Новгородская Первая Летопись Старшего Извода (синодальный Список)" [Novgorod First Chronicle of the Older Edition (Synodal Scroll).]. Izbornyk (in Church Slavic). Moscow / Leningrad: Academy of Sciences of the USSR.
- Nasonov, A. N. (1955). Полное собрание русских летописей. Том 5. Выпуск 2. Псковские летописи [Complete Collection of Rus' Chronicles. Volume 5. Issue 2. Pskov Chronicles] (in Russian). Moscow, Leningrad: USSR Academy of Sciences Publishing House. p. 365. (Nasonov published his first edition of the First Chronicle in 1941. 2013 reprint as ISBN 978-5-457-50387-8).
- Volume 32. Belarusian-Lithuanian Chronicles. Leningrad, 1975. Mikałaj Ułaščyk (ed.).
- Volume 35. Belarusian-Lithuanian Chronicles. Leningrad, 1980. Mikałaj Ułaščyk (ed.).
- Volume 41 : Летописец Переяславля Суздальского (Летописец русских царей) / Сост. С. Н. Кистерев, Б. М. Клосс (Boris Kloss), Л. А. Тимошина, И. А. Тихонюк. М. : Археографический центр, 1995. — 184 с. Полное собрание русских летописей. Електронна бібліотека. (Chronicler of Pereyaslavl-Suzdal, LPS).
- Volume 46. 2018.

== Bibliography ==
- Kloss, Boris (2007). "Copies of the Hypatian Chronicle and Their Textology". Harvard Ukrainian Studies. 29 (1). Translated by DiMauro, Giorgio. Harvard Ukrainian Research Institute: 129–147. JSTOR 41304504.
- Ostrowski, Donald (March 1981). "Textual Criticism and the Povest' vremennykh let: Some Theoretical Considerations". Harvard Ukrainian Studies. 5 (1). Harvard Ukrainian Research Institute: 11–31. JSTOR 41035890.
