= Aleksey Shakhmatov =

Russian philologist (1864–1920)

- Алексей Шахматов
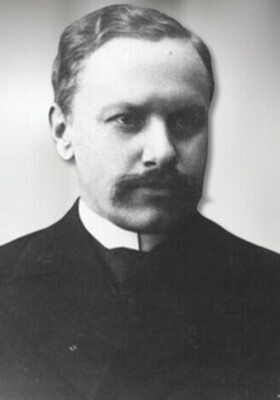
- Born: 17 June [O.S. 5 June] 1864; Narva, Russian Empire (now Estonia)
- Died: 16 August 1920 (aged 56); Petrograd, Russian SFSR (now St. Petersburg, Russia)
- Resting place: Volkovo Cemetery
- Spouse: Natalya Gradovskaya
- Children: 4
- Father: Alexander Shakhmatov
- Relatives: Aleksey Shakhmatov (paternal grandfather); Fyodor von Kohsen (maternal grandfather); Wilhelm von Bistram (maternal great-grandfather)

Academic background
- Education: Moscow State University
- Thesis: Исследования в области русской фонетики ('Studies in the Sphere of Russian Phonetics', 1894)
- Doctoral advisor: Filipp Fortunatov

Aleksey Aleksandrovich Shakhmatov (Russian: Алексе́й Алекса́ндрович Ша́хматов, 17 June [O.S. 5 June] 1864 – 16 August 1920) was a Russian philologist and historian credited with laying the foundations for the science of textology. Shakhmatov held the title of Doctor of Russian language and philology (since 1894). He was a full member of the Russian Academy of Sciences (before 1917 the Saint Petersburg Academy of Sciences) since 1899 and a chair of the Department of Russian language and philology of the Academy of Sciences (1908–1920), a member of the Constitutional Democratic Party (1905) and the Russian Empire State Council (1906–1911).

== Biography ==
Born in Narva (modern-day Estonia) to the Russian noble Shakhmatov family, Shakhmatov was brought up by his uncle near Saratov. His mother was Marie von Kohsen of German origin. He went to a public school in Moscow and developed interest for Old East Slavic language and literature at an early age. At the age of 16, his articles started to appear in the most authoritative journal of Slavic studies of that time, the Archiv für slavische Philologie (Archive of Slavic Philology).

Shakhmatov furthered his education at the Imperial Moscow University (1883–1887), later delivering lectures in the same institution. His first monograph, published in 1886, examined the language of ancient Novgorod charters. In 1891 he became so enthusiastic about zemstvo that he gave up his scholarly pursuits for three years and held a minor administrative office in his native village.

In 1894, Shakhmatov returned to Moscow and won great acclaim for his PhD dissertation, entitled Studies in the Sphere of Russian Phonetics. Five years later, he was admitted to the Russian Academy of Sciences, and over the following years became one of the most reputable academicians. He revived the Academy's linguistic periodicals, edited the academic dictionary of Russian language and was elected to represent the Academy at the State Council of Imperial Russia and Imperial State Duma.

In 1909, Shakhmatov moved to work at Saint Petersburg University as a professor. By that time, he had been elected doctor honoris causa by the Charles University, Berlin University, Polish Academy of Sciences, and many other scholarly societies.

=== 1917 Revolution ===
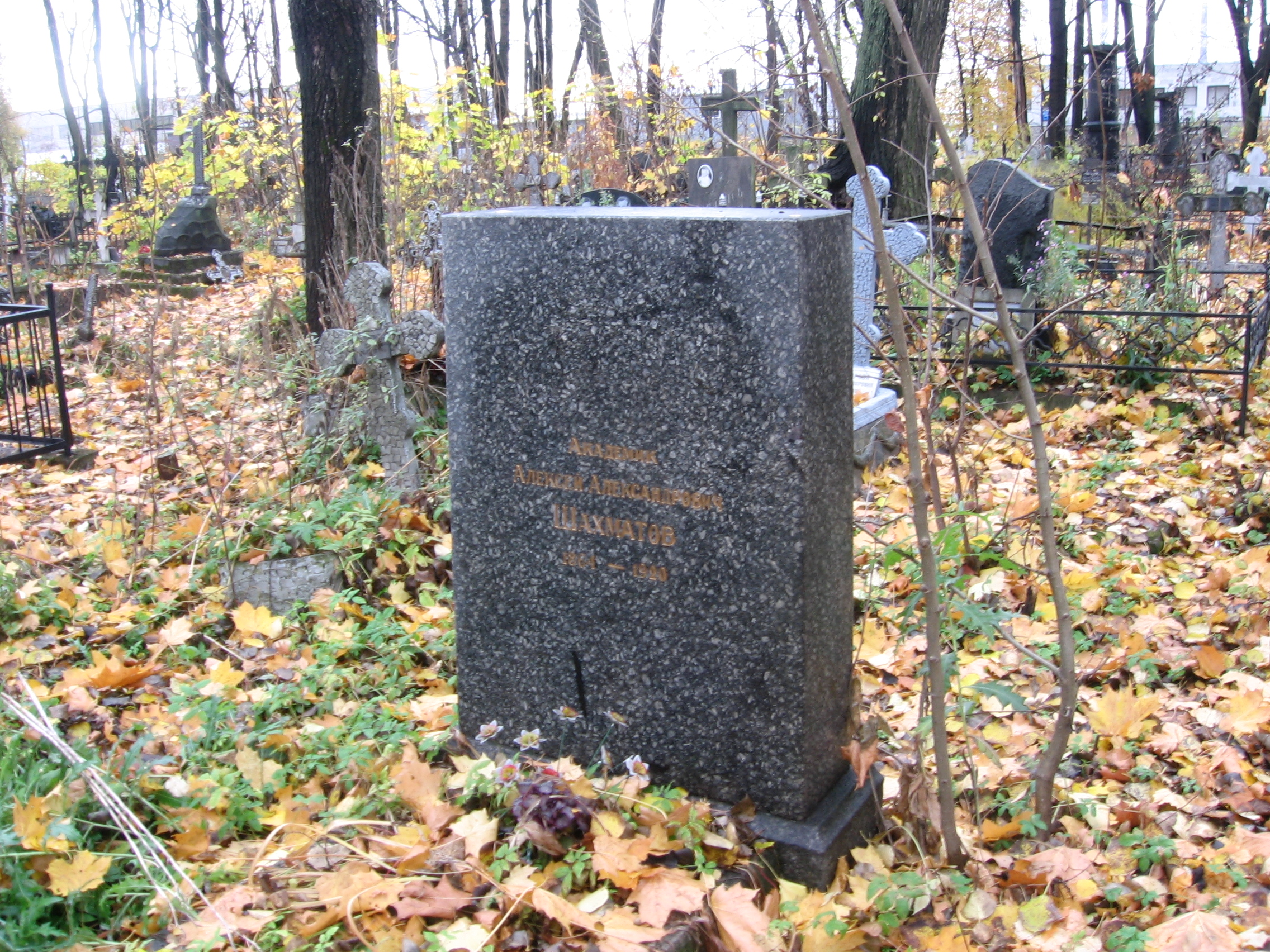
Shakhmatov's grave in Volkovo Cemetery, Saint Petersburg

Shakhmatov participated in the Commission for the Study of the Tribal Composition of the Population of the Borderlands of Russia set up in February 1917. He also helped prepare sweeping reforms of Russian orthography, which were implemented by the Bolsheviks in 1918; this orthography has largely remained unchanged into the 21st century. Shakhmatov refused to leave Petrograd for the West, a fatal decision that led to his premature death from malnutrition and exhaustion in 1920. The Academy subsequently cherished his memory and instituted a special Shakhmatov Prize, to be awarded "for the best works in source science, textology and linguistics".

== Works ==
Shakhmatov is an author of several works in phonetics, dialectology, lexicography, syntax, history of East Slavic languages, modern Russian literary language, history of East Slavic people, history of Old Rus' literature, and Slavic accentology. In his monographies "Research in a field of the Russian phonetics" (Исследования в области русской фонетики, 1894), "To the history of sounds in the Russian language" (К истории звуков русского языка, 1903), and others, Shakhmatov set a goal to restore the all-Russian pronunciation in all of its phonetical details by way of juxtaposition of old and modern eastern Slavic dialects with involving of data from other Slavic languages.

Shakhmatov is best remembered for having pioneered textological research of early Rus' chronicles, notably the Primary Chronicle (PVL) and the Novgorod First Chronicle (NPL). He sought to establish, with a great degree of precision, the stages of evolution of that key text, even attempting to reconstruct the postulated protograph of the PVL and the NPL, what he termed the Nachal'nyj svod (Начальный свод). His research proved seminal for subsequent generations of historians. It was not until the early 21st century that several scholarly publications challenged the core parts of Shakhmatov's views, which had until then been widely accepted.

Shakhmatov was also responsible for publication and pioneering studies of minor or derelict Slavic languages. His studies of Slavic etymology revolved around the idea of close contacts and influences between the ancient Slavs and Celts, a hypothesis that was subsequently discarded. In particular, Shakhmatov was convinced that Prekmurje Slovene, spoken in Prekmurje and the Slovene March, contains Celtic elements due to its front rounded vowels ü and ö. In fact, Prekmurje Slovene is simply a dialect of Slovene, and the sounds ü and ö are common in other dialects of Slovene, such as in Prlekija and some parts of Carinthia. Hungarian nationalists employed this theory of Shakhmatov against the Slovenes as part of magyarization of the Slovene March.

== See also ==
- Shakhmatov Prize
- Textual criticism of the Primary Chronicle (PVL)
