= The History of the Zaporizhian Cossacks (Myshetsky) =

- История о казаках запорожских
- Author(s): Semen Ivanovych Myshetsky
- Language: Church Slavonic
- Date: c. 1740s
- Manuscript(s): 7 manuscripts
- Genre: Cossack histories
- Period covered: Origin myth of the Cossacks; brief overview from Stephen Báthory (1572) to 1709; focus on 1709–1734 in the Kamianka Sich and Oleshky Sich

The History of the Zaporizhian Cossacks (Note: Ukrainian: Історія про козаків запорозьких, romanized: Istoriya pro kozakiv zaporozjkikh. Full original title: Church Slavonic: История о козаках запорожских, как они издревле зачалися и откуда происхождение свое имеют и в каком состоянии ныне находятся, romanized: Istoriya o kozakakh zaporozhskikh, kak oni izdrevle zachaslisja i otkuda proiskhozhdenie svoe imeyut i v kakom sostojanii nyne nakhodjatsja, lit. 'The History of the Zaporizhian Cossacks: How They Came into Being in Ancient Times, Where They Originated, and What Their Current Situation Is'.) is a notable source from the 18th century describing the Sich and the Zaporizhian Cossacks. It contains topographical coordinates and historical facts about the Sich settlements, information about the Zaporizhian huts, and ferry crossings on the Dnipro and Southern Bug rivers. It also covers issues relating to military tactics, the economic and political system, daily life and the customs of the Cossacks.

== Author's background ==
Biographical information about the writer Semen Ivanovych Myshetsky (1716–1773) is rather limited. It is known that he was a member of the old, now impoverished aristocratic family of the Myshetsky princes. After completing his studies at the Corps of Engineers, in 1733 he travelled to Ukraine to work on the construction of the Ukrainian defensive line. In 1736, he was sent to the Zaporizhian Sich to build a fortress there, which would become the Nova Sich (or Pidpilna Sich; 1734–1775).

With some interruptions, Semen Myshetskyy remained in Zaporizhia until May 1741. Myshetskyy drew on his impressions from his several years' stay in the Sich as the basis for his History of the Zaporizhian Cossacks, which he ostensibly finished writing in the year 1740.

== History of the work's authorship ==
The name of the work's author was lost for some time. Written in the 1740s, it remained in anonymous manuscript form for a long time. The History was used and entire chapters were appropriated, often without any reference to the author.

This continued until the work was published by Osip Bodyansky in 1847 in Proceedings of the Society for Russian History and Antiquities. However, the publisher himself made a mistake in attributing the authorship of the History to Alexander Rigelman, the author of the well-known Chronicle Narrative of Little Russia, (Note: Church Slavonic: Лѣтописное повѣствованіе о Малой Россіи. Russian: Летописное повествование о Малой России. Ukrainian: Літописна оповідь про Малу Росію.) one of whose chapters is entitled Historical Narrative about the Zaporizhian Cossacks. This section reproduces Myshetsky’s work with minor alterations.

However, a few months after writing this preface, dated 31 January 1847, Bodyansky corrected his mistake, stating that the author of the history he had published was Lieutenant-Engineer Prince Semen Ivanovych Myshetsky, who was stationed at the Sich between 1736 and 1740, where he took part in the construction of military fortifications.

== Manuscripts ==
The text circulated in manuscript form from the 1740s until the editio princeps by Bodyansky in 1847.

Seven manuscripts of Myshetsky's works are currently known:

- Two manuscripts are held in the Manuscript Department of the Library of the Russian Academy of Sciences in Saint Petersburg.
- Three other manuscripts were discovered by Bodyansky amongst the papers of Gerhard Friedrich Müller (1708–1781), a Russian historian of German origin. It was these that Bodyansky used as the basis for his 1847 edition. Their publisher detected no significant differences between them and Müller's manuscripts, so he found it reasonable to regard them as a single variant.
- The final two known manuscripts are the so-called Sakharov manuscript and the manuscript found in the library of Mikhail Semyonovich Vorontsov (governor-general of Novorossiya, 1823–1854), which was published by the Odesa Society of Antiquities in 1852. The Description of the Zaporizhian Sich, written by Vasyl Cherniavsky in 1766, was included as an appendix to the 1852 Odesa edition.

== Description ==
=== Stylistic comparisons with other writings on the Zaporizhian Cossacks ===
Unlike the historical works of the first half of the 18th century (such as the Eyewitness Chronicle, the Hrabianka Chronicle and the Velychko Chronicle) that touched upon Zaporizhia in one way or another, in the works of Myshetsky, Müller, and especially Rigelman and other authors of the second half of the 18th century, there is a subtle absence of the particular pathos and enthusiasm in the treatment of Cossack themes that characterised the earlier writings. In texts of the late 18th century, a tone of contempt for the ‘common folk’ and the ‘wayward people’ is increasingly evident; these are precisely the terms most frequently used to describe the Zaporizhian Host. According to Nataliia Polonska-Vasylenko (1965), Myshetsky, Müller and Rigelman were all exponents of Russian aristocratic ideology, who condemned the Zaporizhian Cossacks as a "backwards" and "disloyal" people.

Rigelman, basing his Chronicle Narrative of Little Russia on the Eyewitness and Hrabianka chronicles and the histories of Myshetsky and Petro Simonovsky, condemned the Ukrainian Cossacks' liberation struggle against Russia, and sought to justify monarchial power and purported patrimonial rights of the Russian tsars on the old lands of Kievan Rus'.

=== Significance ===
The value of Myshetsky’s work lies in the fact that is based on materials that he collected during his stay amongst the Zaporizhian Cossacks from 1736 to 1740/1. He gave, in particular, topographic coordinates and facts from the history of the Zaporizhian Sich, information about the Zaporizhian kurin, transportation on the Dnipro and Southern Buh. The author also raised questions about military tactics, economic structure, political system, life and customs of the Cossacks. Among other things, he recreated in detail the procedure for convening, as well as the procedure for holding Cossack Radas, and drew up a plan of the Nova Sich.

In the 1842 second edition of the romantic novella Taras Bulba, chapter 3, Nikolai Gogol borrowed heavily from Myshetsky's description of how the Zaporizhian Cossacks elected a new commander-in-chief.

== See also ==
- Brief Description of Little Russia (1730s)
- Chernihiv Chronicle (c. 1770), bears close resemblance to the Eyewitness Chronicle
- Description of Ukraine (1651, 1660), by French military engineer Beauplan
- Eyewitness Chronicle (c. 1700)
- History of the Ruthenians (Istoriya Rusiv; c. 1810)
- Hrabianka Chronicle (c. 1710)
- Huklyv Chronicle (written c. 1660–1812)
- Lviv Chronicle (c. 1650)
- Novhorod-Siverskyi Chronicle (1760s)
- Samiilo Velychko Chronicle (c. 1720)

== Bibliography ==
=== Primary sources and critical editions ===
- Semen Ivanovych Myshetsky, The History of the Zaporizhian Cossacks (c. 1740).
  - Myshetsky, Semen Ivanovych (1847). Bodyansky, Osip (ed.). Исторія о козакахъ запорожскихъ, какъ оные изъ древнихъ лЂтъ зачалися, и откуда свое происхожденіе имЂютъ, и въ какомъ состояніи нынЂ находятся [The History of the Zaporizhian Cossacks: How They Came into Being in Ancient Times, Where They Originated, and What Their Current Situation Is] (in Church Slavic). Moscow: Moscow University Press / Izbornyk. (c. 50 pages)
  - Myshetsky, Semen Ivanovych (1852). История о козаках запорожских, как оные издревле зачалися, и откуда свое происхождение имеют, и в каком состоянии ныне находятся [The History of the Zaporizhian Cossacks: How They Came into Being in Ancient Times, Where They Originated, and What Their Current Situation Is] (in Church Slavic). Odesa: Odesa Municipal Printing Works / Izbornyk. p. 92.
- Müller, Gerhard Friedrich (1760). "Von dem Ursprunge der Cosacken" [About the Origin of the Cossacks]. Sammlung Russischer Geschichte. Des vierten Bandes, Erstes u. zweytes Stück [Collection of Russian History. Volume 4, First and Second Part.] (in German). Saint Petersburg: Imperial Academy of Sciences. pp. 365–410.
  - Later translated or referred to in Russian as O nachale і proiskhozhdenii kozakov ["On the beginning and origin of the Zaporizhian Cossacks"].
- Müller, Gerhard Friedrich (1760). "Nachrichten von der Saporogischen Cosacken" [Reports on the Zaporizhian Cossacks]. Sammlung Russischer Geschichte. Des vierten Bandes, Erstes u. zweytes Stück [Collection of Russian History. Volume 4, First and Second Part.] (in German). Saint Petersburg: Imperial Academy of Sciences. pp. 411–472.
  - Later translated or referred to in Russian as Известие о запорожских казаках, Izvestie o zaporozhskikh kazakakh ["Report on the Zaporizhian Cossacks"].
- Alexander Rigelman, Летописное повествование о Малой России и ее народе и козаках вообще, отколь и из какого народа оные происхождение свое имеют (...) [Chronicle Narrative about Little Russia and Its People and the Cossacks in General, from where and from which people they trace their origins (...)] (1787).
  - Osip Bodyansky, Летописное повествование о Малой России [Chronicle Narrative about Little Russia]. Мoscow: Moscow University Press (1847).
  - Sas, Petro Mykhailovych; Shcherbak, V. O., eds. (1994). Літописна оповідь про Малу Росію та її народ і козаків узагалі [Chronicle Narrative about Little Russia and Its People and the Cossacks in General] (in Ukrainian). Kyiv: Lybidj. p. 768.

=== Literature ===
- Sas, Petro Mykhailovych (2009). "Мишецький Семен Іванович" [Semen Ivanovych Myshetsky]. Encyclopedia of History of Ukraine (in Ukrainian). Vol. 6. Kyiv: Institute of History of Ukraine. p. 693–694. Archived from the original on 24 June 2026.
- Sas, Petro Mykhailovych (2012). "Рігельман Олександр Іванович" [Oleksandr Ivanovych Rihelman]. Encyclopedia of History of Ukraine (in Ukrainian). Vol. 9. Kyiv: Institute of History of Ukraine. pp. 217–218. Archived from the original on 27 June 2026.
- Strelsky, H. (1997). "Мишецький Семен Іванович" [Myshetsky Semen Ivanovych]. Малий словник історії України (Small Dictionary of Ukraine's History) (in Ukrainian). Lybidj.
- Bovhyrya, Andriy (2002). "«История о козаках запорожских» Семена Мишецького в історичні думці другої половини XVIII ст" ["The History of the Zaporizhian Cossacks" by Semen Myshetsky in the historical thought of the second half of the 18th century] (PDF). Історіографічні дослідження в Україні / Historiographical studies in Ukraine (1968–2020) (in Ukrainian) (11). Institute of History of Ukraine: 303–317. Archived (PDF) from the original on 26 February 2019.
