= Eyewitness Chronicle =

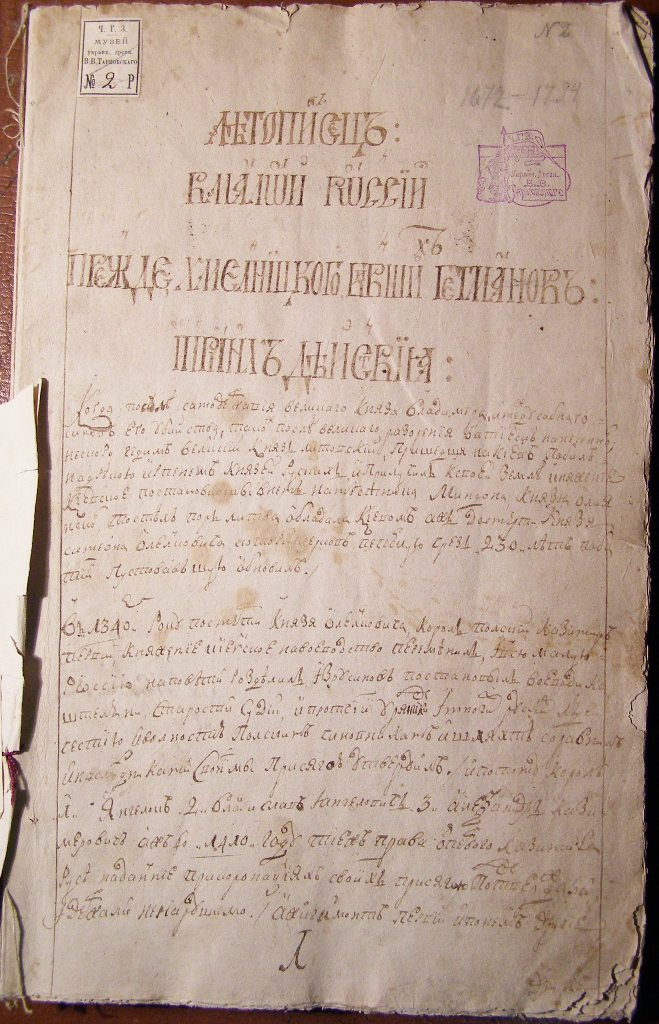
Tarnovsky manuscript of the Eyewitness Chronicle.

Printed edition of the Eyewitness Chronicle (Kyiv: Naukova Dumka, 1971). The publication was prepared by Yaroslav Ivanovych Dzyra, PhD candidate in Philology.

The Eyewitness Chronicle (Note: Ukrainian: Літопис Самовидця, romanized: Litopys Samovydcja.) is one of the three so-called Cossack chronicles written in late Ruthenian (Middle Ukrainian). The text is one of the fundamental sources on the history of Eastern Europe in the 17th century, particularly the period of the Khmelnytsky Uprising and The Ruin in Cossack Ukraine, a distinctive and original monument of the Ukrainian language and literature. The chronicle claims to be written by an eyewitness to the events, a veteran from the Zaporizhian Host's senior officers. According to Frank Sysyn (1990), it is "the earliest extant Ukrainian account of the history of Ukraine in the second half of the seventeenth century."

== Provenance ==
=== Authorship ===
The Eyewitness Chronicle was written in Middle Ukrainian (late Ruthenian), which was close to the vernacular (the prosta mova or "simple speech"). This contrasts the Eyewitness Chronicle and Velychko Chronicle with the Hrabianka Chronicle, which was written in late Church Slavonic, the literary standard in the Tsardom of Russia, far removed from the everyday language spoken by Ukrainians and Belarusians living in the Cossack Hetmanate. The author of the chronicle is not known by name, but he belonged to the Cossack elite and held a prominent position in the Ukrainian government for some time. Researchers have long tried to establish his name. In 1846, the amateur historian D. Serdyukov was the first to attribute the authorship to Roman Rakushka-Romanovsky (c. 1622–1703), general treasurer under Ivan Briukhovetsky, and in the last decades of his life, a priest in Starodub. (Note: Frank Sysyn (1990) commented: "Although the author of the Eyewitness Chronicle remains unknown, no specialist has advanced a clerical rather than a lay candidate as author." Rakushka's later priesthood would thus not speak in favour of attributing the composition to him in his later life.) However, he could not prove it. This became possible after the works of Vadim Modzalevsky on Rakushka-Romanovsky in 1919. In the 1920s, a number of authors (Viktor Romanovsky; Oleksander Ohloblyn and especially Mykola Petrovsky) independently of each other, based on an analysis of autobiographical material in the Chronicle, came to the conclusion that the author of the Eyewitness Chronicle was indeed most likely Roman Rakushka-Romanovsky.

This opinion was accepted by most historians (Dmytro Bahalii, Mykhailo Hrushevsky, Dmytro Doroshenko, Ivan Krypiakevych and others, and in particular modern historiography). But some authors have named other candidates for authorship: Ivan Bykhovets, military clerk (according to Lev Okinshevych), Fedir Kandyba, colonel of Korsun (according to Mykola Hryhorovych Andrusiak and Mykhailo Voznyak), and others. Frank Sysyn noted in 1990: "Time, place, and authorship of composition have remained hotly debated, with Roman Rakushka as the favored candidate for author on the basis of internal evidence. (...) Whether its compiler witnessed the events of Khmel'nyts'kyi's uprising himself and wrote them down later or whether he incorporated an earlier account into his text remains uncertain. In either case, the laconic Eyewitness Chronicle is the only Cossack chronicle still credited with containing some primary information on the Khmel'nyts'kyi period."

=== Manuscript circulation ===
The original Chronicle, written at the end of the 17th or beginning of the 18th century, has not survived. Several copies made in the 18th century or later have been preserved. The oldest and most complete are the manuscripts of H. Iskritsky (first half of the 18th century) and Yakov Kozelsky (second half of the 18th century), which form the basis of scientific publications on this monument. In total, six copies (two of which from the first half of the 18th century, the rest later) were known to the publishers of the 1846 and 1878 editions.

As of 1992, there were 7 known manuscripts, 4 of which were kept in the manuscript department of the Vernadsky National Library of Ukraine, and one each in the manuscript departments of the National Library of Russia in St. Petersburg, the Kharkiv Korolenko State Scientific Library, and the Vasyl Tarnovsky Chernihiv Regional Historical Museum.

=== Publications ===
1846 edition by Osip Bodyansky

For the first time, having received it from Panteleimon Kulish (who gave it the name "Eyewitness Chronicle"), it was published by Osip Bodyansky in 1846 in Readings of the Moscow Society of Antiquities. A more scientifically prepared edition was published in 1878 by the Kyiv Archaeographic Commission, edited and with an introductory article by Orest Levytsky based on Kozelsky's manuscript under the title "Chronicle of an Eyewitness based on newly discovered lists with the addition of three Little Russian chronicles: Khmelnytsky, 'Brief Description of Little Russia' and 'Collections of History'". It was published again by Yaroslav Dzyra at the Institute of History of Ukraine of the National Academy of Sciences of Ukraine in 1971, based on the manuscripts of Iskritsky, Kozelsky and Mykhailo Sudiyenko, and by "Harvard Series in Ukrainian Studies" in 1972.

== Structure ==
The Eyewitness Chronicle consists of an introduction, which describes the state of Ukraine before the Khmelnytsky Uprising, and two main parts:

- The first part is devoted to the times of Khmelnytsky and the Ruin (up to and including 1676). It was probably written much later than the events described.
- The second part, brought up to and including the year 1702, is a chronicle in the strict sense of the word. It was written in Left-Bank Ukraine, and most complete (in terms of local news) in Starodub.

== See also ==
- History of the Ruthenians (Istoriya Rusiv, c. 1810)
- The History of the Zaporizhian Cossacks (1740s), historical work written by Semen Ivanovych Myshetsky
- Samijlo Velychko Chronicle
- Hrabianka Chronicle
- Huklyv Chronicle
- Lviv Chronicle
- Chernihiv Chronicle, bears close resemblance to the Eyewitness Chronicle

== Sources ==
- Sysyn, Frank E. (1990). "The Cossack Chronicles and the Development of Modern Ukrainian Culture and National Identity". Harvard Ukrainian Studies. 14 (3/4). Harvard Ukrainian Research Institute: 593–607. ISSN 0363-5570. JSTOR 41036403.
- Dzyra, Yaroslav Ivanovych (2009). "Літопис Самовидця" [Eyewitness Chronicle]. Encyclopedia of History of Ukraine (in Ukrainian). Vol. 6. Kyiv: Institute of History of Ukraine. p. 790. Archived from the original on 10 February 2026.
- Dzyra, Yaroslav Ivanovych, ed. (1971). Літопис Самовидця [Eyewitness Chronicle]. Kyiv: Naukova Dumka/Izbornyk. p. 208. Archived from the original on 10 February 2026. djvu
- Летопись Самовидца по новооткрытым спискам с приложением трех малороссийских хроник: «Хмельницкой», «Краткого описания Малороссии» и «Собрания исторического» with a foreword by Orest Levytsky. Kyiv, 1878

== Literature ==
- Андрусяк Микола Григорович До питання про авторство Літопису Самовидця. — Львів: Записки Наукового товариства ім. Шевченка, 1928. — Т. CXLIX. — С. 189—194..
- Багалій Д. Нарис української історіографії. — Вип. 2 // Джерелознавство. — К., 1925.
- Бевзенко С. П. Спостереження над синтаксисом українських літописів XVII ст. — Наукові записки Ужгородського державного університету. — Т. IX. — Ужгород, 1954.
- Возняк М. Історія української літератури. — Т. III. — Львів, 1924.
- Возняк Михайло. Хто ж автор т. зв. Літопису Самовидця? — Львів, 1933.
- Гординський Ярослав. « Милость божія», українська драма з 1728 р. — Записки Наукового товариства ім. Шевченка. — Львів, 1925. — Т. CXXXVI — CXXXVII; 1927, Т. CXLVI.
- Грушевский М. С. Самовидец Руины и его позднейшие отражения. — Труды Института славяноведения Академии наук СССР. — Т. I. — Л., 1932.
- Грушевский М. С. Об украинской историографии XVIII века. Несколько соображений. — Известия АН. СССР, VII серия, отд. общественных наук, 1934, № 3.
- Dzyra, Yaroslav Ivanovych. І. Українські літописи XVI — XVIII ст. в радянській історіографії. — Історичні джерела та їх використання. — Вип. III. — К., 1968.
- Дзира Я. І. Джерельна основа праці О. Рігельмана про Україну. — Історіографічні дослідження в Українській РСР. — Вип. II. — К., 1969.
- Житецкий П. Очерк звуковой истории малорусского наречия. — К., 1876.
- Житецкий П. «Энеида» Котляревского и древнейший список ее в связи с обзором малорусской литературы XVIII века. — К., 1900.
- Иконников В. С. Опыт русской историографии. — Т. 2, кн. 1. — К., 1908.
- Історія української літератури у восьми томах. — Т. I. — К., 1967.
- Карпов Г. Критический обзор разработки главных русских источников, до истории Малороссии относящихся, за время: 8-е января 1654 по 30 мая 1672. — М., 1870.
- Карпов Г. Начало исторической деятельности Богдана Хмельницкого. — М., 1873.
- Летопись Самовидца о войнах Богдана Хмельницкого и о междоусобиях, бывших в Малой России по его смерти. Доведена продолжателями до 1734 года. — Чтения в имп. Обществе истории и древностей российских при Московском университете, 1846, № 1, отд. II; 1846, № 2; Окреме вид. — М., 1846. \189\
- Летопись Самовидца по новооткрытым спискам с приложением трех малороссийских хроник: «Хмельницкой», «Краткого описания Малороссии» и «Собрания исторического», з передмовою О. Левицького. — К., 1878.
- Максимович М. А. Собрание сочинений. — Т. І. — К., 1876. — С. 525.
- Марченко Михайло Іванович, Українська історіографія (з давніх часів до середини XIX ст.). — К., 1959.
- Модзалевський В. Перший військовий підскарбій (1663 — 1669). Роман Ракушка-Романовський. — Записки історично-філологічного відділу Української Академії наук. — Кн. 1. — К., 1919. — С. 52; кн. 2, 1920—1922. — С. 29–59.
- Огоновський О. Історія літератури руськой. — Ч. І. — Л., 1887.
- Окиншевич Л. До питання про автора Літопису Самовидця. — Нариси з соціаяьно-економічної історії України. — Т. І. — К., 1932.
- Петличний І. З. Граматичні особливості мови Літопису Самовидця. — Питання українського мовознавства. — Кн. 1. — Львів, 1956.
- Петров Н. И. Очерки из истории украинской литературы XVII и XVIII веков. — К., 1911.
- Петровський М. До питання про певність відомостей літопису Самовидця й про автора літопису (Романа Ракушку-Романовського). — Записи Ніжинського інституту народної освіти. — Кн. VI. — Ніжин, 1926.
- Петровський М. Нариси історії України XVII — початку XVIII ст. (Досліди над Літописом Самовидця). — Харків, 1930.
- Письма П. А. Кулиша к О. М. Бодянскому (1846—1848) // Русский архив. — 1892, № 11.
- Письма П. А. Кулиша к О. М. Бодянскому (1846—1877) // Киевская старина. — 1897, сентябрь, октябрь, ноябрь, декабрь; 1898, февраль.
- Романовський В. Хто був «Самовидець?» — Кн. 5. — Україна, 1925,
- Франко I. Студії над українськими народними піснями. — Записки Наукового товариства ім. Шевченка. — Львів, 1911—1912.
- Франко І. Нарис історії українсько-руської літератури до 1890 р. — Львів, 1910.
- Шевченко Т. Повне зібрання творів. У 6 т. — Т. V, VI. — К., 1964.
