= Samiilo Velychko Chronicle =

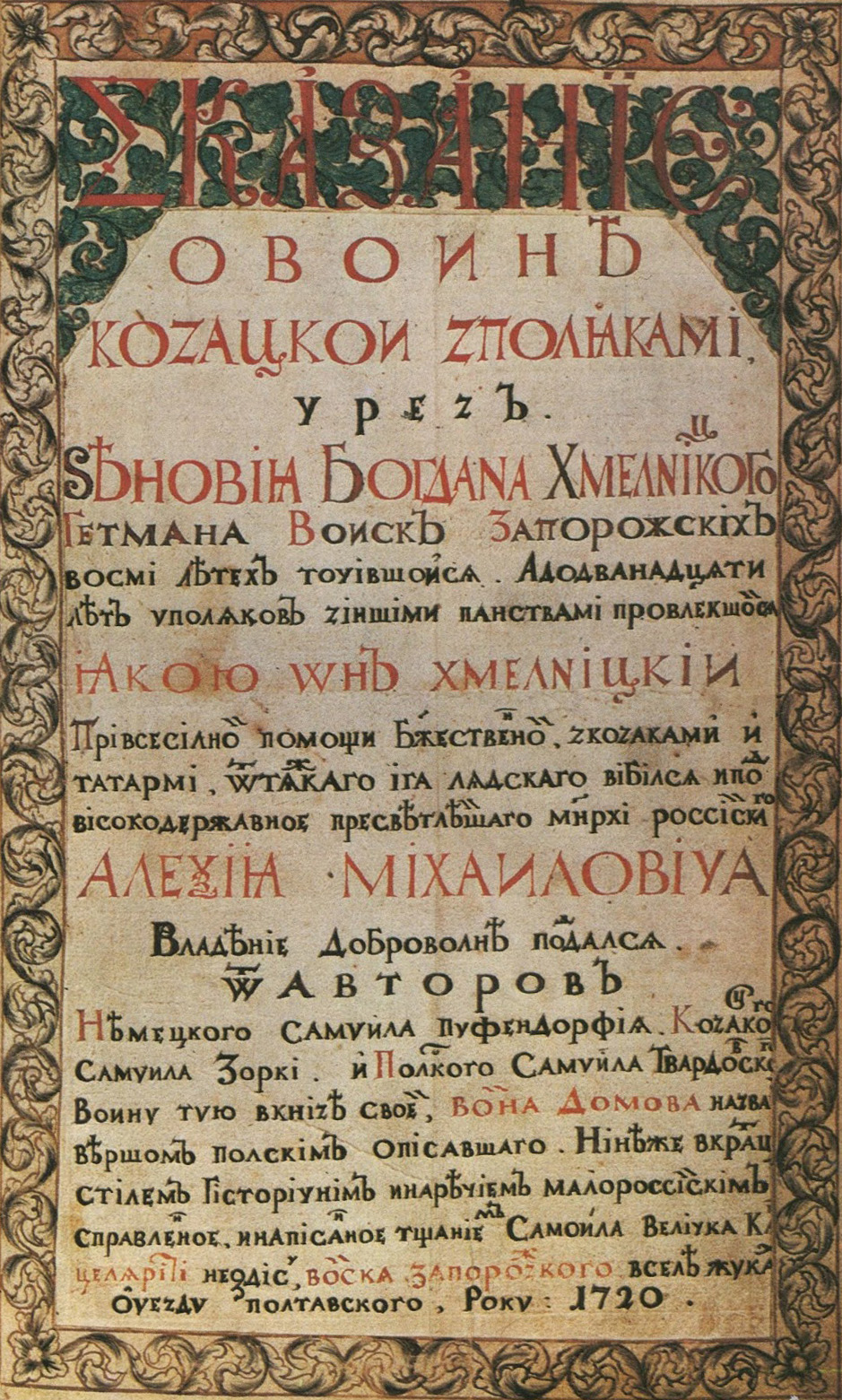
1720 manuscript of the Velychko Chronicle

The Samiilo Velychko Chronicle, (Note: Ukrainian: Літопис Самійла Величка, romanized: Litopys Samijla Velychka.) or simply the Velychko Chronicle, is a Ukrainian Cossack chronicle from the first half of the 18th century, written around 1720 by Cossack clerk Samiilo Velychko. It covers events from 1620 to 1700, and contains documents from the General Military Chancellery, as well as quotations from documents and chronicles that are now lost. Together with the Eyewitness Chronicle, the Hrabianka Chronicle and the History of the Ruthenians (Istoriya Rusiv), it forms a complex of Cossack historiography.

== Contents ==
The chronicle consists of three parts:

- The initial part, the title of which is lost, covering the era of Petro Konashevych-Sahaidachny and other Cossack uprisings that happened before the Khmelnytsky Uprising.
- The "Skazanie", or more fully: "The Tale [Skazanie] of the Cossack War with the Poles through Zinoviy Bohdan Khmelnytsky...", which depicts the events of 1648–1659 (the Khmelnytsky Uprising and the early stage of the Polish–Russian War (1654–1667)), with some episodes dating back to 1620. Describing the war of Yakiv Ostryanyn in 1638, Velychko adds to the authentic source he used, — the diary of the Polish chronicler Szymon Okolski — his own commentary.
  - There is a large gap in the "Skazanie" of the Velychko Chronicle: the end of the first chapter (частина, chastyna), the entire second, third, and fourth chapter, and the first part (розділ rozdil) of the fifth chapter are lost.
- The "Poviestvovanie", entitled "The Narrative [Poviestvovanie] of events in Little Rus' and other places, collected and described here", covering the years 1660–1686 and 1687–1700, contain a significant number of Velychko's own observations and are based on documents from the Hetman's General Military Chancellery.

In addition, there are some appendices from various 17th-century documents.

== Composition ==
Samiilo Velychko began working at the Cossack Hetmanate's General Military Chancellery at the beginning of 1705, where he went on to serve Ivan Mazepa for four full years, most likely at Mazepa's Honcharivka Palace near Baturyn. A codicological analysis of the manuscripts suggests that Velychko began gathering material to write his work during this period. It is unknown whether he was commissioned to write this text, or took the initiative himself. Velychko carefully selected documents from the hetman's archive, or a private archive, bought expensive paper to write on, and penned down the introduction of the Tale ("Skazanie").

Samiilo Velychko did not limit himself to narrow local materials and his own memories when creating his Chronicle, but used a variety of domestic and foreign sources. However, the most reliable sources for Velychko were the diary of the Cossack chronicler Samiilo Zorka, the personal scribe of Hetman Bohdan Khmelnytsky, and minor Cossack chronicles. Velychko's personal library consisted of at least 18 books, which he acquired somewhere between 1690 and 1708; apart from a work on philosophy by Andrea Ladislao Wołodkowicz, most of them were panegyrics written by his best-known contemporaries, including Lazar Baranovych, Stefan Yavorsky, and Pylyp Orlyk.

Based on a watermark analysis, the expensive paper, which Velychko purchased and used to copy the selected documents for his chronicle, was assessed by the a group of Saint Petersburg historians to have been produced by the end of the 17th century. He began copying the documents during his 1705–1708 term at the Chancellery, but his other work there kept him from substantially compiling his text before he was interrupted. However, his introduction of the Tale was completed before the interruption, and he might have drafted the future text at this time.

At the end of 1708, Velychko wrote that a 'misfortune' happened to him, without clarification; this has led scholars to debate what exactly he meant. According to Tatiana Tairova-Yakovleva (2021), after the Russian Sack of Baturyn (2 November 1708, when Velychko's archives were probably captured by Aleksandr Menshikov's troops), Velychko was in Mazepa's camp in Romny in 21–24 November 1708. However, he did not go to Hadiach with the armies of Mazepa and Charles XII of Sweden; not having a horse to escape, he then became a prisoner of war when the Russians captured Romny. In his own words, Velychko wrote at a certain place in his chronicle that "my good life had changed to the life of a prisoner" (Ukrainian: за премененіемъ того-жъ времени доброю житія моего на неволничое). It is most probable that he remained in Russian captivity on the territory of Ukraine until released from imprisonment in 1715.

Shortly after his liberation around 1715, Velychko continued his project at the estate of colonel Vasyl Kochubey in the village of Zhuky (Poltava Raion). On his title page, he stated that he completed the Tale ["Skazanie"], the part covering the era of Bohdan Khmelnytsky, in 1720. The part covering 1660–1700, the Narrative ["Poviestvovanie"], was completed somewhere between 1720 and 1725. Around the same time, Velychko compiled the initial part of the chronicle (the title of which is not known, since the title page has not survived), covering the era of Petro Konashevych-Sahaidachny and other Cossack uprisings that happened before Khmelnytsky. The author says that this initial part was completed in 1725, when he was working in Dykanka. Further additions and corrections were made from 1715 to 1727, including documents, footnotes, numbering the pages and books of the manuscripts, and connecting the parts by inscriptions. The manuscript must have been completed before he lost his sight in about 1728, after which he died at an unknown date.

== Provenance ==
The chronicle itself by Samiilo Velychko has not completely survived in its original form. There is only one original manuscript written by Velychko, and one copy of his work made by someone else, which have been preserved. The first volume is badly damaged, and the second is significantly less so. It is quite likely that the book did not end in 1700, because both the title and many places in the third volume mention events at least until 1720. Therefore, there is a belief that the final pages of the chronicle have also been lost.

== Language ==
Velychko's chronicle is written in the rather complex Middle Ukrainian (late Ruthenian) literary language of the 18th century, with elements of the vernacular (prosta mova), Old Slavonicisms, and Polish and Latin words. The chronicle is one of the most important and reliable works of Ukrainian historiography from the second half of the 17th century to the beginning of the 18th century.

== Drawings ==
The chronicle contains 16 drawings, most of which are images of Ukrainian hetmans, as well as one portrait of tsar Peter I of Russia. Some of the images are unique portraits of historical figures, images of whom have not been preserved, so they became the basis for further illustrations of these people. In particular: Ivan Briukhovetsky (2 portraits, one of which is posthumous), Mykhailo Khanenko, Ivan Vyhovsky, Demian Mnohohrishny, and more.

Some of the portraits

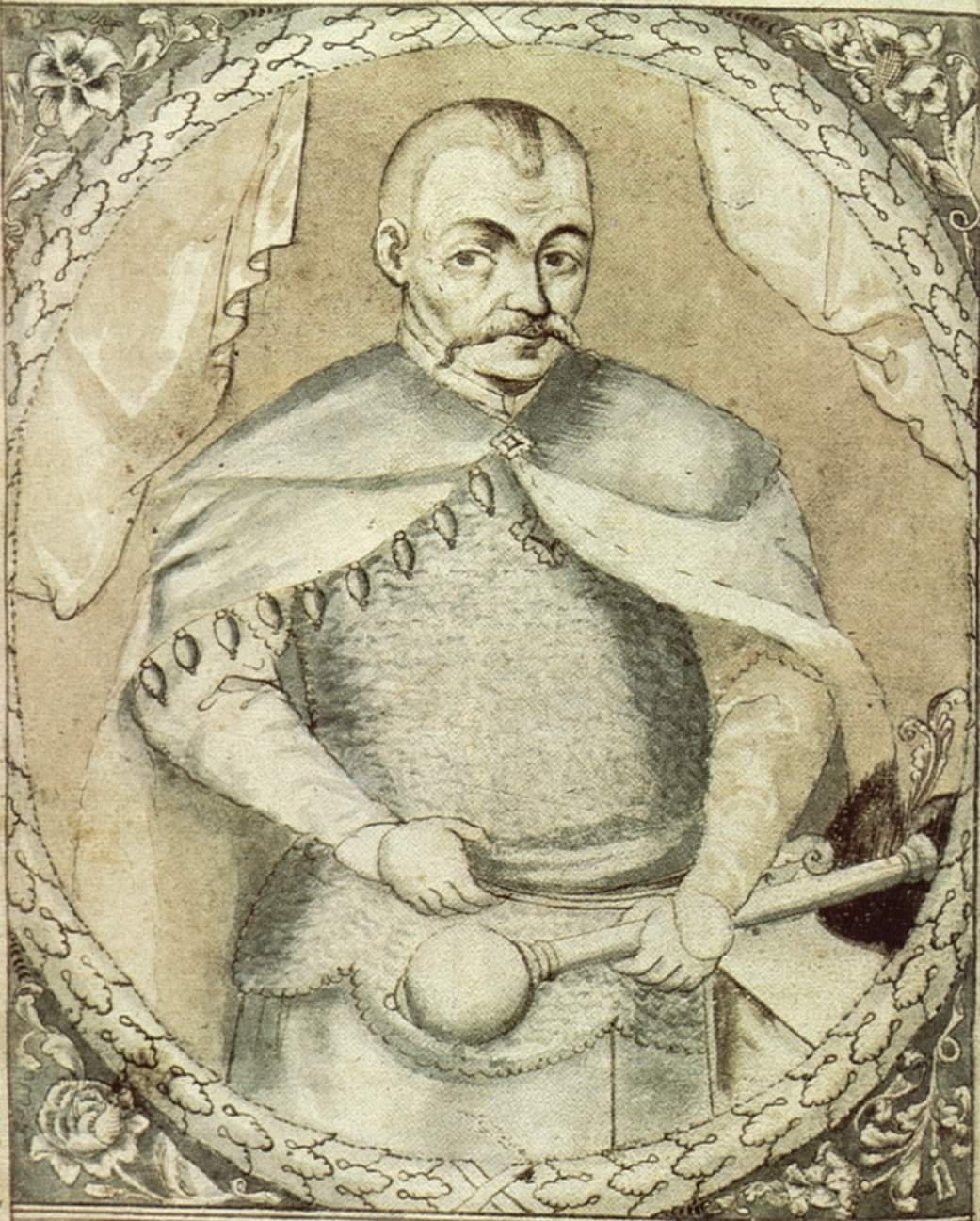
Bohdan Khmelnytsky

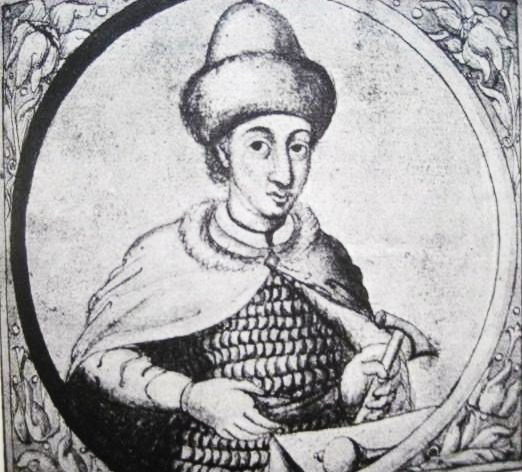
Yuri Khmelnytsky

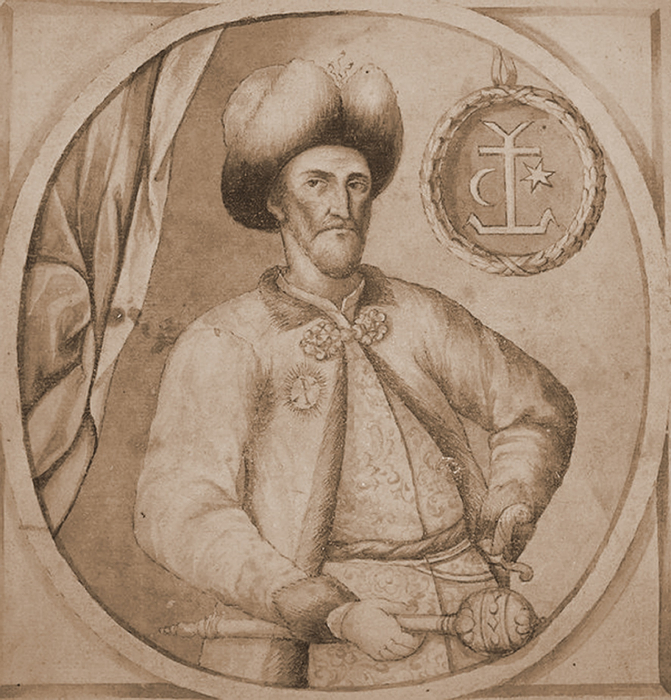
Ivan Mazepa

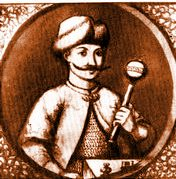
Ivan Vyhovsky

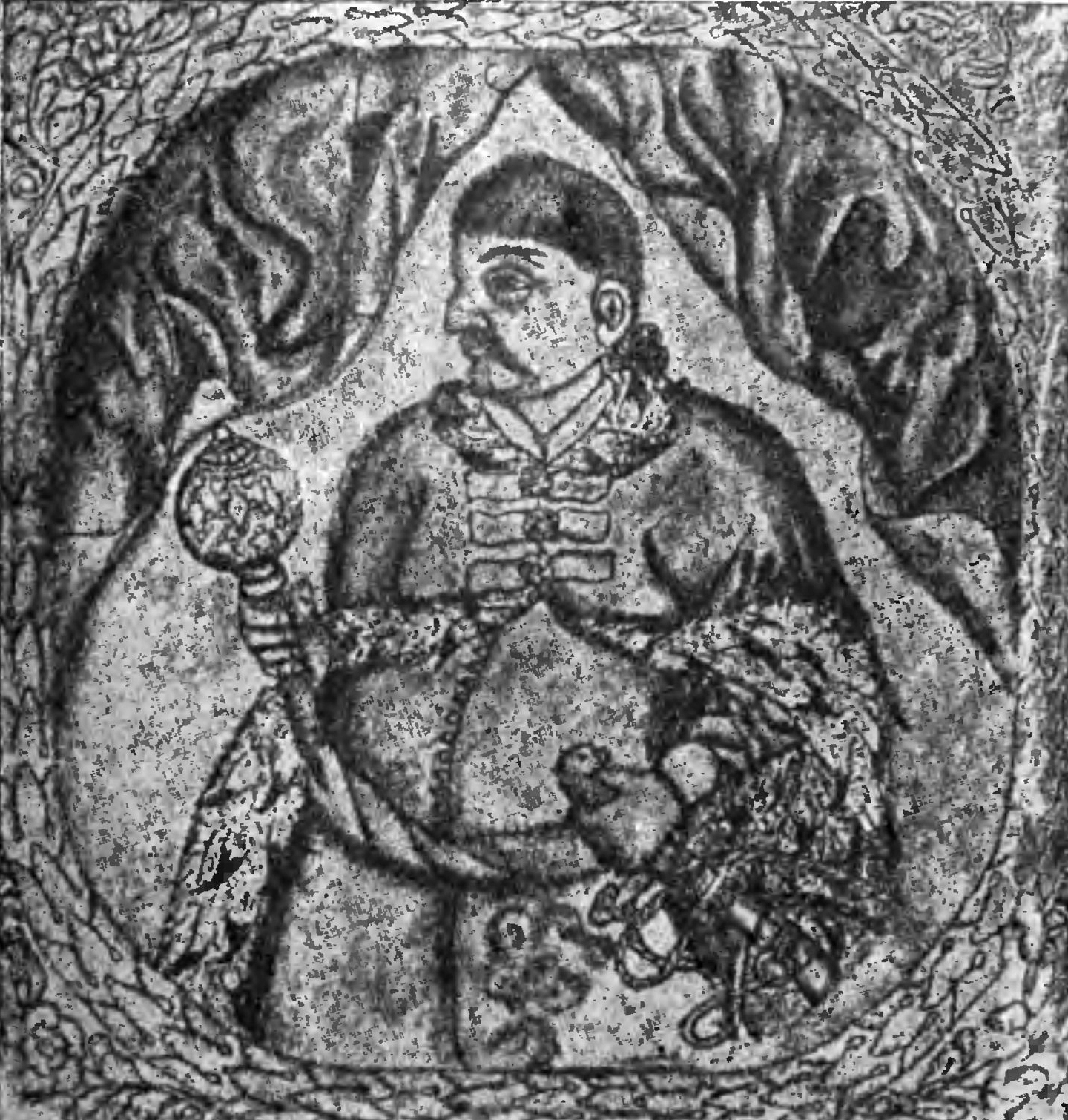
Petro Doroshenko

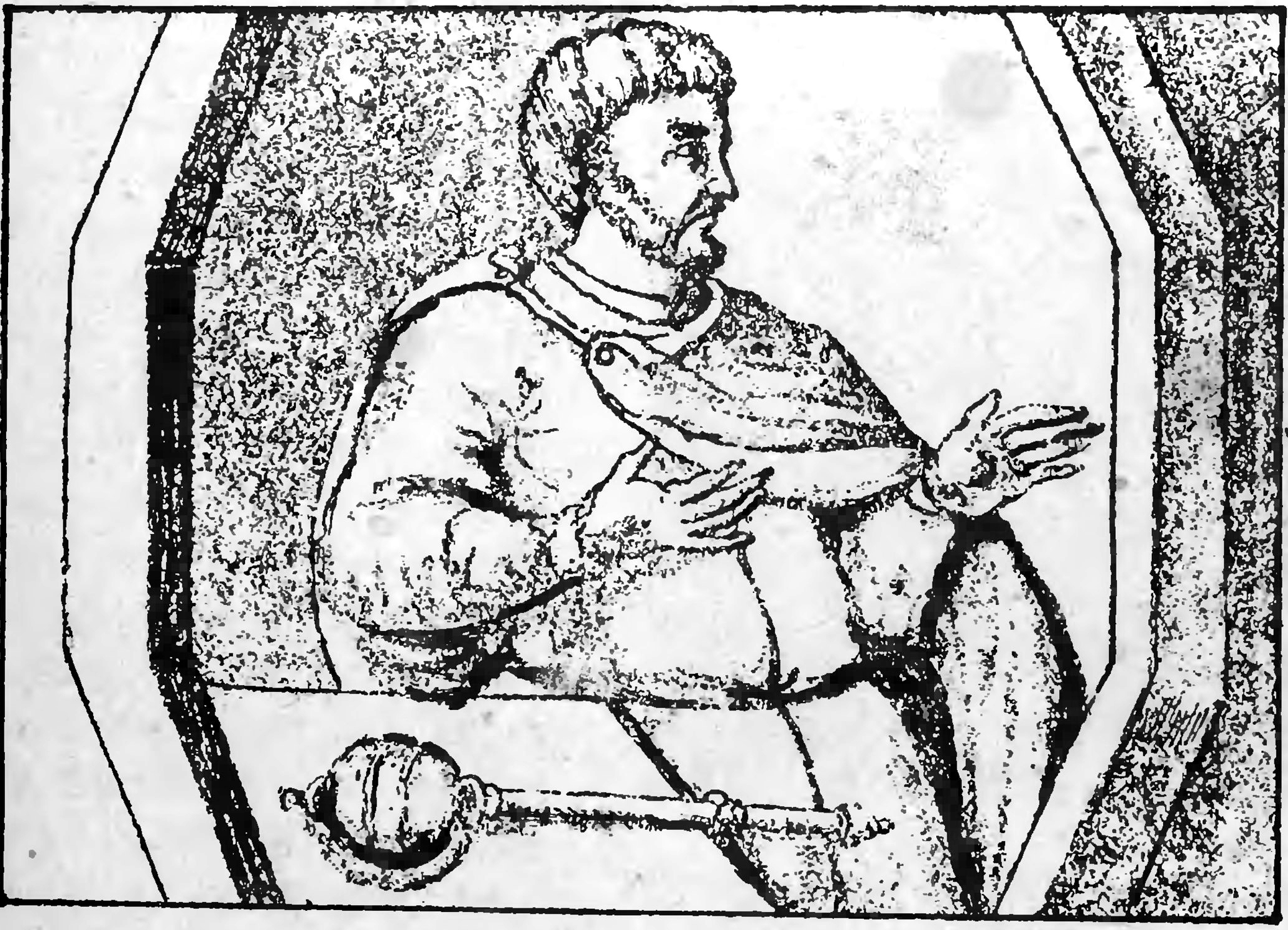
Demian Mnohohrishny

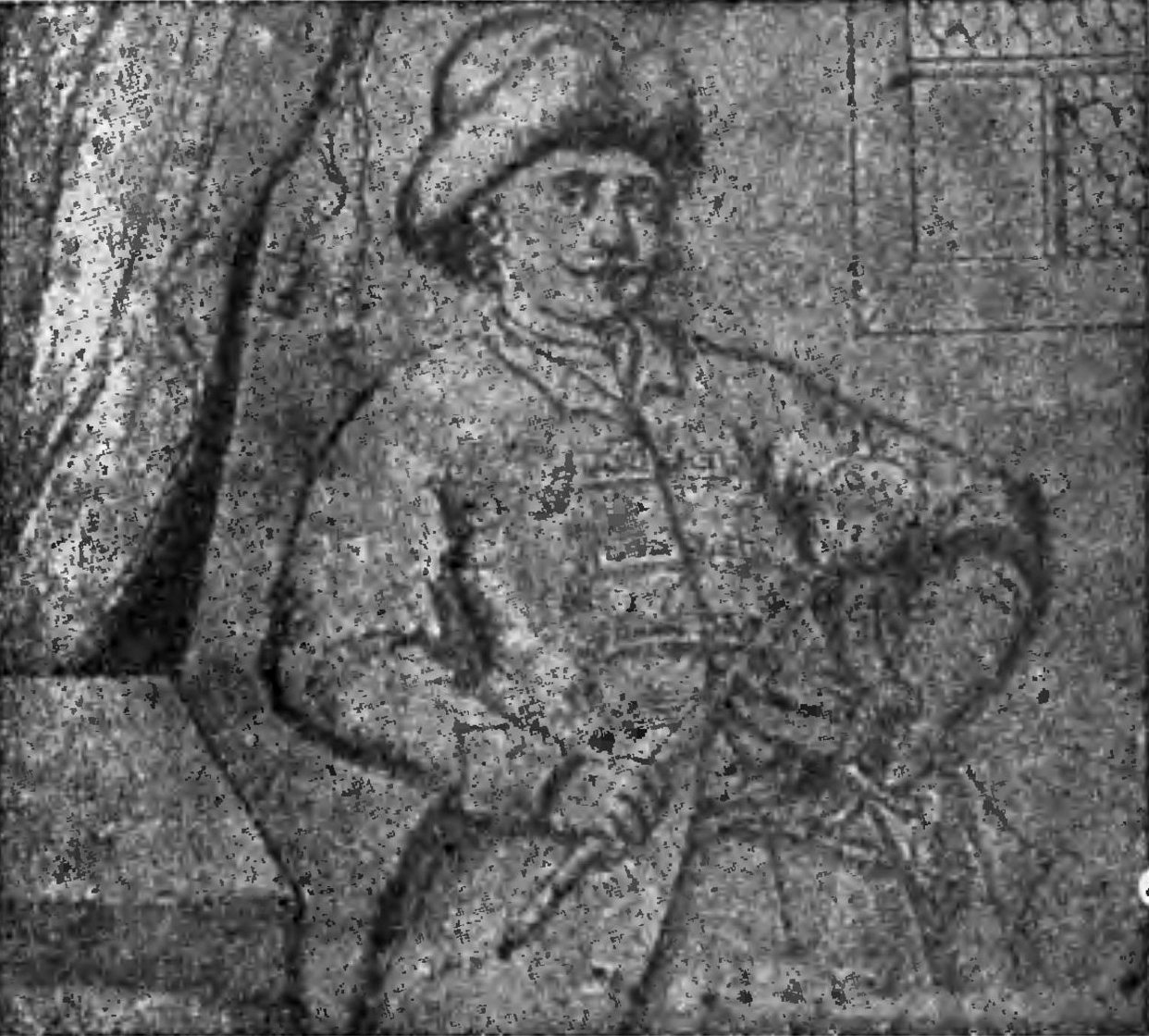
Mykhailo Khanenko

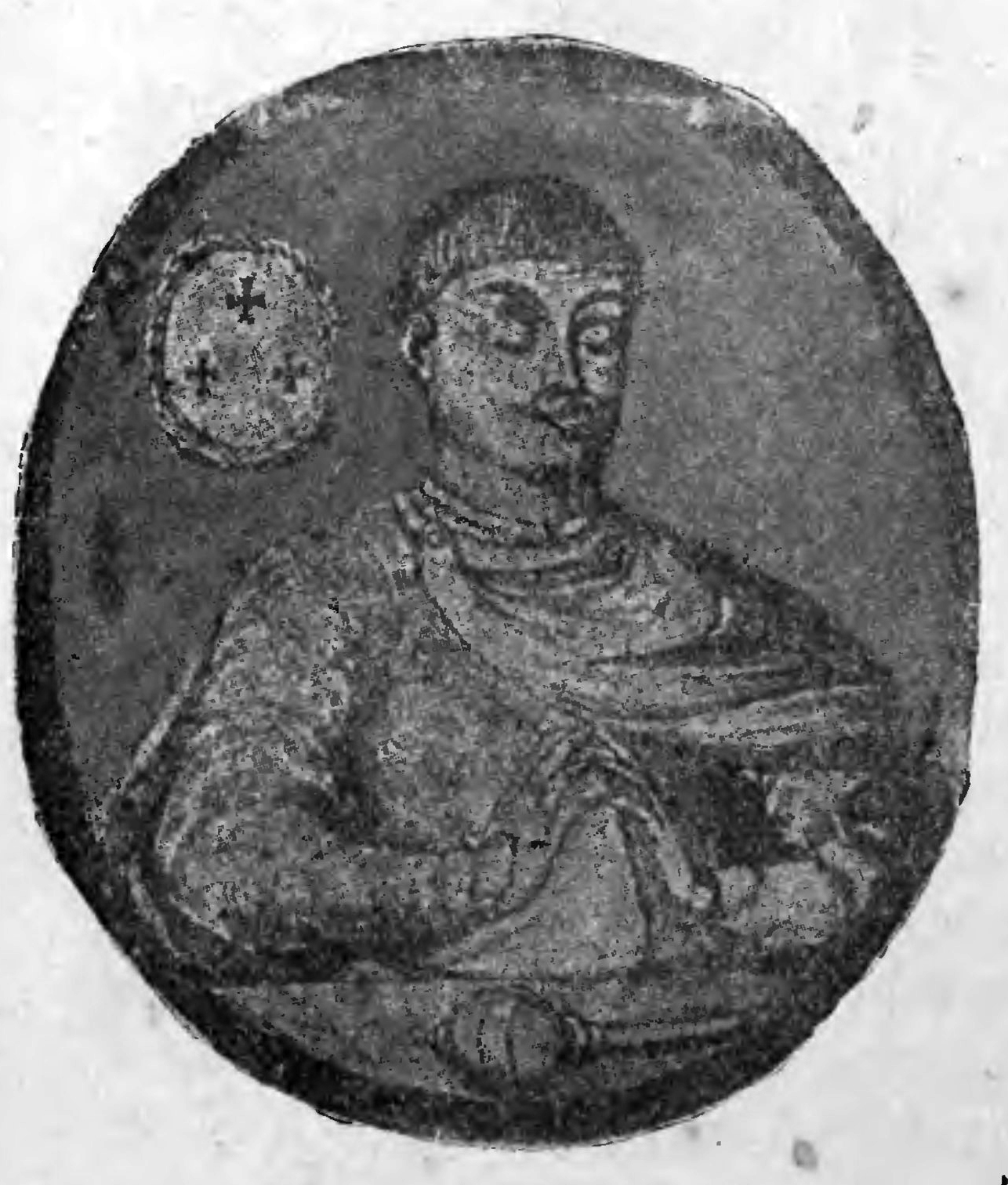
Ivan Briukhovetsky "in the coffin"

== Editions and manuscripts ==
Samiilo Velychko's Chronicle is known in two editions, including the author's original. The original was purchased in 1840 in Moscow by commission agent Bolshakov at an auction held by the famous collector Laptev for academician M. Pogodin. Pogodin informed O. Bodiansky and M. Maksimovich of his purchase, and they immediately understood the great significance of the manuscript. However, M. Pogodin charged an enormous fee, and O. Bodiansky was unable to publish it. In 1842–1845, O. Bodiansky and M. Gulak made copies of this manuscript. Pogodin gave the manuscript he had acquired to Kyiv Archeographic Commission, where it was published over a number of years under the title Chronicle of Events in Southwestern Rus' in the 17th Century. (І том — 1848, II том — 1851, III том — 1855, IV том — 1864) It is a rare edition, but it is available to readers in Ukraine. The work was first published in four volumes in 1848–64 by the Kyiv Archaeographic Commission. Another copy of the manuscript was found by historian M. Sudiyenko; this copy once belonged to a member of the commission for the compilation of the New Code of 1767–1769 from the Lubensky Regiment, Ukrainian political figure, and collector of documents on the history of Ukraine, Hryhorii Poletyka. The manuscript is kept at the Russian National Library in Saint Petersburg, and one of the copies of the work is kept at the Manuscript Institute of the National Library of Ukraine.

In 1926, the All-Ukrainian Academy of Sciences undertook the reissue of Samiilo Velychko's work. The first part of the chronicle was published, returning to its original title, The Tale of the Cossack War with the Poles (Kyiv, 1926, Academy of Sciences, 268 pages).

On 14 October 2020, a presentation of the complete edition of the Chronicle took place in Baturyn. For the first time in 300 years, it was published in the form in which the author originally created it. The publication contains the full text of Velychko's work, reconstructed according to his plan, a biography of the author of the monument, a codicological analysis of the original manuscript, the history of its creation, storage and publication, historiography, archaeographic comments, as well as a table of documents, literary and historical works used by Velychko.

== Publications ==
- Reprint edition of 1926:
  Samiilo Velychko, Сказаніє о войнѣ козацкой з поляками. Kyiv: All-Ukrainian Academy of Sciences, 1926. 268 pp.
- Samiilo Velychko, Літопис: у 2 т. / translated from literary Ukrainian, introductory article, commentary. Valery Oleksandrovych Shevchuk; Ed. Oleksa Vasylovych Mishanich. Kyiv: Dnipro, 1991.
- Збірник козацьких літописів: Густинський. Самійла Величка. Грабянки [Collection of Cossack chronicles: Hustynsky. Samiilo Velychko. Hrabianka].. / [упоряд. та пер.: В. Крекотень, В. Шевчук, Р. Іванченко]. Kyiv: Dnipro, 2006.
- Velychko, Samiĭlo (2020). "Litopys" (in Ukrainian). Kyiv: Klio. ISBN 978-617-7755-07-3. Величко, С. Літопис / Ред. кол.: В. Смолій (відп. ред.), Tatiana Tairova-Yakovleva (editor-in-chief), Г. Боряк, А. Бовгиря, Л. Дубровіна, Д. Ципкін; Упоряд.: Г. Боряк, Т. Таїрова-Яковлєва; Підгот. до друку: А. Багро, С. Багро, А. Бовгиря, Т. Добрянська, О. Іванова, В. Кононенко, М. Филипович. National Academy of Sciences of Ukraine: Institute of History of Ukraine. Saint Petersburg State University: Centre for Ukrainian Studies.

== See also ==
- Chernihiv Chronicle
- Eyewitness Chronicle
- History of the Ruthenians (Istoriya Rusiv)
- Hustyn Chronicle
- Hrabianka Chronicle
- Huklyv Chronicle
- Lviv Chronicle

== Sources ==
- Brogi, Giovanna (2021). "Echoes of Renaissance and Baroque: History Writing in Velychko's Chronicle". Harvard Ukrainian Studies. 38 (3/4). Harvard Ukrainian Research Institute: 193–204. ISSN 0363-5570. JSTOR 48733659.
- Kohut, Zenon E. (2021). "More Authentic Than the Archival Copies: The Veracity of Velychko's Documentation for the Mazepa Era". Harvard Ukrainian Studies. 38 (3/4). Harvard Ukrainian Research Institute: 205–218. ISSN 0363-5570. JSTOR 48733660.
- Sysyn, Frank E. (1990). "The Cossack Chronicles and the Development of Modern Ukrainian Culture and National Identity". Harvard Ukrainian Studies. 14 (3/4). Harvard Ukrainian Research Institute: 593–607. ISSN 0363-5570. JSTOR 41036403.
- Sysyn, Frank E. (2021). "Unmasking Velychko". Harvard Ukrainian Studies. 38 (3/4). Harvard Ukrainian Research Institute: 219–226. ISSN 0363-5570. JSTOR 48733661.
- Tairova-Yakovleva, Tatiana (2021). "The Chronicle of Samiilo Velychko: Toward a New Academic Edition". Harvard Ukrainian Studies. 38 (3/4). Harvard Ukrainian Research Institute: 175–192. ISSN 0363-5570. JSTOR 48733658.
- Сас П. М. Величко Самійло Васильович та його літопис //Encyclopedia of History of Ukraine : in 10 vols. / editors: V. A. Smolii (head) and others. Institute of History of Ukraine, National Academy of Sciences of Ukraine. Kyiv: Naukova Dumka, 2003. Volume 1: A — V. — P. 472. — ISBN 966-00-0734-5 .
- Літопис Самійла Величка // Юридична енциклопедія [Legal Encyclopedia], Volume 3.
- Соболь В. А. Літопис Самійла Величка як явище українського літературного бароко / [Відп. ред.: Ф. Д. Пустова, В. В. Яременко]. — [Донецьк: МП «Отечество», 1996]. — 333, [1] с.
- Таирова-Яковлева Т. Г. К вопросу о структуре и источниковой базе летописи Самойла Величко // Славяноведение, № 2. — М., 2019. — С. 11-24.
- Федака Сергій. Літописні джерела з історії княжої і козацької України-Русі / Ужгород. нац. ун-т. Каф. історії України. — Ужгород: Подяк, 2003. — 138, [1] с.
