= Brief Description of Little Russia =

- Короткий опис Малоросії (КОМ)
- Author(s): unknown
- Language: Literary Ukrainian (Late Ruthenian)
- Date: c. 1730s
- Manuscript(s): more than 50 manuscripts and editions
- Period covered: 1506–1734 (with a brief intro from 1240 to 1506)

The Brief Description of Little Russia, abbreviated KOM, (Note: Original title: Краткое описание Малороссии, Kratkoye opysanye Malorossyy. Modern Ukrainian: Короткий опис Малоросії, romanized: Korotkyj opys Malorosiji, abbreviated "КОМ".) is a Ukrainian chronicle written by an anonymous author in the 1730s.

== Composition ==
The main source for the KOM was the Hrabianka Chronicle. From this, the author selected the most significant facts and summarised them, whilst writing his own original account of the events of the first third of the 18th century. The work is written in literary Ukrainian (Late Ruthenian).

== Contents ==
The chronicle provides an overview of events from 1506–1734, with a brief intro from the Mongol invasion of Kyivan Rus' (1240) to 1506, with "1340" as the first year explicitly mentioned. It becomes more detailed from 1506 onwards, taking the form of annalistic entries by year (although many years are skipped between 1506 and 1620), with the most detailed account covering the era of Bohdan Khmelnytsky and the Great Northern War (1700–1721). The author (who presumably belonged to the patriotically-minded Cossack starshyna) links the Cossack period of Ukraine’s history with the history of Kyivan Rus’; he recounts the history of the Cossacks, extols the Ukrainian people’s struggle for liberation against the Polish–Lithuanian Commonwealth, and expresses sympathy for its leaders (Bohdan Khmelnytsky, Ivan Bohun, Severyn Nalyvaiko, Semen Paliy and others).

== Popularity and influence ==
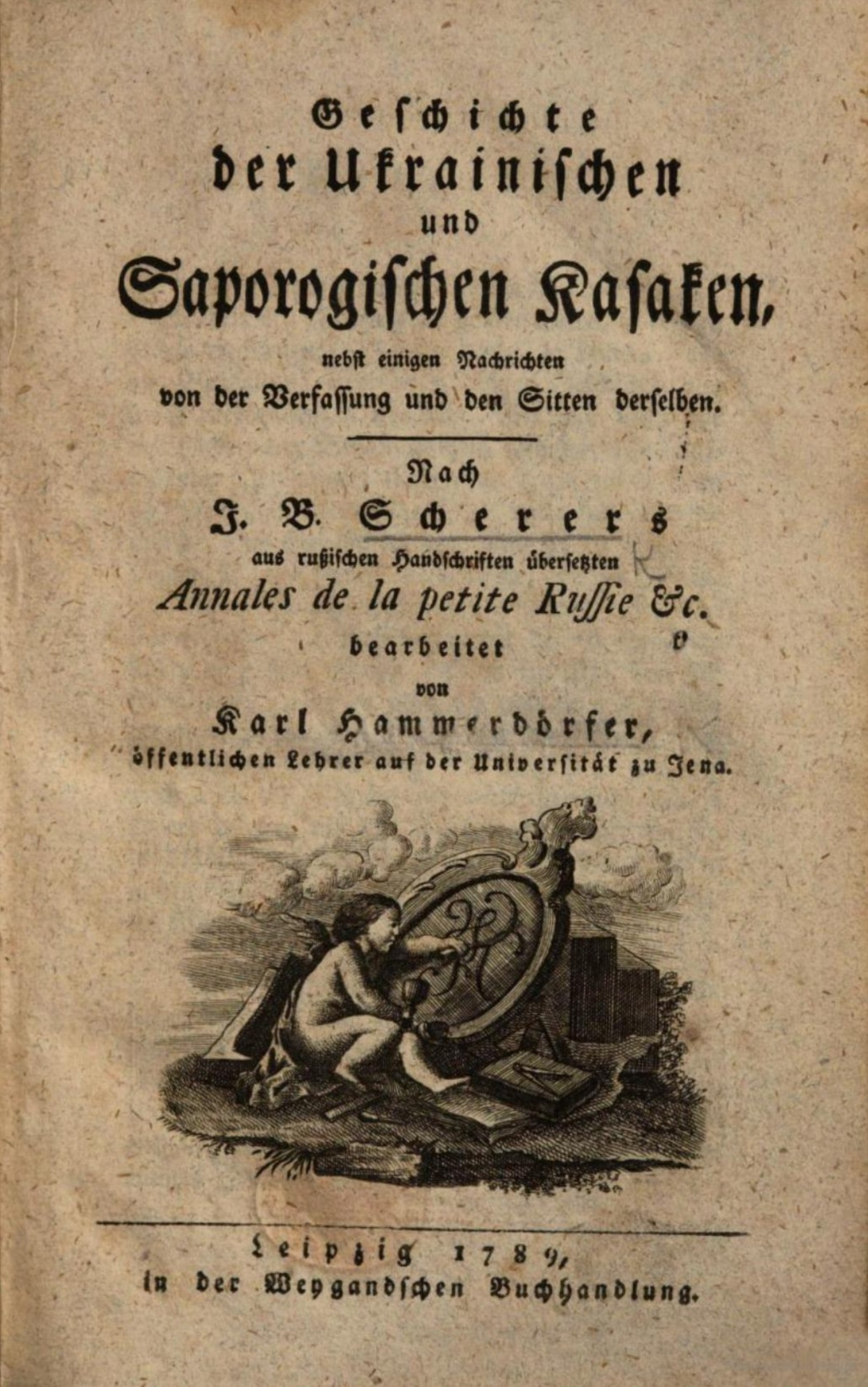
1789 German edition of Schérer's Annals of Little Russia, or History of the Ukrainian and Zaporizhian Cossacks.

Manuscripts of the Brief Description of Little Russia (KOM) began to circulate in Ukraine in the 1740s. The KOM gained widespread popularity in Ukraine, where it has been preserved in more than 50 manuscripts and editions. Reasons for its great popularity have been attributed to its concise and clear style of writing, the fact that it was based on the similarly popular Hrabianka Chronicle, and according to Mytsyk (1999) "that the unknown author managed to give the reader an idea of the historical past of Ukraine during the Cossack era (from 1506) in the most concise form". Given that it appeared in a time when the Ukrainian people were "devastated by Russian colonialism" as the Cossack Hetmanate and Zaporizhian Sich were gradually being eroded and abolished, the picture that the KOM painted of a glorious past with full state independence awakened patriotism and hope for a better future in its readers. According to Serhii Plokhy (2012), by 1777, the KOM "had become the most popular compendium of Ukrainian history in the Hetmanate." It also greatly influenced Ukrainian historiography and literature from the mid-18th century until the early 19th century.

The KOM became the basis or an important source for the following works:

- Novhorod-Siverskyi Chronicle (1760s), used the Brief Description of Little Russia as a source
- Vasyl Ruban, «Краткой летописи Малыя России c 1506 no 1776 год…» [A Brief Chronicle of Little Russia from 1506 to 1776, with the Disclosure of a True Picture of the Local Administration and the Publication of a List of Earlier Hetmans, General Officers, Colonels, and Hierarchs.] (Saint Petersburg 1777). Ruban claimed that the 1734–1776 continuation had been written by Oleksandr Bezborodko, Colonel (Polkovnyk) of Kyiv.
- Jean-Benoît Schérer, published manuscripts of the KOM in supplements in 1786 in Paris, and used it as the basis of his "Annals of Little Russia, or History of the Ukrainian and Zaporizhian Cossacks".
  - French edition: Annales de la petite Russie ou Histoire des Cosaques-Saporogues et des Cosaques de l’Ukraine' (Paris 1788). The second volume contained his French translation of the Brief Description of Little Russia.
  - German edition: Geschichte der Ukrainischen und Saporogischen Kasaken nebst einigen Nachrichten von der Verfassung und den Sitten derselben (Leipzig).
    - A History of Rus' (Ruskaia istoriia), or the Starodub manuscript which Ivan Zabelin brought to the State Historical Museum, purportedly "written by Yakov Radkevichev on 24 January 1734", appears to contain a direct Russian translation from Schérer's Annales in French. Plokhy therefore considered the attributed date "bogus", pointing out that on the title page and the end notes, different hands had written other confused dates (ranging from 1812 to 1676, all of which were historically inaccurate, except Napoleon's invasion of Russia taking place in 1812). Nonetheless, there was a Yakiv Fedorovych Radkevych who was a teacher in Starodub in the early 19th century, who may have been the author or copyist.
- History of the Ruthenians (Istoriya Rusiv, c. 1800), heavily influenced by the French edition of Schérer's Annales, most likely through the Starodub manuscript.
- «Лѣтописце, или кратком описании знатнѣйших дѣйств и случаев, что в котором году дѣялося в Украинѣ Малороссійской обѣих сторон Днѣпра и кто именно когда гетьманом был козацким» ["A Chronicle, or a brief account of the most notable events and occurrences that took place in that year in Little Russia, on both sides of the Dnieper, and who exactly served as Cossack hetman and when"], (1888).

Plokhy (2012) demonstrated a direct link of textual borrowing between the Brief Description (KOM), Ruban (1777), Schérer's French edition (1788), the Starodub manuscript, and the History of the Ruthenians (Istoriya Rusiv, c. 1800) through the misspellings of personal names such as "Stefan Czarniecki", who campaigned against the Cossacks in Ukraine in the year 1653.

- Brief Description of Russia (1734; 1878 edition): "In that same year, 1653, the king of Poland, having learned of this discord among the Cossacks, dispatched Chernetsky [Чернецкого, Chernetskoho] with an army to Ukraine to wage war." (Note: "Тогожъ 1653 года король полский, извЂстясь о томъ несогласіи козаковъ, командировалъ Чернецкого съ войскомъ на Украину вревать. который тотъ часъ ЛЂнцЂ.")
- Ruban (1777): "In 1653, the King dispatched Chernetsky [Чернецкого, Chernetskogo] with a Polish army to Ukraine (...)." (Note: "ВЪ 1653 году Король отрядилЪ Чернецкого съ войскомЪ ПольскимЪ вЪ Украину (...).")
- Schérer (1788): "The year 1653, the king of Poland, informed about what happened in Ukraine, dispatched Tschernezki with an army to wage war there." (Note: "L'an 1653, le roi de Pologne informé de ce qui se passoit en Ukraine, envoya Tschernezki avec une armée pour y porter la guerre.")
- Starodub manuscript: "The Polish king, having learned what was going on in Ukraine, dispatched Chetvertynsky with an army."
- Istoriya Rusiv: "The Polish king, having obtained news of the most recent defeat of the Polish army, which had been under the command of Prince Chetvertynsky" [Четвертинскаго, Chetvertynskaho], ordered a new expedition against Ukraine.' (Note: "Король Польскій, получа извЂстіе о послЂднемъ пораженіи арміи Польской, бывшей подъ командою князя Четвертинскаго...")

Plokhy commented: "The author of the History [of the Rus'] mistook the mysterious Chetvertynsky [in the Starodub manuscript] for another figure, Prince Chetvertynsky", and invented an episode in which the Cossacks defeated him, necessitating a second expedition. "No sources refer to Chetvertynsky as the head of a Polish army in Ukraine in 1653 except the Russian translation of Scherer [in the Starodub manuscript] and the History of the Rus'."

== See also ==
- The History of the Zaporizhian Cossacks (1740s), historical work written by Semen Ivanovych Myshetsky

== Bibliography ==
=== Critical editions ===
- Osip Bodyansky, Eyewitness Chronicle, with the Brief Description of Little Russia (Лѣтописецъ въ Малой Россіи) ["Chronicler in Little Russia"] as an appendix (Moscow 1846).
- Levytsky, Orest, ed. (1878). "Краткое описание Малороссии" [Brief Description of Little Russia]. Летопись Самовидца по новооткрытым спискам. С приложением трех малороссийских хроник: Хмельницкой, ”Краткого описания Малороссии” и ”Собрания Исторического” [The Eyewitness Chronicle, based on newly discovered manuscripts. With three Little Russian chronicles appended: Khmelnytsky Chronicle, "Brief Description of Little Russia" and "Historical Collection"] (in Russian). Kyiv: Kyiv Archeographic Commission. pp. 211–319.
- Apanovych, Olena Mykhaylivna (1983). Рукописная светская книга XVIII в. на Украине. Исторические сборники [18th-century handwritten secular books in Ukraine. Historical anthologies] (in Russian). Naukova Dumka. pp. 187–211.
- Mytsyk, Yuri Andriyovych (1999). "Невідома редакція «Короткого опису Малоросії»" [Unknown edition of "Brief Description of Little Russia"]. Історіографічні дослідження в Україні / Historiographical studies in Ukraine, 1968–2020 (7). Institute of History of Ukraine: 133–154.

=== Literature ===
- Bovhyrja, Andrii, ed. (2012). Короткий опис Малоросії (1340-1776), упорядкування та вступна стаття Андрія Бовгирі [Brief Description of Little Russia (1340–1776), compiled and with an introductory essay by Andrii Bovhyrja] (in Ukrainian). Kyiv: Stylos. p. 192. ISBN 978-966-193-071-0.
- Mytsyk, Yuri Andriyovych (1960). "Короткий опис Малоросії" [Brief Description of Little Russia]. Ukrainian Soviet Encyclopedia (in Ukrainian). Vol. 5. Main Editorial Office of the Ukrainian Soviet Encyclopedia. p. 424.
- Mytsyk, Yuri Andriyovych (2008). "Короткий опис Малоросії" [Brief Description of Little Russia]. Encyclopedia of History of Ukraine (in Ukrainian). Vol. 5. Kyiv: Institute of History of Ukraine. p. 185. Archived from the original on 27 June 2026.
- Plokhy, Serhii (2012). The Cossack Myth: History and Nationhood in the Age of Empires. Cambridge: Cambridge University Press. p. 503. ISBN 9781139540162. (A monograph entirely dedicated to examining the History of the Ruthenians manuscript tradition).

=== Further reading ===
- (in Russian) Volodymyr Antonovych, [Передмова] (Foreword). In the book: Сборник летописей, относящихся к истории Южной и Западной Руси [A collection of chronicles relating to the history of Southern and Western Rus’]. Kyiv (1888).
- (in Russian) Volodymyr Ikonnykov. Опыт русской историографии [The Expertise of Rus' Historiography], Vol. 2, Book 2. Kyiv (1908).
- (in Ukrainian) Dmytro Bahalii. Нарис української історіографії [An Overview of Ukrainian Historiography], Vol. 1, No. 2. Джерелознавство [Source Studies]. Kyiv (1925).
