= History of the Ruthenians =

Anonymous historico-political treatise

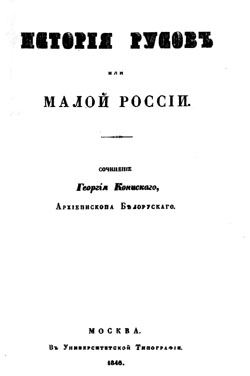
1846 printed edition by Osip Bodyansky

History of the Ruthenians, or Little Russia (Note: Pre-1918 reform orthography Russian: Исторія Русовъ, или Малой Россіи, romanized: Istoriya Rusovû, ili Maloy Rossiy. Modern Russian: История русов или Малой России, romanized: Istoriya rusov ili Maloy Rossii. Modern Ukrainian: Історія Русів чи Малої Росії, romanized: Istorija Rusiv chi Maloji Rosiji, or Istoriya Rusiv.), or more briefly History of the Ruthenians or History of the Rus', is an anonymous historico-political treatise, most likely written at the turn of the 18th and 19th centuries. It had a great influence on the formation of the Ukrainian national identity in the 19th and 20th centuries, and was even named "the most prominent historical work in Ukraine". It was written and originally published in pre-reform Russian, and describes the history of the Ruthenians and their state, Little Russia (Russian: Малой Россіи, in the book's terminology), from antiquity to 1769. It mostly focuses on the history of the Zaporizhian Sich and the Cossack Hetmanate.

== Contents ==
The History writes that the Ukrainian Cossacks ("Little Russian Cossacks") descended from the Rus' or Rusy (Русь), a people separate from the other Slavic peoples, especially from the Muscovites, or "Great Russians". The Rusy are said to have settled the lands between the Danube, the Daugava, the Donets, and the Black Sea, which were divided into Red Rus' / Ruthenia (modern Ukraine) and White Rus' / Ruthenia (modern Belarus). Not until Ivan the Terrible formed the Muscovite or Russian Tsardom in the 16th century, would Red and White Rus' supposedly adopt the name "Little Russia" to distinguish themselves from Muscovy or "Great Russia". Eventually the narrative shifts from Red and White Rus' to the Zaporizhian Host and the Cossack Hetmanate. Occasionally, the author takes an interest in Austrian Galicia and other Western Ukrainian territories, and treats them as part of Ukraine or Little Russia, while distinguishing the latter from Belarus and Muscovy.

The author prefers the term "Little Russia", and tries to avoid the term "Ukraine", as he believes it to be something Polish. However, starting from the 17th century and the Khmelnytsky Uprising, the History frequently employs the toponym "Ukraine", as this is how it ubiquitously appears in the sources he refers to, and bases his narrative on.

=== Composition ===
The following sources have been identified as constituent parts of the History of the Ruthenians, or having heavily influenced its composition:

- Hryhorii Hrabianka, Hrabianka Chronicle (c. 1710).
  - anonymous, Brief Description of Little Russia (1730s).
    - Vasyl Ruban and Oleksandr Bezborodko, Brief Chronicle of Little Russia from 1506 to 1776 (Saint Petersburg, 1777).
      - Jean-Benoît Schérer, Annales de la petite Russie ou Histoire des Cosaques-Saporogues et des Cosaques de l’Ukraine (Paris, 1788).
- Daniel Ernst Wagner, Geschichte von Polen (1775).
- Various Russian literary narratives first published in the years 1804–1809.

== Provenance ==
=== Manuscript circulation ===
The History circulated in manuscript form for a long time before it was finally published in print in 1846, by Osip Bodyansky at Moscow University. The first-known mention of the text as "the Konysky History" is in a letter, dated 21 October 1825 from the village of Ponurivka (Ponurovka, modern Bryansk Oblast), by Alexander von Brigen to Kondraty Ryleyev (both of whom soon became leaders of the Decembrist Revolt, which on 14 December 1825 failed to overthrow the Russian autocratic government). Brigen wrote: "Having carried out your request, esteemed Kondratii Fedorovich [Ryleyev], I am sending you herewith an extract copied from the Konysky History." Ryleyev had been writing poetry about the Ukrainian Cossacks, but he needed additional sources on Ukrainian history; his friend Brigen had told him about a manuscript known as the "Konysky History" at his father-in-law's estate in Ponurivka, which he visited between June and October 1825, during which time he copied an excerpt from the manuscript for Ryleyev's writings. In 1828, another manuscript of the History was discovered on the former estate of Alexander Bezborodko's brother Ilia in Hryniv (Гринёво, in Pogarsky District near Starodub).

Between its first mention in the 1825 letter and its first publication in print in 1846, the History of the Ruthenians was copied and recopied numerous times by devotees of Ukrainian Cossack history. This was in part due to the popularity of Romantic poems such as Nalyvaiko's Confession and Voinarovsky, which Ryleyev published shortly before the ill-fated Decembrist Revolt, apparently based on the materials of the "Konysky History", in which the Nalyvaiko Uprising of the 1590s and Ivan Mazepa's revolt of 1708–1709 were romanticised, promoting an image of the Ukrainian Cossacks as righteous and brave freedom fighters against tyrannical oppression, be it from the Polish king or the Russian tsar.

Alexander Pushkin first became acquainted with the History in 1829, when critics panned his poem Poltava as inaccurate, but Mykhailo Maksymovych argued that Pushkin's description of an incident whereby tsar Peter I had grabbed Mazepa's moustache at a banquet was authentic, because the History of the Ruthenians also mentioned it. Two years later, Pushkin himself would retort in writing that "the Konysky Chronicle" vindicated his poem. Simultaneously, in response to the 1830–1831 Polish November Uprising, he was using the manuscript in preparing to write a state-sponsered anti-Polish and pro-Imperial Russian history of Cossack Ukraine (Little Russia), but the project was shelved once the revolt was crushed. In 1836, he became the first to uncritically accept the attribution of the text to Konysky, seeing in the Belarusian bishop his own predecessor, namely, a Russian patriot and anti-Catholic Orthodox zealot. Unlike Decembrists Ryleyev and Brigen, who used the History to promote constitutional republicanism and liberal values, Pushkin turned it into a tool for Russian autocracy and imperialism.

Meanwhile, Nikolai Gogol's novel Taras Bulba was published in 1835 amidst much acclaim for its fictional but sympathetic depiction of Cossack officers, executed by Polish authorities in Warsaw, a non-historical narrative taken directly from the History of the Ruthenians. Controversially, Gogol's second edition in 1842 was much more laden with Russian nationalism, anachronistically portraying all 17th-century Ukrainian Cossacks as "Russians", which many readers of the novel mistook for historical fact.

By the late 1830s, when German traveller J.G. Kohl visited Dnieper Ukraine, he reported that the "Kanevsky [Konysky] history" was remarably popular amongst the local nobility, with a copy of the text on every estate in some regions. Taras Shevchenko likely first encountered the text of the manuscript around 1840; his poem A Dream (written in Saint Petersburg in July 1844) was significantly influenced by the History of the Ruthenians' portrayal of hetman Pavlo Polubotok's fate. Shevchenko interpreted the History as "a call to arms in defense of the Ukrainian nation against its oppressors, the Russian tsars and nobles." In turn, Shevchenko thus employed the manuscript for building up poetry and literature full of Ukrainian nationalism. Mykola Kostomarov, his close friend and leader of the Brotherhood of Saints Cyril and Methodius, had written the Books of the Genesis of the Ukrainian People in the mid-1840s, which also heavily relied on the History of the Ruthenians for its information. Panteleimon Kulish in 1843 published a History-based Ukrainian-language historical treatise named Ukraine: From the Origin of Ukraine to Father Khmelnytsky, as well as a Russian-language novel Mykhailo Charnyshenko, or Little Russia Eighty Years Ago based on the History.

=== Printed editions ===
Brigen told Ryleyev in his October 1825 letter that he was considering "a critical edition of Konysky, which contains a great deal that is fine and unknown to Karamzin himself"; but these plans never materialised, as the Decembrist Revolt was crushed, Ryleyev was executed, and Brigen exiled to Siberia for 30 years. It was not until 1834 when the Kharkiv Romantics were the first to publish some excerpts of the History in print in the journal Zaporozhkaia starina ("Zaporizhian Antiquities"). In 1836, Puhskin published long excerpts from a manuscript of History of the Ruthenians in his journal Sovremennik ("The Contemporary"), saying that "Many passages in the History of Little Russia are pictures drawn by the brush of a great painter", and hoping the fulltext would be printed soon. But because of the freethinking aspects of the History (according to J.G. Kohl), state censorship long held back a complete publication.

The History was finally published in print in 1846 by the Ukrainian-born academic Osip Bodyansky at the Imperial Society of Russian History and Antiquities at Moscow University, which was exempt from regular censorship. In the critical edition's introduction, Bodyansky explained he had collected a number of manuscript copies of the History, and "I selected the best of them, added readings form other copies, and then proposed that the Imperial Society (...) publish it, which is now accomplished."

Starting with the 1972–1973 Ukrainian purge, Brezhnev-era Soviet Communism repressed Cossack studies as "bourgeois nationalism". No critical edition of the History of the Rus' could therefore be published in the Ukrainian SSR until 1983, when restrictions on Cossack studies were somewhat relaxed again. In a volume on 18th-century Ukrainian literature, the Shevchenko Institute of Literature cautiously published excerpts of the History that would likely be acceptable to the prevailing ideologies of the day, namely anti-Polish Cossack uprisings, Cossack resistance to the Union of Brest, and the impression that the Ukrainian and Russian past were intertwined.

In early 1991, during the 1989–1991 Ukrainian revolution, a reprint of Bodyansky's 1846 editio princeps was published in Kyiv in 100,000 copies. In May 1991, a Ukrainian translation by Ivan Drach (a leading figure of the People's Movement of Ukraine, or Rukh) was published in 200,000 copies, remarkable given the troubled economic situation in the Soviet Union at the time, but understandable given the renewed interest in Ukrainian Cossack history as the Ukrainian independence movement gained strength. Drach stated in the introduction: "This is a book to bring us to our senses. It always comes to Ukrainians at times of decision. Needless to say, this is just such a time." In 2001, this Ukrainian edition was reprinted with better quality, although only in 5,000 copies. By the late 1990s, some Ukrainian scholars began reviewing the History more critically as any other work of Ukrainian historiography, and did not accept it as simply a prophecy of an independent Ukraine, as it was widely treated in the early 1990s.

== Studies ==
=== Authorship ===
The book was written as a political essay by an unknown author at the end of the 18th or early 19th century.

The title page ascribed the work to "Georgy Konissky, Belarusian Archbishop" (1717–1795). Subsequently, his authorship was seriously questioned. In 1857, Panteleimon Kulish was amongst the first skeptics to challenge the authenticity of the History and Konysky's credibility, while Taras Shevchenko maintained it (and his own interpretation of it) until his death in 1861. Throughout the 1860s, debate about the text's authorship raged in full force; by 1870, Mykhailo Drahomanov wrote that "Maksymovych's view, now universally accepted, [is] that the History of the Rus' was not written by Konysky." The true author has not been established.

One of the proposed authors is Hryhoriy Poletyka (1725–1784). The ideas and style of the History are similar to the Historical Reference, which Poletyka submitted to Empress Catherine II. In 1893, Vasyl Horlenko wrote in Kievskaia starina about indications that Vasyl Poletyka, the son of Hryhorii Poletyka, must have been the author of the History. This assertion divided scholars between supporters of Hryhorii and Vasyl, with Mykhailo Hrushevsky in 1894 coming out in favour of the compromise hypothesis of Leonid Maikov that father Poletyka may have started the text and son Poletyka completed it. Until the late 1930s, the Poletykas were the most popular candidates.

Another candidate (among others) is her Grand Chancellor Alexander (Oleksandr) Bezborodko, Colonel (Polkovnyk) of Kyiv. According to the Brief Chronicle of Little Russia from 1506 to 1776, published by Vasyl Ruban in Saint Petersburg in 1777, Bezborodko had written the concluding section from 1734 to 1776, which Volodymyr Ikonnykov in 1908 noted had remarkably close textual parallels with the same section in the History of the Ruthenians. In 1925, Mykhailo Slabchenko made the argument that both texts had been written by Bezborodko, in 1937 supported by an article of Andrii Yakovliv. Yakovliv also supported Mykhailo Vozniak's 1939 book Pseudo-Konysky and Pseudo-Poletyka: The “History of the Rus′” in Literature and Scholarship, the most comprehensive status quaestionis on the authorship question so far. Vozniak argued in favour of Bezborodko, building on the evidence of Ikonnykov, Slabchenko and Yakovliv with new observations.

Numerous other authors have been proposed and subsequently dismissed in the late 19th century and throughout the 20th century. In a May 1942 paper, Oleksander Ohloblyn (a history professor at Kyiv University, and for a month in 1941 the German-appointed mayor of Kyiv) observed that Novhorod-Siversky and the Siveria region were heavily overrepresented in the History of the Ruthenians, and concluded the author had been Oleksandr Khanenko (c. 1776 – c. 1817). Although he later abandoned trying to establish an author in the 1950s and stuyding the History altogether in the 1960s, his meticulous topographical observations greatly contributed to later research.

Serhii Plokhy (2012) observed that the contents of the History of the Rus' had much in common with the legal and historical memoranda of 1804–1819, which the Ukrainian (Little Russian) nobility that had descended from the Cossack starshyna class was using to assert their rights and privileges as nobles. These memoranda were written in direct response to the actions of the Imperial Russian Heraldry Office, which in the years 1804–1809 and 1816–1819 had been taking away the noble statuses of hundreds of Ukrainian aristocrats descended from officers of the Cossack Hetmanate for allegedly failing to provide evidence that they were entitled to noble privileges equal to those of the Russian nobility.

=== Dating ===
The text ends with the statement: "At the beginning of 1769 the troops set off on a general campaign, and a true war began with the Turks. How it will end, God knows!", suggesting it was written in or soon after 1769, the second year of the Russo-Turkish War of 1768–1774. The author thus wanted the reader to believe that he had no knowledge that the war ended in 1774.

However, there are several important reasons for not taking this statement at face value, most of which were first observed by Anatolii Yershov (1926):

- Yeshov noted that the History makes reference to Daniel Ernst Wagner's Geschichte von Polen, not printed until 1775.
- The History contains obvious borrowings from the Brief Chronicle of Little Russia of Ruban and Bezborodko, not printed until 1777.
- Yershov noted that the History mentions the Stone of Tmutarakan, which was not discovered until 1792.
- Yershov noted that the History once references the rule of Catherine II in the past tense, implying it must have been written after her death in 1796.
- The History contains numerous references to ministers and ministries, which were not introduced in the Russian Empire until Alexander I's Ministerial Reform of 1802.
- Yershov argued that circumstantial evidence in the form of many references to nations and national rights, might indicate that the History was influenced by the Napoleonic Wars.
- Yershov suggested that references to the "system of the balance of power", which seems to refer to the system created by the 1814–1815 Congress of Vienna, could indicate that the History was written after the Congress.
- Most surviving manuscripts of the History of the Ruthenians date from the 1830s and 1840s, with the oldest manuscript dated by watermarks stemming from 1809 (although this is uncertain), the second-oldest from 1817/1818, and the third-oldest from 1814 or (more likely) 1818 as well. This proves that the text could not have been written after 1818, and suggests that the text became highly popular soon after 1818, but was virtually unknown before that date.

Based on these observations, Yeshov concluded the History of the Ruthenians was most likely written between 1815 and 1818. This dating effectively ruled out Konysky (died 1795), Hryhorii Poletyka (died 1784) and Bezborodko (died 1799) as authorship candidates.

By 1983, Soviet Ukrainian historians still assumed the History was produced in the 18th century, while most researchers outside Soviet Ukraine were convinced the History had been written after 1800. Due to Cold War tensions and ideological restrictions, researchers in Soviet Ukraine could hardly make contact with Western and émigré researchers outside, or get access to their publications; even if they could, they ran the risk of persecution by the Soviet authorities.

According to Zenon Kohut (2003), the author of the manuscript was strongly influenced by the events that had taken place after the Third Partition of Poland (1795).

Serhii Plokhy (2012) concluded that the "paltry little history textbook", which the author of the History took offence with in the introduction (due to the textbook's suggestion that Polish kings had at times been an important factor in establishing cities and settling regions in Ukraine), was the Short History of Russia for the Use of Young People, written by Maksym Berlynskyi in 1800.

=== Linguistic and literary aspects ===
Yurii Shevelov, professor of Slavic Linguistics ast Columbia University in New York, did linguistic and literary analysis on the History of the Rus' in the 1960s and 1970s, concluding that the language of the text was not so much "Russian" as it was the written language of the educated Ukrainian elite: a mixture of literary Ukrainian, Church Slavonic and early Russian, replete with Ukrainisms. His survey of mostly French loanwords in the History compared with first occurrences of individual foreign words in Russian dictionaries of the era, led Shevelov to conclude that the History could have been written in the 1790s or early 1800s, noting that the author had great knowledge of French, as well as Russian military vocabulary. Shevelov further compared the occurrences of names of legendary personages in the History such as Gromval, Rogdai, and Turnylo/Turn, most of which did not appear in Russian literature until the year 1809. In 1996, Chernihiv historian Oleksandr Ilin added that the reference to the fable of the wolf and the lamb in the History (Note: According to the fable, a wolf accuses a lamb of interfering with his drinking when the lamb takes a drink twenty steps downstream from him. This fable was originally written by Ancient Greek storyteller Aesop, and then popularised by French poet Jean de La Fontaine in the 17th century.) almost certainly had to have been inspired by Ivan Krylov's Russian version of the fable, first published in 1808, and then included in his 1809 collection, after which the wolf-lamb fable suddenly became particularly popular in the Russian Empire.

== Publications ==
- (in Russian) «Исторія Русовъ, или Малой Россіи». Moscow: Moscow University press, 1846. (editio princeps). Edited by Osip Bodyansky. Ascribed to Georgy Konissky (Г. Конискій).
- (in Ukrainian) «Історія Русів». Kyiv: Veselka (Веселка), 2003. Ukrainian translation by Ivan Drach.

== See also ==
- Eyewitness Chronicle
- Hrabianka Chronicle
- Huklyv Chronicle
- Hustyn Chronicle
- Samiilo Velychko Chronicle

== Bibliography ==
- Lastovsjkyj, Valeriy (30 December 2024). "Теоретичні уявлення про міжнародні відносини і дипломатію автора «Історії русів» (початок ХІХ ст.)" [Theoretical ideas about international relations and diplomacy of the author of the 'History of the Ruthenians' (early 19th century)]. Міжнародні відносини: теоретико-практичні аспекти (in Ukrainian) (14): 59–69. doi:10.31866/2616-745X.14.2024.319352. ISSN 2616-7794.
- Plokhy, Serhii (2012). The Cossack Myth: History and Nationhood in the Age of Empires. Cambridge: Cambridge University Press. p. 503. ISBN 9781139540162. (A monograph entirely dedicated to examining the History of the Ruthenians manuscript tradition).
- Sysyn, Frank E. (1990). "The Cossack Chronicles and the Development of Modern Ukrainian Culture and National Identity". Harvard Ukrainian Studies. 14 (3/4). Harvard Ukrainian Research Institute: 593–607. ISSN 0363-5570. JSTOR 41036403.
