= Osip Bodyansky =

Ukrainian writer

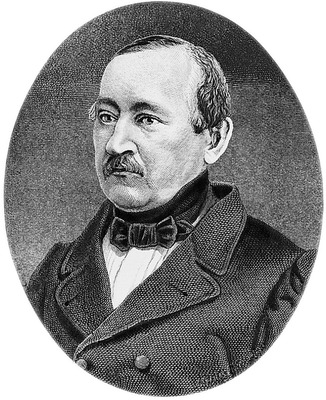
- Portrait, 1878
- Born: 31 October 1808; Varva, Poltava Governorate, Russian Empire
- Died: 6 September 1877 (aged 68); Moscow, Russian Empire
- Education: Doctor of Science (1855); Corresponding Member of the Russian Academy of Sciences
- Alma mater: Imperial Moscow University (1834)
- Scientific career
- Fields: Philology, history
- Workplaces: Imperial Moscow University
- Thesis: On the time of origin of the Slavonic script

Osip Maksimovich Bodyansky (Russian: Осип Максимович Бодянский; Ukrainian: Осип Максимович Бодянський, romanized: Osyp Maksymovych Bodianskyi; 31 October 1808 – 6 September 1877) was a Russian Slavist of Ukrainian Cossack descent who studied and taught at the Imperial Moscow University. Bodyansky's close friends included Nikolai Gogol, Sergey Aksakov, Mikhail Katkov, Taras Shevchenko, Mikhail Maksimovich and Pavel Jozef Šafárik. He was elected a corresponding member of the Imperial Academy of Sciences (Saint Petersburg) in 1854.

== Biography ==
Bodyansky was born in the old Ruthenian town of Varva in Poltava Governorate (today Chernihiv Oblast) and later the Pereyaslav Seminary. He, as a student in Moscow, entered Stankevich's circle of intellectuals. After getting his master's degree, he was at work rummaging obscure libraries and archives of Little Russia. Such activities brought to light a splattering of important documents, such as the illustrated Peresopnytsia Gospel and the History of Ruthenians or Little Russia which is considered controversial in Russia.

Bodyansky's publication of Giles Fletcher's sketch of Muscovy was deemed an act of Russophobia and incurred the displeasure of Tsar Nicholas I, leading to the scholar's departure from Moscow to Kazan. In his 30s, Bodyansky travelled in the Slavic countries on behalf of the Russian government, in order to study their languages, literature, and societies. Having for long moved in Slavophile and Pan-Slavist circles, he spent some time working in Prague with Šafárik. Upon his return he became professor in Moscow, where he died in 1878. His tomb is in the Novodevichy Convent.

Bodyansky was one of the first serious scholars of the Ukrainian language and wrote some amateur poetry in his native tongue. His master's dissertation involved a comparison of Ukrainian and Russian folks songs. Bodyansky's chief work was editing the Treatises of the Moscow Society for Russian History and Antiquities (1846–49 and 1858–78). Of his own works, notable are On the Folk Poetry of the Slavic Tribes (1837) and On the Time of Origin of the Slavic Script (1855).

== Manuscripts published ==
- 1830s: Peresopnytsia Gospel
- 1846: History of the Ruthenians, or Little Russia (Istoriya Rusiv)
- 1846: Eyewitness Chronicle, with the Short Description of Little Russia (Kratkoe opisanie Malorossii) as an appendix
- 1847: The History of the Zaporizhian Cossacks (originally written by Semen Ivanovych Myshetsky in the 1740s)
- 1847: Chronicle Narrative of Little Russia (Church Slavonic: Лѣтописное повѣствованіе о Малой Россіи; Alexander Rigelman, 1787)
- 1848: The Story of What Happened in Ukraine (Povest' o tom, chto sluchilos' na Ukraine; 18th century)
- 1848: Russian translation of Of the Russe Common Wealth (originally written in 1591 in English by Giles Fletcher, the Elder)
- 1850s: Hrabianka Chronicle
- 1858: Diariush ("Diary, Journal") written by the Ukrainian Cossack staff officer and statesman Mykola Khanenko in 1722
- 1875: Register of the Entire Zaporozhian Host (Reestra vsego Voiska Zaporozhskogo), published in 1875, from 1649
- Izbornik of Svyatoslav (1073), Old East Slavic miscellany
- South Slavic Monuments of the 15th Century, collection of critical ecclesiastical and state letters from the St. Ivan of Rila Monastery
- Moscow Councils Against Heretics of the 16th Century, compilation of original record manuscripts from the trials and religious synods held during the reign of tsar Ivan the Terrible

== Gallery ==
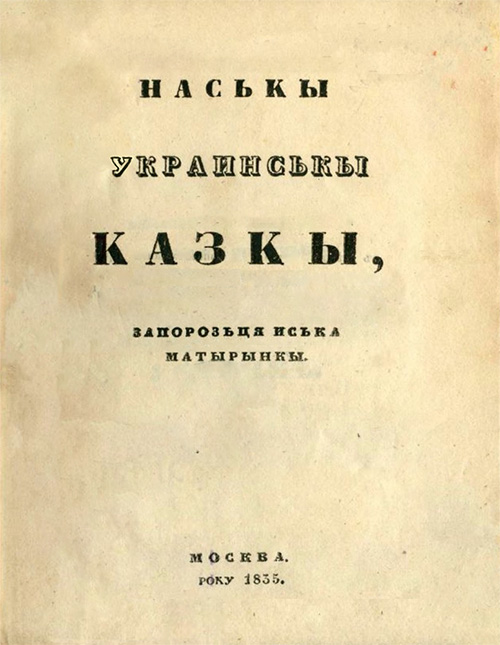
Cover page of "Ukrainian Fairy Tales" published by Bodiansky in Moscow in Ukrainian language using Russian orthography (alphabet)

== Bibliography ==
- Imperial Moscow University: 1755-1917: encyclopedic dictionary. Moscow: Russian political encyclopedia (ROSSPEN). 2010. pp. 88–89. ISBN 978-5-8243-1429-8 – via A. Andreev, D. Tsygankov.
