= Gerhard Friedrich Müller =

Russian-German historian and ethnologist (1705–1783)

- Фёдор Иванович Миллер
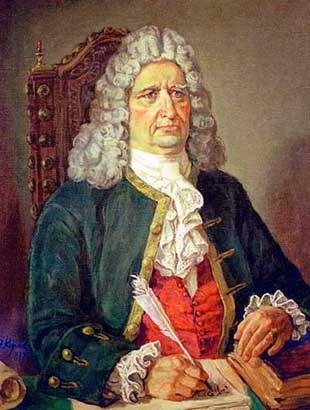
- Born: 29 October 1705; Herford, Holy Roman Empire
- Died: 22 October 1783 (aged 77); Moscow, Russian Empire
- Scientific career
- Fields: Archaeology, ethnology
- Institutions: Imperial Academy of Sciences; Royal Swedish Academy of Sciences

Gerhard Friedrich Müller (Russian: Фёдор Ива́нович Ми́ллер, romanized: Fyodor Ivanovich Miller; 29 October 1705 – 22 October [O.S. 11 October] 1783) was a Russian-German historian and pioneer ethnologist.

== Early life ==
Müller was born in Herford and educated at Leipzig. In 1725, he was invited to St. Petersburg to co-found the Imperial Academy of Sciences.

== Career ==
Müller participated in the second Kamchatka expedition, which reported on life and nature of the further (eastern) side of the Ural mountain range. From 1733 until 1743, nineteen scientists and artists traveled through Siberia to study people, cultures and collected data for the creation of maps. Müller, who described and categorized clothing, religions and rituals of the Siberian ethnic groups, is considered to be the father of ethnography.

On his return from Siberia, he became historiographer to the Russian Empire. He was one of the first historians to bring out a general account of Russian history based on an extensive examination of the documentary sources. By the 1750s, the secretary of the Imperial Academy of Sciences, Johann Daniel Schumacher, was delegating a significant portion of his managerial responsibilities to Müller, in which capacity he frequently corresponded with Leonhard Euler about scientific news and potential candidates for appointments at the academy. Müller's accentuation of the role of Scandinavians and Germans in the history of that country – a germ of the so-called Normanist theory – earned him enmity of Mikhail Lomonosov, who had previously supported his work, and dented his Russian career.

In the early 1760s, he rediscovered the 14th–15th century List of Russian Cities, Near and Far, after which his colleague August Ludwig von Schlözer published in Russian in 1816.

In 1766, after many attacks by his colleagues, Müller was appointed keeper of the national archives. He drew up for the government a collection of its treatises.

== Later life ==
In 1761, Müller was elected a foreign member of the Royal Swedish Academy of Sciences. He died, aged 77, in Moscow.

== Works ==
- Müller, Gerhard Friedrich (1760). "Von dem Ursprunge der Cosacken" [About the Origin of the Cossacks]. Sammlung Russischer Geschichte. Des vierten Bandes, Erstes u. zweytes Stück [Collection of Russian History. Volume 4, First and Second Part.] (in German). Saint Petersburg: Imperial Academy of Sciences. pp. 365–410.
- Müller, Gerhard Friedrich (1760). "Nachrichten von der Saporogischen Cosacken" [Reports on the Zaporizhian Cossacks]. Sammlung Russischer Geschichte. Des vierten Bandes, Erstes u. zweytes Stück [Collection of Russian History. Volume 4, First and Second Part.] (in German). Saint Petersburg: Imperial Academy of Sciences. pp. 411–472.

== See also ==
- The History of the Zaporizhian Cossacks (1740s), historical work written by Semen Ivanovych Myshetsky, which Müller made extensive use of
- List of Russian historians

== Bibliography ==
- "Миллер, Герард Фридрих" . Brockhaus and Efron Encyclopedic Dictionary (in Russian). 1906.
- Kerstin Holm, Stuttgarter Zeitung, No. 303 (29 December 2005), p. 38.
