= Novhorod-Siverskyi Chronicle =

- Новгород-Сіверський літопис
- Author(s): unknown
- Language: Literary Ukrainian (Late Ruthenian)
- Date: 1760s

The Novhorod-Siverskyi Chronicle (Ukrainian: Новгород-Сіверський літопис, romanized: Novhorod-Siversjkyj litopys) is a landmark work of Ukrainian historical thought from the second half of the 18th century. Its chronological scope covers the period from 706 to 1760. The work was written by an anonymous author in the 1760s. Its main theme is the history of Novhorod-Siverskyi, whilst also covering general Ukrainian events of the period in question.

== Description ==
The main sources used in compiling the text were the Brief Description of Little Russia, the Chronicle of European Sarmatia by Maciej Stryjkowski, 18th-century documentary materials, and the author’s own observations. The work begins with a description of events from the 8th to the 14th centuries, most of which are fictional — concerning the founding of Kyiv, the struggle between Prince Sviatoslav of Kyiv, Prince Lev of Volodymyr and Sultan Murdas — on the one hand, and Prince Rondolt of Novhorod-Siverskyi — on the other, the establishment of the Principality of Novhorod-Siverskyi, and so on.

From the 16th century onwards, the text covers events across Ukraine, but in a very concise chronicle-style format and often with inaccuracies in the facts and chronology. The author briefly mentions the events of 1648–57, the period of the Ruin. From 1685 onwards, the chronicle’s account of events becomes more detailed through the inclusion of extensive extracts from documents and detailed summaries of their contents: the hetman’s articles by Demian Mnohohrishny, Ivan Samoylovych and Ivan Mazepa, and the manifestos of Peter I of Russia.

Documents are used more extensively in the account of history after 1734. For the most part, these consist of reports from the theatre of operations during the Russo-Turkish War of 1735–1739, manifestos by Empress Elizabeth of Russia concerning the election of Kyrylo Rozumovsky as hetman, and a description of the hetman election. Considerable attention is paid to the description of events in the Polish–Lithuanian Commonwealth, Turkish–Persian relations in the 1730s, and the War of the Austrian Succession, waged by Prussia between 1740 and 1748. The text includes the author’s own observations, in particular regarding the ceremonial entry in 1751 of the newly elected hetman into Hlukhiv, the capital of the Cossack Hetmanate in Left-Bank Ukraine; Rozumovsky’s visit to Novhorod-Siverskyi in 1752; and the natural disasters that struck the town.

The Novhorod-Siverskyi Chronicle has not been published; it comprises 30 folios and forms part of a manuscript collection alongside documents from the second half of the 18th century. It is held in the Manuscripts Department of the Russian National Library in Saint Petersburg.

== Bibliography ==
- Bovhyrja, Andrii Markovych (2010). "Новгород-Сіверський літопис" [Novhorod-Siverskyi Chronicle]. Encyclopedia of History of Ukraine (in Ukrainian). Vol. 7. Kyiv: Institute of History of Ukraine. p. 448. Archived from the original on 28 June 2026.
- Отчет Императорской публичной библиотеки за 1899 год [Report of the Imperial Public Library for 1899]. (St Petersburg 1900).
- Bovhyrja, Andrii (2003). "«Новгород-Сіверський літопис» - пам'ятка української історіографії другої половини XVIII ст" [The ‘Novhorod-Siverskyi Chronicle’, a landmark work of Ukrainian historiography from the second half of the 18th century]. Сіверянський літопис / Siverjanskyj litopys (in Ukrainian) (4–5). Izbornyk.
