= Maksym Berlynskyi =

Ukrainian historian and archaeologist

- Максим Берлинський
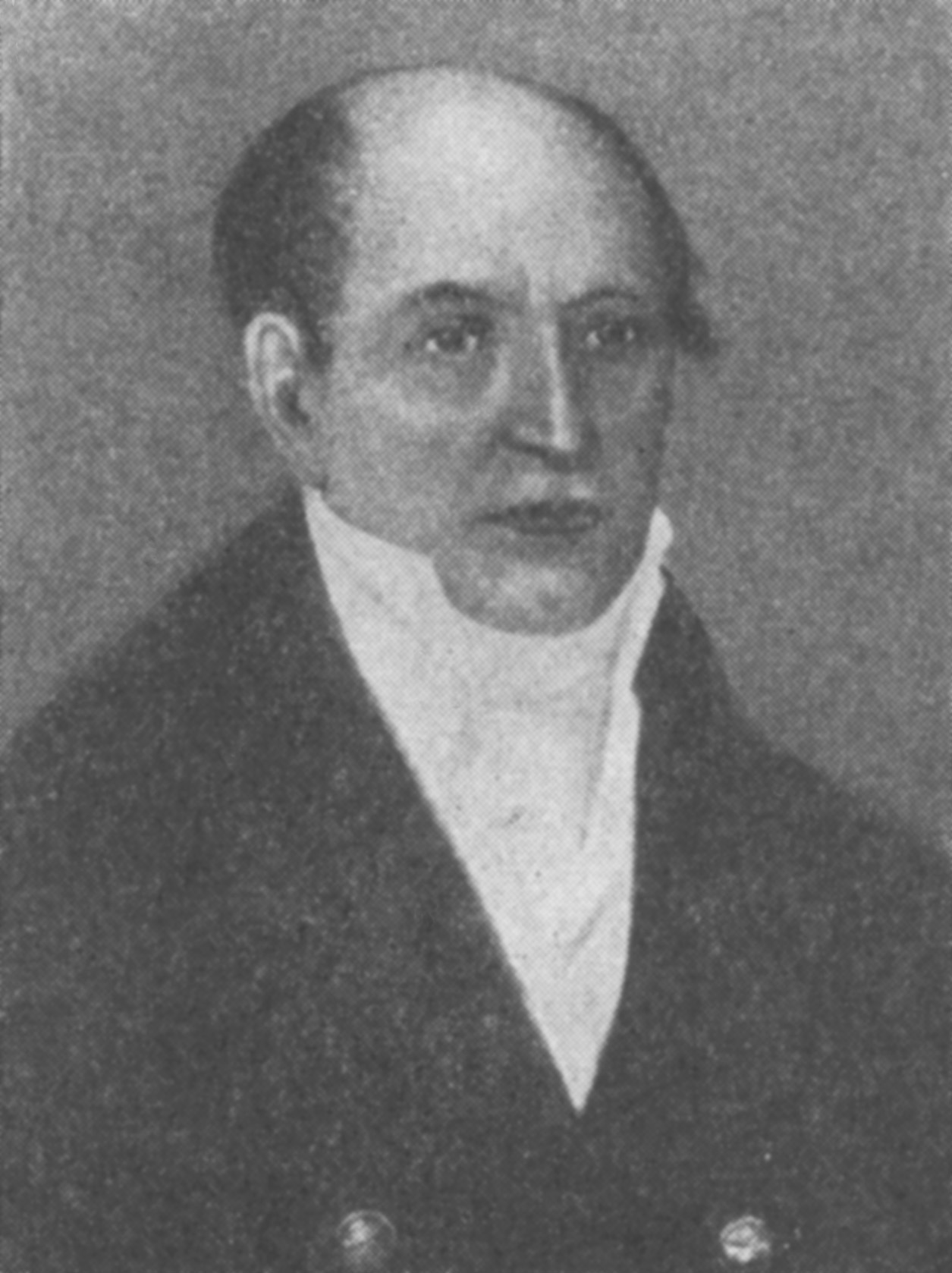
- Born: 1764
- Died: 1848 (aged 83–84)
- Occupations: Historian, archaeologist, educator
- Known for: Early studies of Kyiv history and archaeology

Maksym Fedorovych Berlynskyi (1764–1848) was a Ukrainian historian, archaeologist, and educator. He is regarded as one of the first researchers of the history and antiquities of Kyiv.

He was also involved in early archaeological and historical studies of the city.

== See also ==
- History of Kyiv
- Archaeology
- Historiography
