= Hrabianka Chronicle =

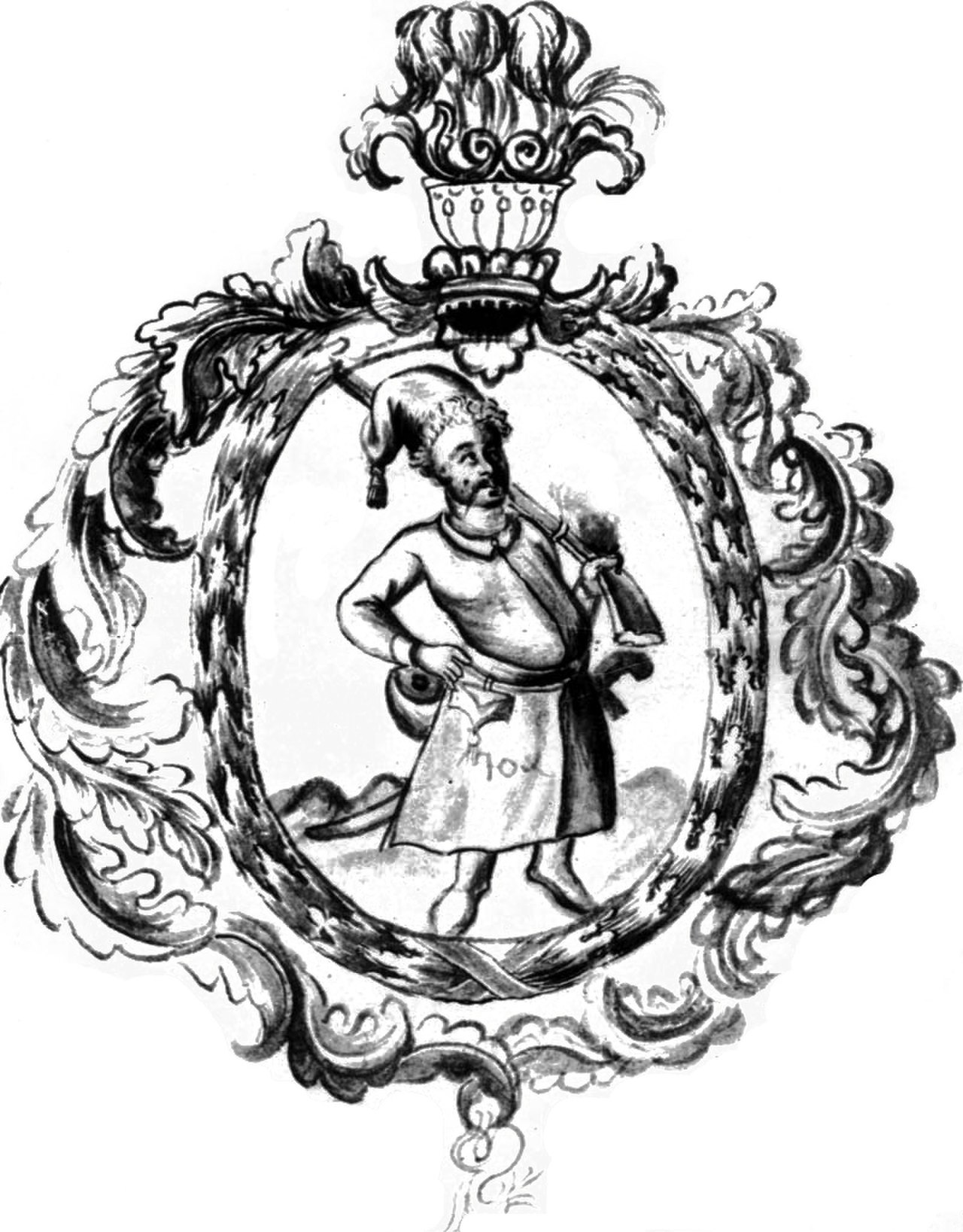
Coat of arms of the Zaporizhian Host as depicted in the Hrabianka Chronicle

The Hrabianka Chronicle, (Note: Ukrainian: Літопис Граб'янки, romanized: Litopys Hrabjanky, or more fully, Літопис гадяцького полковника Григорія Граб'янки, Litopys hadjacjkoho polkovnyka Hryhorija Hrabjanky, 'Chronicle of the Hadiach Colonel Hryhorij Hrabjanka'.) also known as the Deistviia, is a Cossack chronicle from the second half of the 17th century to the early 18th century, compiled by polkovnyk (colonel) Hryhorii Hrabianka, (Note: Ukrainian: Григорій Граб'янка, romanized: Hryhorij Hrabjanka.) who served in the Hadiach Regiment of the Cossack Hetmanate.

An abridged version of the Hrabianka Chronicle's text, with a continuation up to 1734, was later spread in the Brief Description of Little Russia. By 1777, this had become the most popular historical compendium of Ukraine in the Hetmanate.

== Provenance ==
=== Authorship ===
Hrabianka presumably wrote this work around 1710, and named it Diistviia prezil’noi i ot nachala poliakov krvavshoi nebyvaloi brani Bohdana Khmelnytskoho, hetmana Zaporozhskoho s poliaky ... ("The Events of the Most Bitter and the Most Bloody War since the Origin of the Poles between Bohdan Khmelnytsky, the Zaporozhian Hetman, and the Poles...").

Symon Narizhny and some other scholars have expressed doubts about Hryhorii Hrabianka's authorship of the chronicle. Many of the manuscripts do not attribute the text to any author at all, but the few that do name Hryhorii Hrabianka have been taken to be sufficiently authoritative by the majority of scholars, and to pinpoint the initial composition to the year 1709.

=== Manuscript circulation ===
All three texts of the "Cossack chronicles" (see below) kept circulating in manuscript form for about 100 years before anyone took the effort to print them, even though the printing press was introduced in Ukraine in the 16th century, and had already become widespread in the 17th century. Printing presses in Ukraine faced little central state control, but also had to do without a great amount of state resources dedicated to their operation. Secular printing stagnated in the late 17th and early 18th century, with the Hetmanate's administration not developing its own press, while tsar Peter restricted his presses to the Imperial Russian capitals of Saint Petersburg and Moscow; and ecclesiastical printing in the Cossack Hetmanate was concentrated in the Kyiv Pechersk Lavra, Chernihiv, and Novhorod-Siverskyi, and tightly controlled.

Therefore, much of 18th-century Ukrainian culture was restricted to manuscript transmission as the only practical way to distribute written texts. Something similar happened to the History of the Ruthenians (Istoriya Rusiv), probably written shortly after 1800, but circulating in manuscript form for decades before it finally got printed in 1846.

=== Publications ===
In 1793, an abridged version of the Hrabianka Chronicle was first published anonymously, under the title Лѣтописецъ Малыя Россіи, Litopysecj Malyja Rossij, 'The Chronicler of Little Russia', by Fedir Tumansky in the journal "Российский магазин" ("Russian Magazine"; parts 2 and 3). Tumansky added a glossary "Изъясненїе малороссїйскихъ реченїй" ("Explanation of Little Russian Sentences"), where 333 Ukrainian words are explained in Russian.

In 1854, the editio princeps of the chronicle was published by the Kyiv Archeographic Commission with six different manuscripts, including the most complete and oldest manuscript, copied in shorthand during the author's lifetime. The censored parts of the latter version were later published in Kievskaia starina ("Kyivan Antiquities"), volume 47 (1894). The Kyiv Commission was unaware of the obscure, abridged 1793 edition printed in Saint Petersburg.

In 1992, there were more than 40 manuscripts known to exist, stored in the Central Scientific Library of the Academy of Sciences of Ukraine (19), the Lenin Library (7), the Saltykov-Shchedrin Public Library in Saint Petersburg (7), the Chernihiv Historical Museum (2), the Historical Museum of the USSR, and others. Frank E. Sysyn stated in 1990: "The approximately fifty extant eighteenth-century manuscripts demonstrate that Hrabianka's work functioned as the primary historical work in the eighteenth-century Hetmanate."

== Description ==
=== Style ===
The Hrabianka Chronicle is one of the most outstanding monuments of Ukrainian historiographical prose of the late 17th and early 18th centuries. Together with the Eyewitness Chronicle and the Samiilo Velychko Chronicle, it has become known as the "Cossack chronicles." However, this name is rather arbitrary, as each of these works is a complex, multifaceted composition combining descriptions of historical figures, accounts of events – battles, uprisings, conspiracies, etc. – individual documents, and interpretations of various periods in the history of Ukraine, and is far removed from the traditional form of Rus' chronicles. Sysyn (1990) argued they are more properly called "histories" rather than chronicles. The style of the Hrabianka and Velychko chronicles was strongly influenced by the new Polish Renaissance historiography (modelled on classical histories), which sought to fully narrate the causes of events, and the motivations of peoples involved, rather than listing entries of events by year without further context, as traditional chronicle writing did.

In accordance with his task — to glorify Bohdan Khmelnytsky and his era — Hrabianka wrote the work in a complex style, modelled on the Church Slavonic Ukrainian literary language of the time, rather than the Ruthenian language (Chancery Slavonic) predominantly used in administration, business and other domains of daily life, which more closely resembled the spoken language in contemporary Ukraine and Belarus. By archaising the language, the author sought to achieve a lofty, empathic style of narration, which nevertheless contained elements of the vernacular.

The text advocates for the autonomy of the Ukrainian Cossacks, and condemns the Russian voivodes who restricted the political rights of Ukraine.

=== Contents ===
The Chronicle of Hryhorii Hrabianka describes the history from the emergence of the Cossacks to 1709. The narrative attempts to trace the origins of the Cossacks and Little Rus' all the way back to biblical times. Special effort is made to connect the Cossacks to the Khazars, but the focus of the work is a narrative literary history of the age of Bohdan Khmelnytskyi. After the latter's death in 1657, the text becomes laconic, and transforms into a list of chronicle entries from 1664 onwards. The Deistviia contains many state documents, hetman decrees, acts, and letters.

Hrabianka's work is largely compilatory. Among his main sources, the author cites the memoirs of contemporaries of the events, as well as the works of domestic and foreign historians. Hrabianka made the most use of:

- the Eyewitness Chronicle;
- the Kievan Synopsis, which was first published in 1674, and served as a kind of history textbook for a long time and went through about 30 editions;
- the Latin work Annales Poloniae ab obitu Vladislai IV by Wespazjan Kochowski, the official historiographer of the Polish kings, three volumes of which were published in Kraków in 1683, 1688 and 1698; and
- especially the poem "Civil War" by the Pole Samuel Twardowski, published in Kalisz in 1681.

In addition, Hrabianka refers to the works of Martin Cromer, Marcin Bielski's Kronika Swiata ("Universal Chronicle", 1564) and his son Joachim Bielski's Kronika Polska ("Chronicle of Poland", 1597), Maciej Stryjkowski's Chronicle of Poland, Lithuania, Samogitia and all of Ruthenia (1582), Alexander Guagnini, Samuel von Pufendorf and Johann Gibner. However, the Deistviia is not a simple mechanical compilation of information taken from various sources. It is an independent work in which the author's distinctive style is clearly evident.

== Bibliography ==
Ukrainian Wikiquote has quotations related to: Літопис Григорія Грабянки

=== Critical editions ===
- Hrabianka, Hrihorii (1992). Літопис гадяцького полковника Григорія Грабянки [The Chronicle of Hadiach Colonel Hryhorii Hrabianka] (in Ukrainian). Translated by Roman Hryhorovych Ivanchenko. Kyiv: Znannja Society of Ukraine / Izbornyk. p. 192. ISBN 5-7770-0599-3.
- "Літопис Григорія Грабянки (Уривки)" [The Chronicle of Hryhorii Hrabianka (Excerpts)]. Українська література XVIII ст. Поетичні твори, драматичні твори, прозові твори [18th-century Ukrainian literature. Poetry, drama and prose] (in Ukrainian). Kyiv: Naukova Dumka. 1983. pp. 446–478.

=== Literature ===
Mytsyk, Yuri Andriyovych (1999). "Невідома редакція «Короткого опису Малоросії»" [Unknown edition of "Brief Description of Little Russia"]. Історіографічні дослідження в Україні / Historiographical studies in Ukraine, 1968–2020 (7). Institute of History of Ukraine: 133–154.

- Ohloblyn, Oleksander (1988). "Hrabianka, Hryhorii". Encyclopedia of Ukraine. Vol. 2. Canadian Institute of Ukrainian Studies.
- Plokhy, Serhii (2012). The Cossack Myth: History and Nationhood in the Age of Empires. Cambridge: Cambridge University Press. p. 503. ISBN 9781139540162. (A monograph entirely dedicated to examining the History of the Ruthenians manuscript tradition).
- Sas, Petro Mykhailovych (2004). "Григорій Іванович і його літопис української історії та історії козацтва" [Hryhorij Ivanovych Hrabjanka and his chronicle of Ukrainian history and Cossack history]. Encyclopedia of History of Ukraine (in Ukrainian). Vol. 2. Kyiv: Institute of History of Ukraine. p. 688.
- Sysyn, Frank E. (1990). "The Cossack Chronicles and the Development of Modern Ukrainian Culture and National Identity". Harvard Ukrainian Studies. 14 (3/4). Harvard Ukrainian Research Institute: 593–607. ISSN 0363-5570. JSTOR 41036403.
- Літопис Грабянки // Збірник козацьких літописів: Густинський, Самійла Величка, Грабянки / [упоряд. та пер.: Volodymyr Ivanovych Krekoten та ін.]. — Kyiv: Dnipro, 2006. — 976 с. — ISBN 966-578-147-2
- Літопис Граб'янки (про нього) — на сайті «Культура України»
- Yu. Lutsenko. Григорій Грабянка і його літопис / Petro Vasyljovych Bilous, Українська література XI—XVIII ст.: навч. посіб. для самостійної роботи студента / П. В. Білоус, О. П. Білоус. — Kyiv: Publishing house Akademija, 2010. — С. 144.
