= Chernihiv Chronicle =

The Chernihiv Chronicle (Note: Ukrainian: Чернігівський літопис, romanized: Chernihivsjkyj litopys. Russian: Черниговская летопись, romanized: Chernigovskaya letopis'.) is a provisional title for a work of Cossack chronicle writing from the 17th–18th centuries. It is also known by its incipit: "What was happening in the Rus' and Polish lands, and in which year of the Christian era". (Note: Ukrainian: Що ся в руских и полских странах діяло і якого от Рождества Христова року.) It has survived in four manuscripts. The work recounts events in Ukrainian history from 1587 to 1768—including the Cossack-peasant uprisings of the 16th–17th centuries, the Khmelnytsky Uprising and The Ruin, depicts the most famous historical figures, describes natural disasters, epidemics and so on.

== Description ==
In terms of its narrative style, tone and language, the Chernihiv Chronicle bears a close resemblance to the Eyewitness Chronicle.

Researchers identify two editions.

- The first edition includes
  - the Bilozersky manuscript (incomplete, ending in 1652); and
  - the Avksenty manuscript (1587–1750, with the exception of 1704–28)
- The second edition includes
  - the Persidsky manuscript (1587–1725); and
  - the Kyiv manuscript (1497–1764).

The second edition is far more valuable and extensive. Scholar M. Bilozersky published the chronicle based on manuscripts of the first edition. O. Lazarevsky, who published the chronicle based on Persidsky's copy, believed that the chronicle was compiled in Chernihiv, presumably by Leontiy Bobolinsky.

Both versions share a common section from 1497 (1587) to 1704, but there are discrepancies and insertions. The author of the common section drew on the third part of F. Sofonovych’s chronicle, I. Halyatovsky’s Skarbnytsa (1676), the draft manuscript of the Ostroh Chronicle, his own recollections, and eyewitness accounts. The common section of the first edition, covering the events of 1729–50, was supplemented by Ivan Yanushkevych-Butenko, a clerk of the Chernihiv Regiment (1715–27), a person close to Pavlo Polubotok. He undertook a task no less extensive than that of his predecessor, making extensive use of oral and written sources, such as ‘P. Polubotok’s chronicle’.

The chronicle provides an overview of the military, political and ecclesiastical history of Ukraine in the 16th–18th centuries. The monument expresses sympathy for Hetman Bohdan Khmelnytsky, Acting Hetman Yakym Somko, the Cossack kish otaman Ivan Sirko, the Polish king John II Casimir Vasa and a negative attitude towards the hetmans Ivan Briukhovetskyi and Ivan Samoilovych. The chronicle contains a great deal of original information, for example, regarding the uprising in Lubny in 1632.

== Тexts ==
- "The Chernihiv Chronicle". Izbornyk (in Ukrainian). Archived from the original on 19 June 2008.

== Sources ==
- Mytsyk, Yuri Andriyovych (2013). "Чернігівський літопис" [Chernihiv Chronicle]. Encyclopedia of History of Ukraine (in Ukrainian). Vol. 10. Kyiv: Institute of History of Ukraine. p. 524. Archived from the original on 29 May 2026. ("pdf version (page 524)" (PDF). Archived from the original (PDF) on 13 March 2016.)
- Апанович О. Ще одне джерело з історії України XVIII сторіччя / Олена Апанович // Україна. [Olena Apanovych, Another source on the history of 18th-century Ukraine. Ukraine.] Science and Culture: Yearbook / Academy of Sciences of the Ukrainian SSR, ‘Znannya’ Publishing House of the Ukrainian SSR. Kyiv: Znannya, 1989. No. 23. pp. 213–231.
