= Orest Levytsky =

Ukrainian historian and writer (1848–1922)

- Орест Левицький
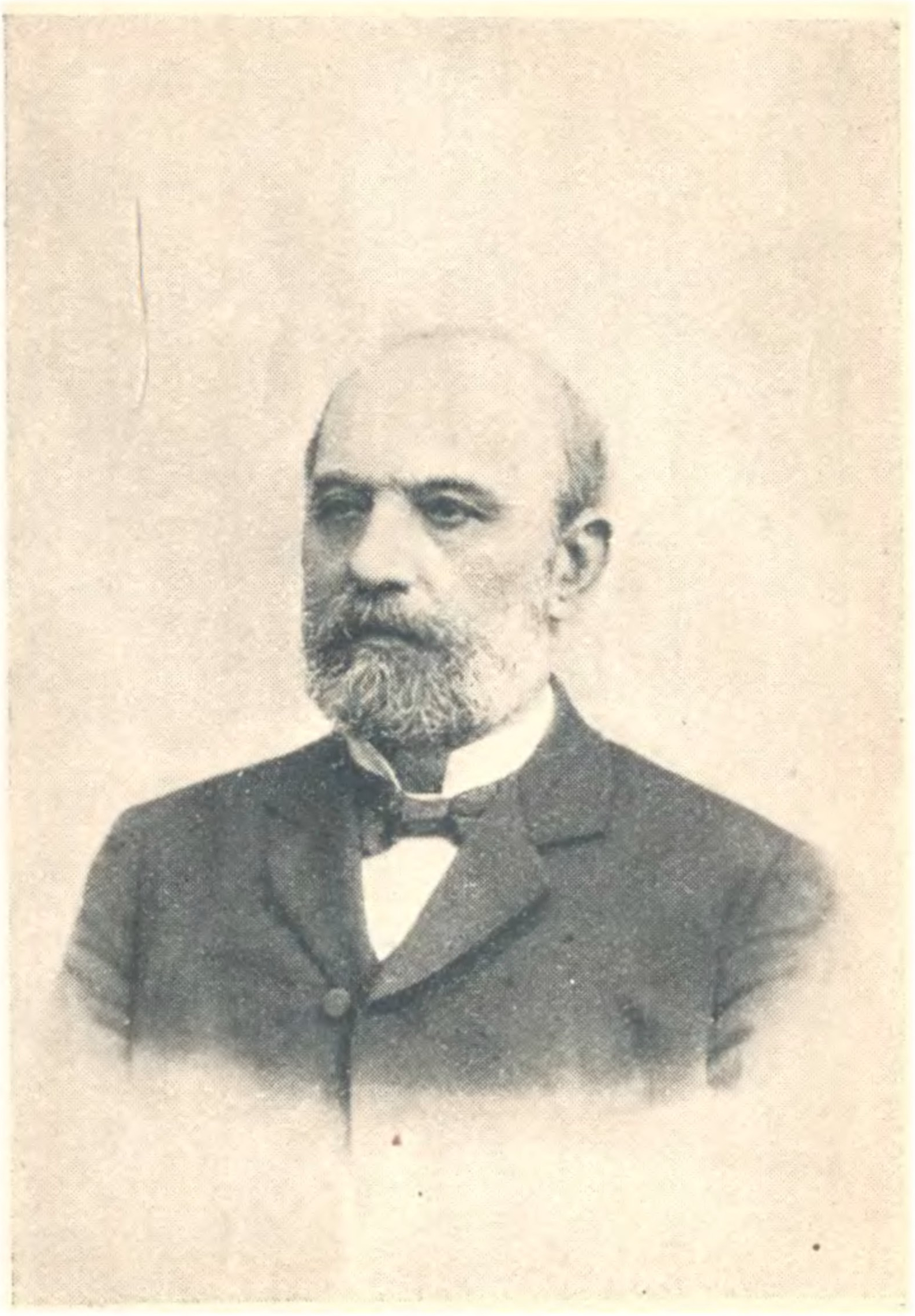
- Born: 25 December 1848; Mayachka, Poltava Governorate, Imperial Russia
- Died: 9 May 1922 (aged 73); Drabiv, Poltava Governorate, Ukrainian SSR
- Occupation: Historian

Academic background
- Education: Kiev University; Poltava Theological Seminary
- Thesis: Overview of the internal history of Little Russia in the second half of the 17th century (1874)
- Doctoral advisor: Volodymyr Antonovych

Academic work
- Discipline: History of Ukraine
- Institutions: Kiev University

Orest Ivanovych Levytsky (Ukrainian: О́рест Іва́нович Леви́цький; 25 December [O.S. 13 December] 1848 – 9 May 1922) was a Ukrainian historian, ethnographer, and writer. He was a member of Kiev Hromada (Hromada), an editor of Kievan Past, and a Russian language philologist.

== Biography ==
Born near Poltava, in Mayachka village, into the family of a priest, Levytsky graduated from the Poltava Divinity School and Seminary in 1869. In 1869-1870 he worked as a private teacher in the village Vepryk (near Hadiach). As the best student, Levytsky was referred to be studied at a theological academy but unexpectedly enrolled into the Law faculty of Kiev University. Later he transferred to the History and Philology faculty, from which he graduated in 1874. Led by Volodymyr Antonovych, in 1874 Levytsky defended his dissertation "Overview of the internal history of Little Russia in the second half of 17th century".

In 1874-1921 Levytsky was a secretary of the Provisional Commission in reviewing of old acts while teaching Russian language (1874–1909) in the Fourth Kiev Gymnasium and geography (1876–1877) in a music school. In 1879-87 he was a chief deputy of the Kiev Central Archive. He was one of the founders of the National Academy of Sciences of Ukraine where he worked as a secretary from 1918 to 1920 and head of the Department of Social and Economical Sciences.

== Awards ==
- Order of Saint Vladimir (1886)

== Selected works ==
- Afanasiy Filippovich, Hegumen of Brest-Litovsk and his actions in protection of Orthodox Church against Unia Church (Афанасий Филиппович, игумен Брестлитовский, и его деятельность в защиту православия против унии, 1878)
- Socinianism in Poland and South-Western Russia in 16-17th centuries (Социнианство в Польше и Юго-Западной Руси в XVI и XVII веках, 1882)
- Anna-Aloise, the Princess of Ostroh (Анна-Алоиза, княжна Острожская, 1883)
- Internal affairs of Western Russian Church in the Polish-Lithuanian Commonwealth in the end of 16th century and the Union of Brest (Внутреннее состояние западно-русской церкви в Польско-Литовском государстве в конце XVI в. и уния (Из предисл. к 6 т. 1 ч. «Арх. Юго-зап. России»), 1884)
- Cyril Terlecki, episcope of Lutsk and Ostroh (Кирилл Терлецкий, епископ Луцкий и Острожский, 1885)
- Hypati Pociej, Metropolitan episcope of Kiev (Ипатий Потей, киевский униатский митрополит, 1885)
- Hanna Montowt. Historical outline of the life of Volhynian nobility in 16th century (Ганна Монтовт. Ист.-бытовой очерк из жизни волынского дворянства в XVI в., 1888)
- Outline of the old life of Volhynia and Ukraine. Issues 1-2 (Очерки старинного быта Волыни и Украины. Вып. 1–2, 1889–1891)
- Archaeological excursions of Taras Shevchenko in 1845-1856 (Археологические экскурсии Т. Г. Шевченко в 1845—1856 гг., 1894)

== Bibliography ==
- Levytsky, O. About the courts of Cossack Hetmanate. "Rukh". Kharkiv. (translated by Mykola Horban)

Preceded by Volodymyr Vernadsky	President of NANU; 1919–1922	Succeeded by Volodymyr Lipsky
