= Lviv Chronicle =

Ruthenian chronicle

1971 critical edition of the Lviv Chronicle by Oleksandr A. Bevzo

The Lviv Chronicle (Ukrainian: Львівський літопис) is a Ruthenian chronicle from Halychyna, written in the early 17th century. It is named after the city of Lviv, where its manuscript was found.

== Contents ==
=== Topics ===
This chronicle reflects the events in post-Kievan Rus' from year 1498 to 1649, revealing valuable information about the political and economic conditions of the Ukrainian lands, with a focus on Halychyna, Podolia and the regions around Kyiv and Pereiaslav. Moreover, it provides news on Ukraine's relations with other polities, such as Poland, Moscow, and the Crimean Khanate. It describes such events as the Crimean Tatar raids, imposition of Catholicism in Western Ukraine by Uniate clergy and nobility, the Ukrainian Cossack rebellion of the 1630s, and the Khmelnytsky Uprising (1648—1654). It mentions a number of unique stories from Ukrainian history that are not available from any other source.

=== Structure ===
The text is divided into three unequal and markedly distinct sections.

- The first part of the chronicle (from 1498 to 1591) takes the form of a chronological grid, into which it was evidently intended to record the most significant events of each year. In this part of the chronicle, the author managed to record information for only twenty-eight of the ninety-four years. Here, there are dry, brief entries about individual events for the respective years.
- In the second part of the chronicle (from 1592 to 1618), brief entries are interspersed with more detailed accounts of events. However, the author does not yet describe these events as an eyewitness.
- In the third part of the chronicle, covering the years 1619–1649, with a few exceptions, each year is accompanied by a fairly detailed account of events, containing valuable details and facts about the situation in Ukraine during those years. From the autobiographical entry for 1621, it has been argued that the chronicler was not only a contemporary but, possibly, also a participant in the events of that year and the years that followed that are described in his chronicle. In this part of the chronicle, there are already reports of local events of both a historical and everyday nature.

== Authorship ==
Scan from the Lviv manuscript

The text is anonymous. According to Luznycky (1961), the author was a member of the poor, lesser Ruthenian nobility, working as an official clerk at the court. The author displays a Tendenz of Ukrainian Cossack patriotism, and a mixture of monarchism in favour of the hetmanship, as well as democracy, comradeship and friendship with fellow Cossacks.

Out of 12 instances in which the territory of Ukraine is mentioned, the author of the Lviv Chronicle used the term "Ukraine" on 9 occasions (first in 1630). From 1648 onwards, he used the term "Zaporizhian Host" on only 3 occasions; this term referred both to the territory of Ukraine and to the Cossack military organisation.

== Provenance ==
The first manuscript containing the text of the Lviv Chronicle was discovered in Lviv in the beginning of 19th century by the Western Ukrainian Russophile historian Denis Zubrytsky. The manuscript of the Chronicle was kept at the Stauropegion Institute and is now stored in the Central Scientific Library of the National Academy of Sciences of Ukraine in Kyiv, Ukraine.

It was first published in Moscow in 1839 by the Russian historian Mikhail Pogodin and later published in Lviv in the 1870s. The Etterov copy of the Lviv Chronicle (GPB F.IV.144) is stored in the Russian State Library.

== Sources ==
- Luznycky, Gregory (1961). Ukrainian Literature Within the Framework of World Literature: A Short Outline of Ukrainian Literature from Renaissance to Romanticism (PDF). Philadelphia: "America" Publishing House. p. 77.
- (in Ukrainian) Гайдай Л. Історія України в особах, термінах, назвах і поняттях. — Луцьк: Вежа, 2000.
- (in Ukrainian) Довідник з історії України. За ред. І. Підкови та Р. Шуста. — К.: Генеза, 1993.
- (in Ukrainian) Bevzo, Oleksandr A. (1971). Львівський літопис і Острозький літописець: Джерелознавче дослідження [The Lviv Chronicle and the Ostroh Chronicler: A Source Study]. Kyiv: Naukova Dumka. The original text of the Lviv Chronicle in modern Ukrainian orthography.
