= Huklyv Chronicle =

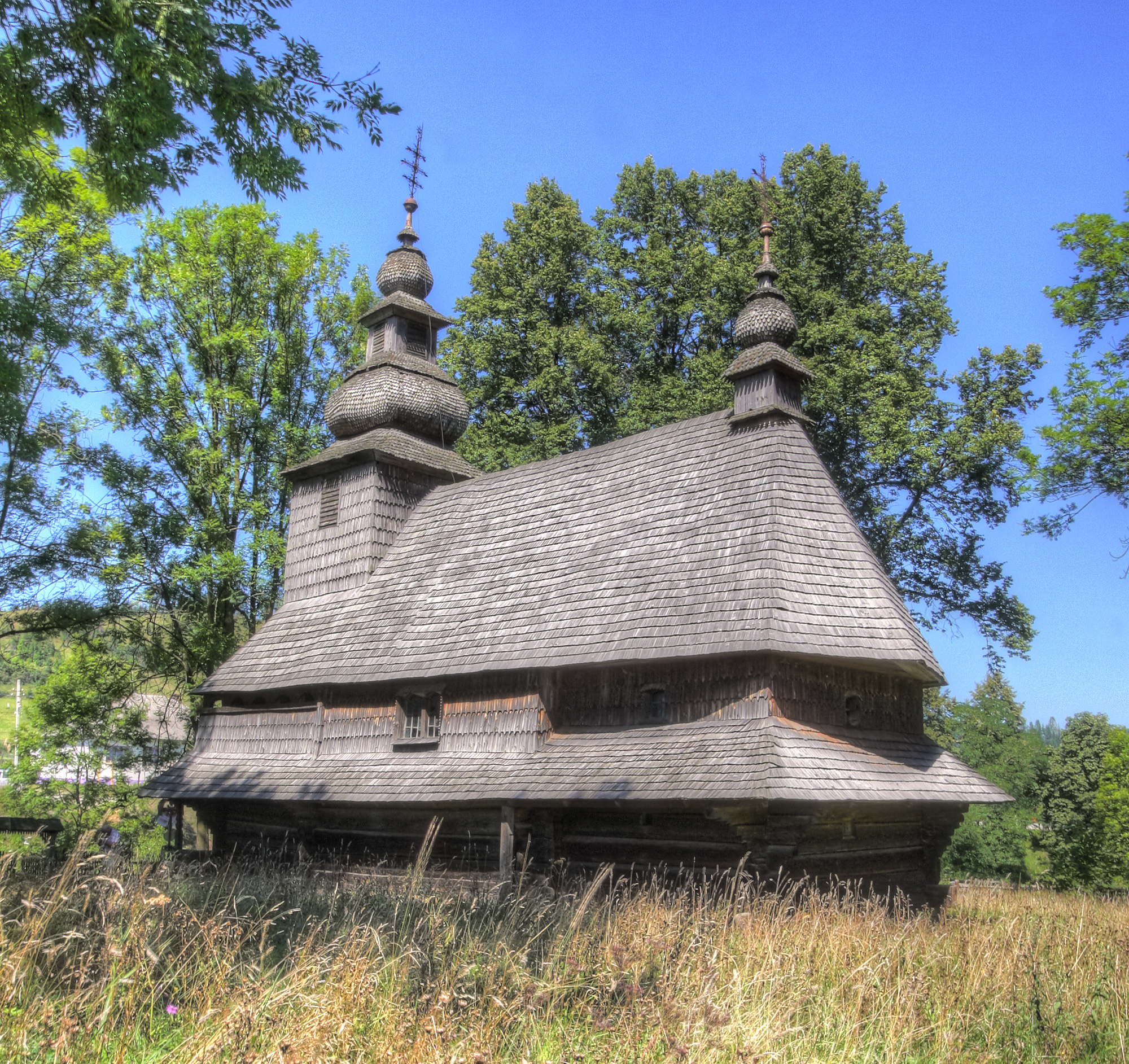
Holy Spirit Church in Huklyvyi

The Huklyv, Huklyvyi or Huklyvsky Chronicle (Note: Ukrainian: Гукливський літопис, romanized: Huklyvsjkyj litopys, or Лїтопись Гукливська, Litopys Huklyvsjka.) is a Transcarpathian (Zakarpattian) chronicle describing events from 1660 (according to other sources, from 1666) until around 1812. It was written in the Holy Spirit Church, a unique wooden church with a bell tower near the village of Huklyvyi in the Mukachevo Raion of Zakarpattia Oblast in present-day Ukraine.

== Description ==
In 1787, throughout Hungary, there was a great famine and disease, with a third of the people dying from typhus and hunger because they ate harmful grass. That year... [har]vest was average, and the summer was good, but people sowed very little, and the following year, the famine in the Verkhovyna region was even worse, so besides weeds and straw, people bought grain from Jews, boiled it into jelly, and consumed it.

— Huklyvsky Chronicle

This early modern chronicle, also known by its incipit "The Latest, Which Happened When" («Новєйшая, яжє когда случишася»), was written by priests over a period of 123 years. Father Mykhailo Hryhasy left the most notes. Most of the text of the chronicle consists of information about the weather, harvests, and important local events, such as famine caused by a harsh winter.

Interestingly, nowhere in the chronicle is the word "Carpathians" («Карпати») used, only "Beskyd" («Бескид», «БескЂдъ»), a reference to the Beskid Mountains. From this, researchers hypothesise that the name Beskyd is the original, folk name, and that the name "Carpathians" came into the Ukrainian language from the Hungarians.

== Sources ==
- Ya. Bilenjkyj (Hijador Strypsjkyj) (1911). Угроруські літописні записки // Записки Наукового товариства імені Шевченка [Ugro-Rusyn chronicle notes : Notes of the Shevchenko Scientific Society. Volume 104. Book 4.] (in Ukrainian). Shevchenko Scientific Society / Izbornyk. pp. 73–82. Archived from the original on 21 July 2015.
- Pavlovska, Solomiia Y. (29 September 2023). "Reinterpretation of Ukrainian apocryphal literature in chronotope". COMPASS. 3 (1): 89–102. doi:10.29173/comp65. ISSN 2371-6096.
