= Antonovych prize =

Ukrainian literary award

The Antonovych Prize is an annual award of US$10,000 given by the Omelian and Tetiana Antonovych Foundation, since 1981 for literary works written in Ukrainian and for research in Ukrainian studies. Institutions, individuals, and members of the prize jury can make nominations, but only the jury decides the winners. Laureates are asked to give a speech at an award ceremony.

== Laureates ==
- 2020 – Svoboda, Ukrainian newspaper
- 2019 – Alexander J. Motyl, American political scientist and writer
- 2018 – Yuriy Shcherbak, Ukrainian writer
- 2017 – Anne Applebaum, American journalist
- 2016 – Bohdan Prakh, Polish-Ukrainian church historian
- 2015 – Serhii Plokhy, Ukrainian-American historian
- 2014 – Timothy Snyder, American historian
- 2013 – Leonid Finberg, Ukrainian sociologist, publisher
- 2012 – Zenon Kohut, Canadian historian; Frank Sysyn, Canadian historian
- 2011 – Andrea Graziosi, Italian historian; Stanislav Kultsytskyi, Ukrainian historian
- 2010 – Aleksandra Hnatiuk, Polish slavist; Bogumiła Berdychowska, Polish writer and journalist
- 2009 – Liubomyr Vynar, Ukrainian-American historian; Oksana Zabuzhko, Ukrainian writer
- 2008 – George G. Grabowicz, American literature scholar; Andriy Dzhul
- 2007 – Yaroslav Hrytsak, Ukrainian historian
- 2006 – Borys Gudziak, Eparch of the Ukrainian Catholic Eparchy of Saint Vladimir the Great of Paris
- 2005 – not awarded
- 2004 – Andriy Sodomora, Ukrainian translator and writer; Dmytro Pavlychko, Ukrainian poet
- 2003 – Mykola Riabchuk, Ukrainian political analyst; Roman Ivanychuk, Ukraininan writer
- 2002 – Yuriy Shapoval, Ukrainian historian; Hryhoriy Huseynov, Ukrainian writer; Yaroslav Isayevych, Ukrainian historian
- 2001 – Yurii Andrukhovych, Ukrainian writer; Michael Hamm, Ameriacan historian; Roman Szporluk, American historian
- 2000 – Yuriy Badzyo, Ukrainian literature scholar
- 1999 – Ihor Ševčenko, Ukrainian-American philologist and historian
- 1998 – Yuriy Barabash, Ukrainian literature scholar; George S. N. Luckyj, Ukrainian-American literature scholar
- 1997 – Dmytro Stepovyk, Ukrainian art scholar; Ihor Kalynets, Ukrainian poet and Soviet dissident
- 1996 – Bohdan Bociurkiw, Canadian-Ukrainian historian; Hryhoriy Lohvyn, Ukrainian art scholar and architect; Yuriy Mushketyk, Ukrainian writer
- 1995 – Mykhailyna Kotsiubynska, Ukrainian literature scholar; Vyacheslav Bryukhovetskyi, Ukrainian literature scholar; Roman Fedoriv, Ukrainian writer
- 1994 – Olena Apanovych, Ukrainian historian; Yevhen Hutsalo, Ukrainian writer
- 1993 – Mykola Zhulynskyi, Ukrainian literature scholar; Yaroslav Dashkevych, Ukrainian historian; Mykola Vinhranovskyi, Ukrainian writer and actor
- 1992 – Literaturna Ukrayina, Ukrainian newspaper; Mykhaylo Braychevskyi, Ukrainian historian; Volodymyr Drozd, Ukrainian writer
- 1991 – Bohdan Hawrylyshyn, Ukrainian-Swiss economist; Zbigniew Brzezinski, American political scientist; Ivan Drach, Ukrainian poet
- 1990 – Ivan Dziuba, Ukrainian literary critic and dissident; Valeriy Shevchuk, Ukrainian writer
- 1989 – Martha Bohachevsky-Chomiak, American historian; Lina Kostenko, Ukrainian poet
- 1988 – John-Paul Himka, American-Canadian historian; George Shevelov, Ukrainian-American Slavic linguist; Hryhoriy Kostyuk, Ukrainian literature scholar
- 1987 – Robert Conquest, British historian; Leonid Plyushch, Ukrainian mathematician and Soviet dissident
- 1986 – Bohdan Krawchenko, Canadian political scientist; Natalya Livytska-Holodna, Ukrainian writer
- 1985 – David Saunders, British historian; Yuriy Lavrinenko, Ukrainian literature scholar
- 1984 – Magdalena László-Kuțiuk, Romanian Slavic scholar and translator; Yuriy Kolomiyets, Ukrainian poet
- 1983 – Linda Gordon, American feminist and historian; Emma Andijewska, Ukrainian poet and painter
- 1982 – Orest Subtelny, Canadian historian; Vasyl Stus, Ukrainian poet and dissident
- 1981 – Vasyl Barka, Ukrainian writer

== Literature ==
- Фундація Омеляна і Тетяни Антоновичів: Штрихи до історії Фундації. Виступи і лекції лавреатів нагород Антоновичів (1982–1998). — К., 1999. — 197с. — ISBN 966-95225-5-2
- Фундація Омеляна і Тетяни Антоновичів : матеріали до історії фундації : листування, грамоти, виступу та лекції лавреатів нагород Антоновичів (1998–2011). — Львів-Вашингтон: Львівська національна наукова бібліотека України імені В. Стефаника, 2012 ISBN 9789660265394
