= Krytyka =

Ukrainian intellectual monthly/bi-monthly magazine and publishing house

- Editor: George Grabowicz
- Frequency: Monthly, bi-monthly
- Publisher: Krytyka Group
- Founder: George Grabowicz
- Founded: 1997; 29 years ago
- First issue: August 1997
- Country: Ukraine
- Based in: Kyiv
- Language: Ukrainian, English
- Website: krytyka.com
- ISSN: 1563-6461
- OCLC: 309149458

Krytyka (Ukrainian: Критика, lit. ''Critique'') is a Ukrainian intellectual monthly/bi-monthly magazine (Ukrainian: часопис, romanized: chasopys) and publishing house dedicated to in-depth analysis of current affairs, culture and book reviews in Ukraine and the region. Krytyka was founded by the Harvard professor of Ukrainian literature, George Grabowicz, in 1997. The magazine is a partner of the Harvard Ukrainian Research Institute, University of St. Gallen (Center for Governance and Culture in Europe), and an exclusive partner of The New York Review of Books in Ukraine. Krytyka receives support from Western and Ukrainian foundations for its various projects, such as Robert Bosch Stiftung. Krytyka is a member of Eurozine, a network of European cultural magazines, and sees its role in mediating between Ukrainian and global intellectual elites. Since 2014, it is also available in English.

== Overview ==
Krytyka follows the model of The New York Review of Books, The Times Literary Supplement, and the Polish journal Kultura. The magazine offers detailed and research-based analysis of historical, political, and cultural developments in Ukraine, Russia, and Eastern Europe. Krytyka's main audience consists of liberal intellectuals, faculty members, and graduate students.

Krytyka is an avant-garde journal for discussions on issues otherwise less discussed in the Ukrainian context: historical memory, xenophobia, gender and sexual discrimination, revisions of literary canon, problems of Ukrainian scholarship and education, among others. Contributors to Krytyka include Ukrainian writers (Yuri Andrukhovych, Serhiy Zhadan, Taras Prokhasko), academics and intellectuals (Natalya Yakovenko, Mykola Riabchuk, Yaroslav Hrytsak, and Yevhen Minko) as well as numerous international authors like Timothy D. Snyder, Umberto Eco, and Richard Pipes, among others. Krytyka received wide recognition in Ukraine and internationally for the high quality of its publications.

Editorial Board of Krytyka consists of prominent public intellectuals and scholars Yuri Andrukhovych, Bogumiła Berdychowska, Yaroslav Hrytsak, Volodymyr Kulyk, Mikhail Minakov, Alexander J. Motyl, Serhii Plokhii, Yurko Prokhasko, Mykola Riabchuk, Oleksandr Savchenko, Yuriy Shapoval, Oleksiy Tolochko.

== Publishing house ==
Since 2000, Krytyka (as Krytyka Press) publishes books on history, political science, literary studies, art as well as belles lettres and memoirs. Among the large projects are the Chronicle of Collectivization and Holodomor in Ukraine. 1927 - 1933 and complete works of Panteleymon Kulish. Krytyka Press is the publisher of a number of magazines in Ukrainian studies including Mediaevalia Ukrainica: Mentality and History of Ideas, Ukrainian Review of Humanities, Ukrayina Moderna, East-West: Historical-Cultural Collection and Sentencia.

== Krytyka Institute ==
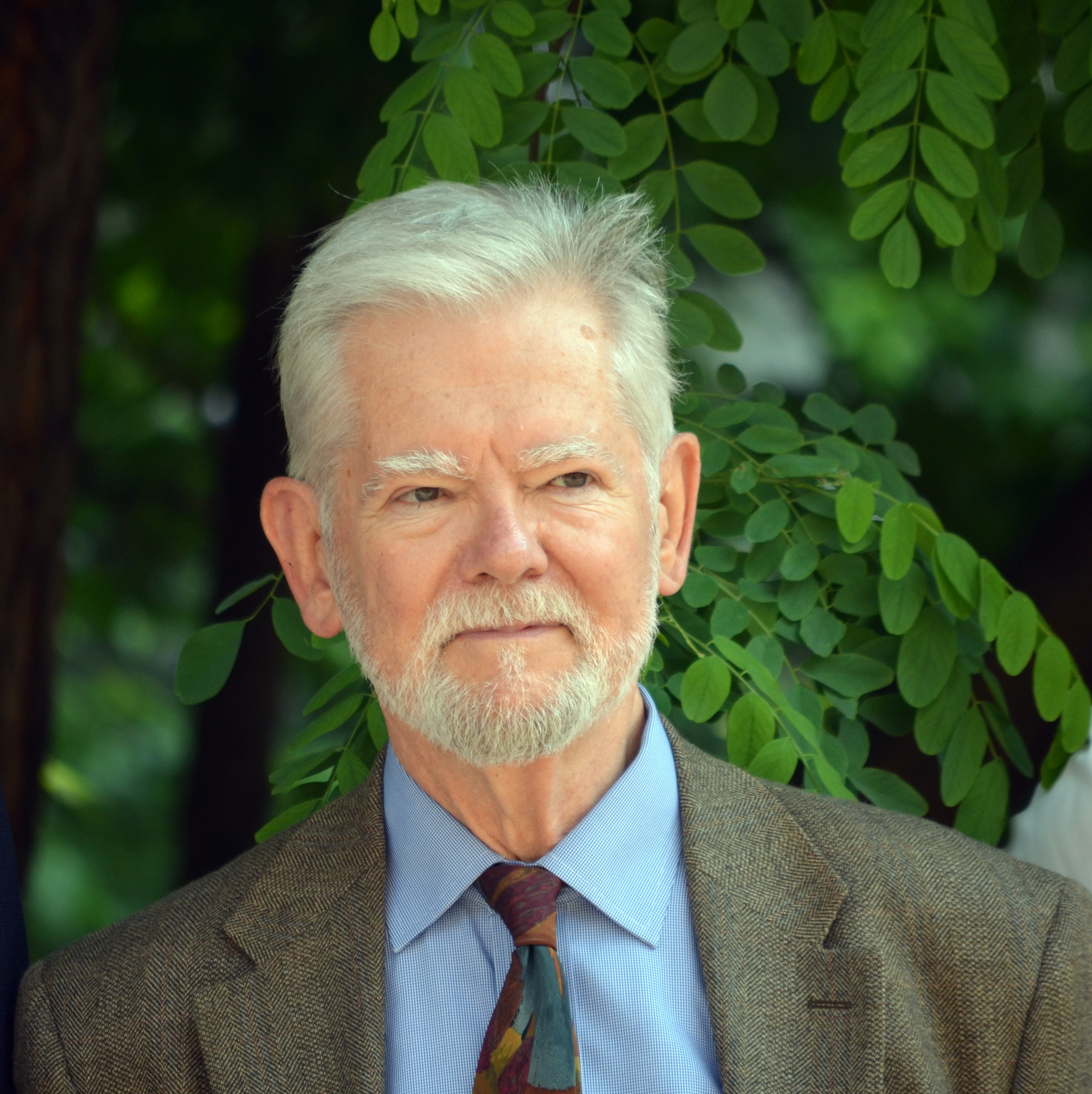
Magazine founder George Grabowicz in 2019

The Krytyka Institute was founded in 2003 as a not-for-profit institution to focus Krytyka's research and academic goals. The Institute organized two major international conferences in Kyiv, and a number of academic and cultural symposia and events, and published a number of books. The Krytyka Institute is engaged in a partnership with the Harvard Ukrainian Research Institute at Harvard University, which supports the Institutes publishing program. Mykhailo Minakov, Professor of Philosophy and Religion at Kyiv-Mohyla Academy is Director of the Krytyka Institute.

In 2013, the Krytyka Institute launched the first English-language scholarly journal on Ukrainian politics and society, Journal of Ukrainian Politics and Society (JUPS). Co-editors-in-chief are Dr. Nadiya Kravets (Harvard University) and Dr. Olha Onuch (University of Oxford).

Editorial Board of The Krytyka Institute: Michael S. Flier (Harvard University), Tamara Hundorova (Institute of Literature, National Academy of Sciences of Ukraine), Mykhailo Minakov (Kyiv-Mohyla Academy), Alexander J. Motyl (Rutgers University–Newark), Serhii Plokhy (Harvard University), Oleksiy Tolochko (Institute of History of Ukraine), Natalya Yakovenko (Kyiv-Mohyla Academy).

== Web platform and community ==
Krytyka's s web platform was relaunched in the fall of 2013, shortly before the events of the Euromaidan protest movement. It has since become a relevant forum for Ukrainian intellectuals voicing their opinion on the events in Ukraine following the ousting of the Ukrainian president Viktor Yanukovych, Russian annexation of the Crimea, and Russian military involvement in Ukraine.

The platform works with a wide network of experts, journalists, and international faculty members to provide in-depth analysis and substantial historical, political, and cultural context for the current situation in Ukraine. It emphasizes its interest in analysis that is grounded in extensive research and study and focuses on alternative solutions for Ukraine (project Critical Solutions). The platform seeks to participate in the global debate around key issues concerning the world today, while also articulating Ukrainian emphases and perspectives. It defines its goal as establishing high standards of cultural and political debate in Ukraine, especially with regard to freedom of speech and tolerance for differences of opinion.
