= Mykhailyna Kotsiubynska =

Ukrainian literary critic and translator

Mykhailyna Khomivna Kotsiubynska (Ukrainian: Михайлина Хомівна Коцюбинська; 18 December 1931 – 7 January 2011) was a Ukrainian literary critic, translator, and active participant of the Sixtiers movement. Laureate of many prestigious Ukrainian awards: Oles Biletsky Award (1993), Vasyl Stus Prize (1994), Antonovych Prize (1996), All-Ukrainian Literary Award named after Mykhailo Kotsiubinsky (1998), Olena Teliha Award (2001), Shevchenko National Prize (2009), Panteleimon Kulish Award (2015, posthumously). Knight of the Order of Princess Olga of the III degree (2006). Honored Worker of Science and Technology of Ukraine (December 2001). Niece of the classic of Ukrainian literature Mykhailo Kotsyubynskyi (daughter of his younger brother Khoma).

== Early life and education ==
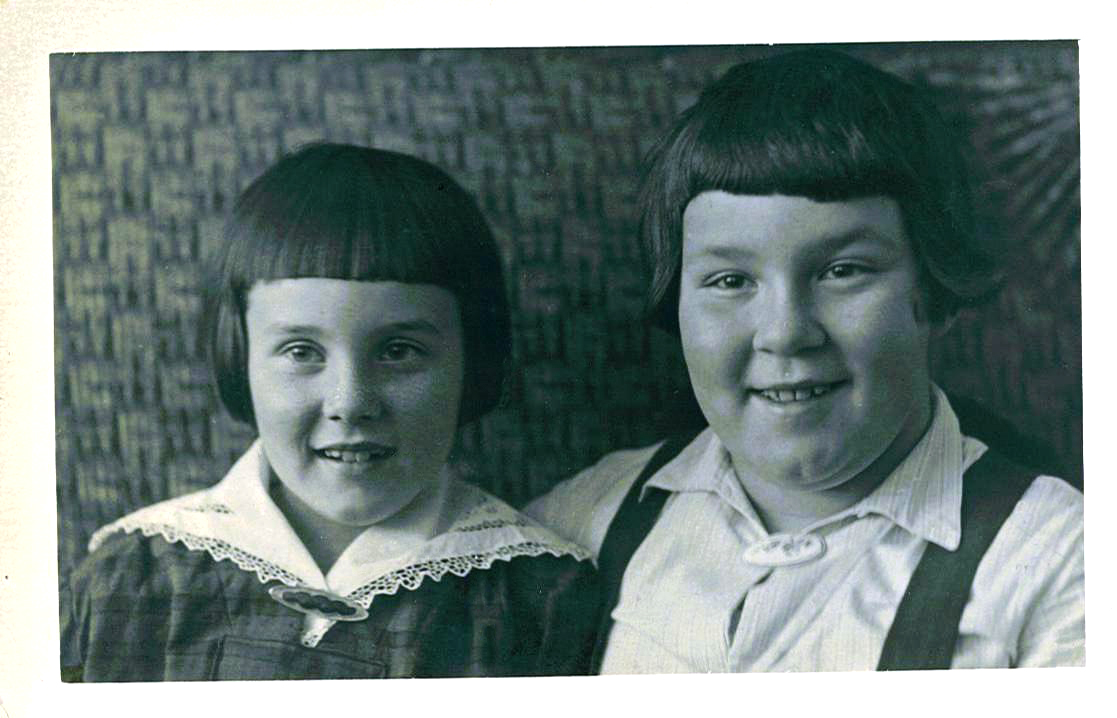
Mykhailyna Kotsiubinska (right) as a child in 1939

Kotsiubynska was born in Vinnytsia, where her father, Khoma Kotsiubynsky, created and managed the museum of the writer Mykhailo Kotsiubynsky. Her mother, Kateryna Bedryzova, was a Crimean Armenian by origin, who met Khoma Kotsiubynsky in Kyiv, in an orphanage where both were teachers. In 1929, Bedryzova-Kotsyubynska was accused of Ukrainian nationalism. Only her Armenian origin saved her from being included in the criminal case against members of the so-called Union for the Freedom of Ukraine.

In 1935, the family moved to Chernihiv, where the father of Kotsiubynska created and managed the Mykhailo Kotsiubinsky museum. In 1941 they were evacuated to Ufa.

Kotsiubynska graduated from the Faculty of Philology of Taras Shevchenko National University of Kyiv (1949–1954) with a major in "Ukrainian language and literature", and took the post-graduate course there. In 1958 she became a Candidate of Philological Sciences. Under the leadership of academician Oleksandr Biletskyi Kotsiubynska defended her PhD thesis Shevchenko's Poetics and Ukrainian Romanticism.

== Career ==
From November 1957 to 1968, she was first a junior researcher, and then a senior researcher at the Department of Theory of Literature and Shevchenko Studies of the Institute of Literature named after T. Shevchenko at the Academy of Sciences of the Ukrainian SSR. Kotsiubynska studied the language of artistic works, the poetics of Taras Shevchenko, the artistic individuality of Mykhailo Kotsyubynskyi, the specifics of figurative thinking, and its evolution in Ukrainian literature. In 1989, the perestroika Union of Writers of Ukraine elected Kotsiubynska as a member.

Since 1992, Kotsiubynska was a senior researcher at the Department of Manuscript Funds and Textology of the Institute of Literature named after Taras Shevchenko, National Academy of Sciences of Ukraine. She was the head of the editorial board of the academic collection of works by Vasyl Stus in 6 volumes (1994–1997). Kotsiubynska also worked as a compiler and commentator on a collection of works by Viacheslav Chornovil in 10 volumes (published since 2002).

Kotsiubynska is the author of articles, essays, memoirs, and critical memoirs about Vasyl Stus, Ivan Svitlychny, Zenovia Genyk-Berezovska, Pavlo Tychyna, Yevhen Sverstyuk, Borys Antonenko-Davydovych and others.

She published the letters of Vasyl Stus, Oleksandr Oles, Oleg Olzhych, Vasyl Stefanyk, and Vira Vovk. Kotsiubynska took an active part in public life.

In 2008, she became an honorary doctor of the National University of Kyiv-Mohyla Academy.

Kotsiubynska died in Kyiv on 7 January 2011, aged 79. She was buried at Baikove cemetery (plot No. 33).

== The Sixtiers movement ==
Kotsiubynska was an active participant in the Sixtiers movement, a non-conformist group of the Ukrainian intelligentsia that resisted the Soviet occupation in a non-violent way. She participated in the protest after watching Serhii Parajanov 's film Shadows of Forgotten Ancestors in the "Ukraine" cinema against the arrests of the Ukrainian intelligentsia in 1965. As result in 1966 Kotsiubynska was expelled from the ranks of the Communist Party of the Soviet Union. She was transferred to another department of the Institute of Literature and her monograph on Taras Shevchenko was not included in the publication plan.

Kotsiubynska was banned from publishing in the Soviet press. In 1968, she was dismissed from the Institute and looked for a job for almost a year due to an unspoken ban on her employment.

In 1972 Kotsiubynska was regularly interrogated by the KGB of the Ukrainian SSR, in particular, in the case of Vasyl Stus, whom she gave a high-profile at the court. She sent a letter of protest to the head of the Communist Party of Ukraine Volodymyr Shcherbytskyi, demanding the release of Nadiya Svitlychna from arrest. Kotsiubynska did not sign a joint letter of repentance with Zinovia Franko, fabricated by the KGB authorities, which was supposed to discredit the Sixtiers movement. She survived the blackmail of the Soviet authorities regarding the adopted Tetiana, who was threatened to be taken away from her family.

In 1977, a new series of interrogations have started in the criminal cases of Mykola Matusevich, Myroslav Marynovich, and Vasyl Stus.

== Personal life ==
In 1983, the KGB of the USSR actively interfered in the personal life of Kotsiubynska. She was banned from marrying the writer Borys Antonenko-Davydovych. She looked after the widowed writer, who offered her to marry and move in with him. But the authorities refused to register the marriage and in the end, recognized him as insane and placed him under the care of a relative. The KGB threatened to deprive Kotsiubynska of custody over her adopted daughter if she refused to cooperate.

Kotsiubynska considered the translator Hryhoriy Kochur and the writer Borys Antonenko-Davydovych to be her spiritual mentors. Yevgen Sverstyuk, Ivan Svitlychny, Yuriy Badzyo, and other members of the Sixtiers movement united in the Creative Youth Club had an exceptional influence on her. Kotsiubynska was friends with Alla Gorska, Olena Apanovych, Lina Kostenko and Zinovia Genyk-Berezovska from Prague.

Kotsiubynska had an adopted daughter Tetyana and a granddaughter Kateryna.

== Awards and honors ==
- Oles Biletsky Prize (1993)
- Vasyl Stus Prize (1994)
- Award of the Antonovych Foundation (1996)
- All-Ukrainian Literary Prize named after Mykhailo Kotsyubynskyi (1998)
- Olena Teliha Award (2001)
- Honored Worker of Science and Technology of Ukraine (December 2001)
- Chernihiv regional award named after Mykhailo Kotsyubynskyi (2003)
- Order of Princess Olga, III degree (2006)
- Honorary Doctor of the National University "Kyiv-Mohyla Academy" (2008)
- Taras Shevchenko National Prize of Ukraine (2009)
- Panteleimon Kulish Prize (2015, posthumously)

== Commemoration ==
On 22 September 2011, a memorial plaque was unveiled in Chernihiv in honor of Mykhailyna Kotsiubynska. It was installed on the facade of school No. 17 (former railway school No. 41), which Kotsyubynska graduated from in 1949 with a gold medal.

In 2017, she was posthumously awarded the Ivan Mazepa Medal by the International Literary and Art Academy of Ukraine.
