= Minakov =

Minakov (Russian: Минаков) or Minakova (Russian: Минакова; feminine) is a Russian surname. It may refer to:

- Andrey Minakov (born 2002), Russian swimmer
- Boris Minakov (1928–2021), Soviet diplomat
- Mikhail Minakov (born 1971), Russian philosopher, political scholar and historian
- Vasily Minakov (1921–2016), Soviet naval pilot and Hero of the Soviet Union
- Vitaly Minakov (born 1985), Russian mixed martial artist, sambist and judoka
