= Ukrainian world =

General social term

The Ukrainian World (Ukrainian: Український Світ, romanized: Ukrainskyi Svit) is a general social term, a figure of language to denote some associative connection with the Ukrainian language and culture.

== Ukrainian World in Ukrainian Studies ==
The Ukrainian world is a cognitive metaphor, a metaphysical concept in Ukrainian studies is abstracted and derived (generalized) by certain features of the concept (Note: The defining categorical characteristics of this concept are integrity, universality, originality, self-sufficiency, self-development, unity, and intermediacy of all its dimensions. Source: Tetiana Voropaieva Candidate of Psychological Sciences, Associate Professor, Senior Research Fellow, Center for Ukrainian Studies, Faculty of Philosophy, Taras Shevchenko National University, Mykola Obushny - Doctor of Political Sciences, Professor, Director of the Center for Ukrainian Studies, Taras Shevchenko University «Theoretical and methodological principles of modern Ukrainian studies») of ontological reality, united in its integrity by certain sociocultural, ethnonational, socio-historical, geoeconomic, geopolitical features. The expression is one of the main concepts included in the structure of the subject field of Ukrainian studies ontological thought in the philosophical study of the theory (Note: Ukrainian studies are on the way from an object-oriented set of interdisciplinary research to a separate science. Source: Tetyana Voropaeva, Candidate of Psychological Sciences, Associate Professor, Senior Researcher, Center for Ukrainian Studies, Faculty of Philosophy, Taras Shevchenko National University, Mykola Obushny - Doctor of Political Sciences, Professor, Director of the Center for Ukrainian Studies, Faculty of Philosophy, Taras Shevchenko National University «Theoretical and methodological principles of modern Ukrainian studies») of "what exists and how it exists", along with the concepts: "Ukrainians", "Ukrainianness", (Note: By the term "Ukrainianness" we mean Ukrainians not only as an indigenous ethnic group that embraces certain areas from ancient times to the present day but also as a global phenomenon (including Ukrainians living in more than 60 countries and have not lost their national and cultural identity). ... That is, the concept of "Ukrainianness" can include both ethnic Ukrainians and active and conscious representatives of non-Ukrainians - those who linked their destiny with Ukraine, in particular, made a significant contribution to the development of Ukrainian culture, science, statehood. ... Ukraine (as a general civilization phenomenon) is a collective concept that encompasses both ethnic and political Ukrainians, as well as representatives of the Ukrainian diaspora. Source: Tetiana Voropaieva Candidate of Psychological Sciences, Associate Professor, Senior Research Fellow, Center for Ukrainian Studies, Faculty of Philosophy, Taras Shevchenko National University, Mykola Obushny - Doctor of Political Sciences, Professor, Director of the Center for Ukrainian Studies, Taras Shevchenko University «Theoretical and methodological principles of modern Ukrainian studies») "Ukrainian man", "Ukraine", "Ukrainian society", "Ukrainian nature", "Ukrainian culture","universal civilization", etc. Ukraine and world Ukrainianness together - the "all-planet Ukrainian World" — "is an object, a source, an image and an analogue of the destiny of Ukrainian studies." The Ukrainian world is a cognitive metaphor that defines the specifics of the fundamental path of Ukrainian human existence in the world and the culture that is objectified in metaculture (Note: Metaculture is all the universal concepts present in all cultures) on its basis, which is based on the interaction of Ukrainian worldview, which was created and transformed over millennia and today represents the essence of being and consciousness of Ukrainians as a nation.

The object of Ukrainian studies is the real Ukrainian world, which was created and transformed over millennia and today represents the essence of existence and consciousness of Ukrainians as a nation. This is an ontological reality, united in its integrity by certain socio-cultural, ethno-national, socio-historical, geoeconomic, geopolitical features. The defining categorical characteristics of the Ukrainian world are the integrity, universality, originality, self-sufficiency, self-development, unity and intermediacy of all its dimensions.

In essence, the Ukrainian World is a common "civilizational space" of world Ukrainians (Ukraine plus world Ukrainians), designed to expand Ukraine's geopolitical presence in the world and the realization of Ukraine's national interests through international integration and cooperation. Fundamentals of the Ukrainian World, emphasized by various authors: spirituality and the state, Ukrainian culture and the Ukrainian language, national economy and developed social sphere, Ukrainian science and technology.

Ukrainians living in different countries of the world (diaspora) according to Ukrainian legislation have the status of a foreign Ukrainian, according to various estimates from 12 to 20 million people — communicating in Ukrainian at home, with colleagues at work, uniting by interests in : circles, artistic groups, public organizations, religious associations, opening and founding: educational institutions, mass media, churches, monasteries, museums, libraries, cultural centers, cultural monuments, etc. — create the Ukrainian World. Their status and principles of activity are regulated by the national legislation of the host country and normative legal acts of Ukraine.

== Some views on the Ukrainian world ==
- His Holiness Sviatoslav, Supreme Archbishop of Kyiv and Halych, Metropolitan of Kyiv, Primate of the Ukrainian Greek Catholic Church:

"I understand the Ukrainian world as the unity and solidarity of Ukrainians in Ukraine and around the world. To build the Ukrainian world means to care for one's culture and love the Ukrainian people, as well as to ensure that the dignity of Ukrainians is respected by other peoples. "

- The First President of Ukraine Leonid Kravchuk on the Ukrainian and Russian worlds:

"There will be no President in Ukraine who is supported by Russia, Russian beau monde, even at the level of the Russian government, I'm not talking about the various political forces there. When Russian President Vladimir Putin says that Ukraine is an unnatural state, what can be said keep talking? ”

- Ukrainian politician and public figure, Head of the Security Service of Ukraine Valentyn Nalyvaichenko

Together with my like-minded people, I propose and support the doctrine of the Ukrainian world. This means integration into the European space. This means a radical renewal of life in our country. This means establishing economic rules that will create jobs, support small and medium-sized businesses, attract foreign and domestic investment without fear of corruption. This means a complete reform of the medical and social spheres, so that people are treated not as cattle, but as the main value of the state. This means cleansing Ukraine of all the Soviet rubbish that our previous leaders failed to reject due to a lack of will. This means the Ukrainian world, which will always stand against any neo-imperial concepts.

- The Fifth President of Ukraine Petro Poroshenko on the identity of the Ukrainian people:

"My task as President is to create the right conditions for a fair policy of national memory. This is the policy of returning to our historical sources, which I have been implementing since the day of my inauguration and will continue. Because experience teaches that when we fall into amnesia, we become easy. booty of the enemy in a hybrid war. We honor Ukrainian heroes, celebrate our holidays and anniversaries. And we will never again allow the expansion of Soviet-Russian imperial ideology into the Ukrainian space. Here you do not have "Russian world", here - the Ukrainian world! "

- Chairman of the Verkhovna Rada Andrii Parubii in greeting the Ukrainian people since 2017:

We are building our Ukrainian world. ...Our values - peace and freedom - are the millennial values of our people. From the times of Kyivan Rus. Today, thousands of Ukrainian boys and girls are fighting on the front lines for our right to live with dignity. Apparently, the enemy in his imperial delusion forgot that not only swords are forged on the plow, but also forged swords from a plow. And hundreds of burned enemy tanks quickly reminded the Kremlin that "Ukrainians are a nation of warriors." I want to wish God's protection to our heroes. Return victorious to your family. Whole and undamaged. You are the hope and future of the Ukrainian state! We will definitely vacate our land! We will re-sow our enemy-occupied fields! And we will gather a new harvest!

== Education, language, culture and traditions in the Ukrainian world ==
Individuals who belong to the Ukrainian World have the opportunity to join the Ukrainian culture and art, learn the Ukrainian language, customs and traditions of Ukrainians, as well as receive Ukrainian education regardless of their place of residence.

Children of citizens and residents of Ukraine have the opportunity to receive general secondary education in a network of secondary schools located in Ukraine.

Children of residents of other countries have the opportunity to obtain primary, basic and complete general secondary education in Ukraine at the International Ukrainian School by distance learning methods. The International Ukrainian School, in cooperation with a network of Ukrainian schools abroad, also combines distance and / or full-time teaching methods. Training in these methods provides an opportunity to obtain official documents of the Ukrainian model, which certify the educational levels of each student. Children of Ukrainian citizens temporarily living abroad have the opportunity to study for free. Children of Ukrainian citizens living in the occupied territories of Luhansk and Donetsk oblasts and the Crimea also have the same opportunity.

In addition, both in Ukraine and abroad, there is a network of international schools where students have the opportunity to participate in Ukrainian culture and art, to study the Ukrainian language and literature, as well as to obtain official documents on educational levels in language and literature levels of relevant requirements of the international bachelor's degree. If students do not want to obtain educational documents, but study the language and literature "for themselves", the level of knowledge they receive is not assessed, official documents are not issued.

The network of Ukrainian educational institutions outside Ukraine provides an opportunity to join the Ukrainian culture and art, study the Ukrainian language, customs and traditions of Ukrainians almost all over the world. These are usually Saturday or Sunday schools or schools that work part-time or optional. After the opening of the International Ukrainian School, some of them have established or are establishing cooperation to obtain the opportunity to provide educational levels and state-standard documents for Ukrainian general secondary education.

== Ukrainian world in literature and art ==
- Mykola Gogol's Ukrainian world in the story "Evening against Ivan Kupala"
- Aesthetic world of Ukrainians in the national literary heritage
- "Ukrainian World" - exhibitions of works by Volodymyr Dziubenko. 2011
- "Ukrainian world" in artifacts and masterpieces. Ukraine Young. Number 127 for 30.08.2012

== See also ==
- Greater Ukraine

== Sources ==
- Конституція України. Ст. 11,12.
- Перелік документів для оформлення статусу закордонного українця
- Закон України про правовий статус закордонних українців
- Діаспора будує Український Світ
- Український Простір
- Український Світ. Фейсбук.
- Проект «УКРАЇНЦІ В СВІТІ»
- Український Світ у соціальних мережах
- Перелік документів для оформлення статусу закордонного українця
- Закон України про правовий статус закордонних українців
- Віктор Рибаченко («Час і Події»). Український світ: проблеми побудови.
- Віталій Абліцов. Будувати Український Світ
- Олександр Пономарів. Творити український світ!
- Брама в Український Світ
- Заступник Голови Верховної Ради України Микола Томенко про «Український Світ» в Україні.
- Програма курсу «Український світ» для учителів недільних (суботніх) шкіл українського зарубіжжя
- Володимир Білецький. Це ми, Плането, — українці.
- «Украинский мир»: Украина и ее диаспора
- Мені мила українська мова і мій український світ
- Про «український світ» у світі
- Вибрані наукові матеріали Донецького вісника Наукового Товариства ім. Шевченка та інформаційно-аналітичного журналу «Схід»
- Ukrainian World
- Д. В. Табачник, Г. Д. Попов Українці зарубіжжя та Україна. Довідник. Київ 2007
