= Volodymyr Okarynskyi =

Ukrainian historian

- Володимир Михайлович Окаринський
- Born: 14 November 1975 (age 50); Ternopil, Ukraine
- Education: Ternopil Pedagogical Institute, Taras Shevchenko National University of Kyiv
- Occupation: Historian

Volodymyr Okarynskyi (Ukrainian: Володимир Михайлович Окаринський, born 14 November 1975) is a Ukrainian historian. He holds a PhD in History from 2001 and has been an Associate professor from 2004. He has been a member of the National Union of Journalists of Ukraine from 2003.

== Biography ==
Volodymyr Okarynskyi was born on 14 November 1975, in Ternopil.

He graduated from the Ternopil Pedagogical Institute in 1997 and completed his postgraduate studies at the Taras Shevchenko National University of Kyiv in 2002. From 2002 to 2004, he taught at the Ternopil Institute of Social and Information Technologies. From 2004, he has been a faculty member at the Ternopil Volodymyr Hnatiuk National Pedagogical University, initially within the Department of Ukrainian History, which is now the Department of History of Ukraine, Archaeology, and Special Branches of Historical Sciences.

Between 2003 and 2004, he authored regular columns dedicated to the history of Ternopil and Ukraine for the Ternopilska Hazeta. He is also a member of the editorial board for the encyclopedic publication Ternopilshchyna. History of cities and villages (2014) and has been a member of the International Association for the Humanities from 2018. He is a contributor to the Great Ukrainian Encyclopedia.

== Research ==
In 2001, he defended his PhD dissertation, "Ukrainskyi Skautskyi Rukh (1911–1944)".

As of 2025, according to Google Scholar, Okarynskyi works have been cited over 110 times, with an h-index of 6.

His research interests include alternative lifestyles, subcultures, and counterculture in Ukraine in the modern and contemporary periods; intellectual history; historical anthropology; local history (Ternopil); and youth movements.

== Works ==
Author of about 100 scientific publications, 4 monographs, co-author of 5 collective monographs, as well as books:

- Plastovyi rukh na Ternopilshchyni (The Plast Movement in the Ternopil Oblast) (2007),
- Ternopil / Tarnopol: istoriia mista (Ternopil / Tarnopol: History of the City) (2010, co-author),
- Ternopil: misto, liudy, istoriia (vid davnosti do 1991 roku) (Ternopil: City, People, History (from Antiquity to 1991)) (2017).

== Awards ==
- President of Ukraine Prize (2004) and Government of Ukraine Prize (2008) for young scientists,
- Volodymyr Hnatiuk Prize (2018).
