= Ivan Svit =

Ukrainian-born American historian

- Іван Світ
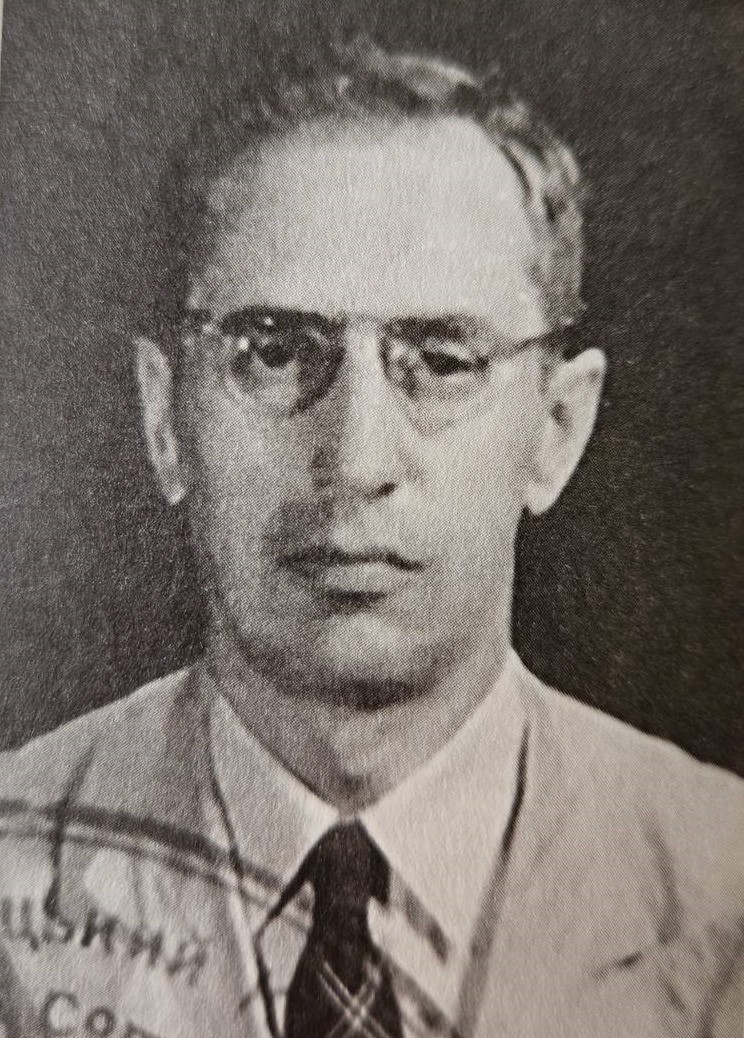
- Born: Ivan Svitlanov; 27 April 1897 near Kharkiv, Ukrainian SSR, Soviet Union
- Died: 8 March 1989 (aged 91); Seattle, U.S.
- Other name: John V. Sweet
- Citizenship: United States
- Education: Kharkiv Seminary

Ivan Vasylyovych Svitlanov (Ukrainian: Іван Васильович Світланов), later known as Ivan Svit or John V. Sweet (27 April 1897 – 8 March 1989), was a Ukrainian-born American emigrant in China, historian, journalist, writer, stamp collector, and part-time dealer, as well as a social activist in the Far East.

== Life ==
Ivan Svit, or John V. Sweet, as he was known in the United States, was born on 27 April 1897 in Kharkiv region. His original name, prior to his conscious embrace of his Ukrainian identity, was Ivan Svitlanov.

He had been educated at a seminary and then studied mathematics and physics at Kharkiv University. In March 1918, he moved to the Far East, originally intending to move to the United States. However, he ended up living between Vladivostok, Japan, and China from 1918 to 1949. Svit published a Ukrainian periodical in Vladivostok and, in October of 1922, immigrated to Chinese Harbin, where he worked at a newspaper. He was a key figure within the Ukrainian expatriate community. When Manchuria was taken over by the Japanese in 1932 and Manchukuo was established, there were 11,000 Ukrainians living in Harbin, where a Ukrainian National House had been established. Ivan Svit was one of the founders and writers of the Ukrainian weekly paper in Harbin called the Manchurian Bulletin (1932-1938) which appealed to the substantial Ukrainian émigré population in Harbin. That publication lasted through the Japanese occupation.

In China, Ivan Svit ran a small stamp business, which gave him a stable income and helped him to survive this difficult time, during which he was very active in the Ukrainian community. In 1944, he participated in creation of the first Ukrainian-Japanese Dictionary. Later, with the collapse of Manchukuo and the arrival of the Soviet Army to China, he moved from Harbin to Shanghai, where he was a member of the Ukrainian National Committee of Shanghai. There, he helped produce documents to move about 200 Ukrainians out of China to the USA, Argentina, and Australia.

Ivan Svit himself moved to Taiwan in 1949 and then, in 1951, he continued on to Alaska and then to New York. He became a member of UWAN (Ukrainian Academy of Arts and Science) and researched the history of the Ukrainian diaspora. He regularly submitted articles about stamps to The China Stamp Society's journal, The China Clipper sending news from Harbin of new issues and varieties he had discovered. He was the Editor of the Journal of the Ukrainian Philatelic and Numismatic Society (Est. 1951) from 1961 until 1972.

In 1972, he published a book on the history of Ukrainian-Japanese relations, which still today remains the only existing proper book on the topic. He was interested in many topics: he wrote about economic affairs, Ukrainians in Asia, Ukrainian activities in the Far East, and many other things. He was also a successful entrepreneur. He was never known during Soviet rule in Ukraine and largely has been ignored by Ukrainian historians to this day, mainly because he represented Ukrainian communities that left the Soviet Union for ideological reasons.

Ivan Svit was also a successful entrepreneur who owned postage stamp shops in Harbin and Shanghai. He juggled his historical interests with running a business and owning a shop, allowing him and his family to survive through difficult years in China.

Professor, Kazuo Nakai, a prominent Japanese professor of Ukrainian studies, had met Ivan Svit in the US in the early 1980s.

== Works ==
- Green Ukraine
- Ukrainian-Japanese relations 1903-1945
- Ukrainian National House in Harbin
- Trial over Ukrainians in Chita
- A short history of the Ukrainian movement in the Far East
