= Bohdan Bociurkiw =

Ukrainian-Canadian political scientist and historian (1925–1998)

- Богдан Боцюрків
- Born: Bohdan Rostyslav Botsiurkiv; September 3, 1925; Buczacz, Poland (now Buchach, Ukraine)
- Died: October 1, 1998 (aged 73); Ottawa, Ontario, Canada
- Spouse: Vera Wasylyshyn (m. 1950)

Academic background
- Education: Goethe University Frankfurt
- Alma mater: University of Manitoba (BA, MA); University of Chicago (PhD)

Academic work
- Discipline: Political science, history, Slavic studies
- Sub-discipline: Ukrainian studies
- Institutions: University of Alberta; Carleton University
- Main interests: Ukrainian Greek Catholic Church, human rights, Soviet nationalities policy, Russification, multiculturalism

Bohdan Rostyslav Bociurkiw (Ukrainian: Богдан-Ростислав Боцюрків, romanized: Bohdan-Rostyslav Botsiurkiv; September 2, 1925 – October 1, 1998) was a Ukrainian-Canadian political scientist, historian and activist who was professor of Soviet politics at Carleton University from 1969 to 1992, previously working as professor of Soviet politics at the University of Alberta from 1956 to 1969. Bociurkiw is credited with creating the Institute of Soviet and East European Studies at Carleton University.

== Early life and career ==
Bohdan Rostyslav Bociurkiw was born on September 2 or 3, 1925 to Ilarion Botsiurkiv in the city of Buczacz, located in Tarnopol Voivodeship within the Second Polish Republic (now Buchach, in Ukraine's Ternopil Oblast). Ilarion was a lawyer and a leading member of Prosvita and the Ukrainian cooperative movement in Buczacz County, heading the Buczacz County Cooperatives Union.

Bociurkiw graduated from a people's school in Lwów (now Lviv) before attending the Lviv Ukrainian Academic Gymnasium. From 1940 to 1941, he studied archaeology at Goethe University Frankfurt. He was a member of an anti-Nazi Ukrainian nationalist underground group during the early stages of World War II; he was later captured by the Gestapo and imprisoned at both Flossenbürg concentration camp and its subcamp in Lengenfeld. Throughout the war and shortly afterwards, Bociurkiw wrote in Ukrainian nationalist magazines, including Yunak, Our Path and Independent Ukraine.

Bociurkiw emigrated to Canada in 1947 after being left displaced in Germany following the conclusion of World War II. He subsequently studied at the University of Manitoba, graduating with a Bachelor of Arts in 1952 and a Master of Arts in 1954. He was also a student at the University of Chicago, where he acquired a PhD in 1961. His dissertation was entitled "Soviet Church Policy in Ukraine, 1917-1939". Bociurkiw became a naturalized Canadian citizen in 1953, and married his wife, Vera Wasylyshyn, in 1950.

Bociurkiw began teaching at the University of Alberta in 1956. He taught political science, particularly focusing on the Soviet Union, the Ukrainian Soviet Socialist Republic and relations between church and state. He was a member of the Ukrainian National Federation of Canada, serving as national secretary of the youth wing of the group from 1949 to 1953 and as secretary of the organisation from 1952 to 1953.

== Carleton University ==
Bociurkiw became professor of political science at Carleton University in Ottawa in 1969. His recruitment was a victory for university president Davidson Dunton, who emphasized regional studies and greater attention to non-Soviet ethnic groups within the Soviet Union, and Bociurkiw was tasked with reorganizing the Committee on Soviet and East European Studies into an institute of the university. Under Bociurkiw, the newly-established Institute of Soviet and East European Studies (ISEES) became a high-profile body, largely due to Bociurkiw's focus on interdisciplinary studies and the popularity of the institute's focus among Ottawa's communities of governmental and non-governmental figures.

Bociurkiw was active in the promotion of Ukrainian studies and Slavic studies across Canada during this period. He joined the Shevchenko Scientific Society prior to 1967, but became deputy chair of its history and philosophy section in Canada in 1988, while a professor at Carleton. He additionally served as a consultant to the government of the United States on human rights and Soviet dissidents, as well as advising the Canadian government on matters of multiculturalism.

== Later years and death ==
Bociurkiw left Carleton in 1992. He was seriously ill throughout the year, with The Independent reporting that many believed him to be on his deathbed. The uncovering of previously-sealed documents from Soviet archives concerning the 1946 Synod of Lviv helped Bociurkiw to recover, and he later said, "I asked the Almighty for a sabbatical to finish the book and I regained enough strength to do it." He continued to write, though at a reduced capacity, for the remainder of his life, focusing on the suppression of the Ukrainian Greek Catholic Church (which he was a member of) under Soviet rule and its merging into the Russian Orthodox Church. His final work, The Ukrainian Greek Catholic Church and the Soviet State (1939–1950), was published in 1996.

Bociurkiw died on October 1, 1998 in Ottawa. He was buried in Edmonton.
