= Ukrainian studies =

Area studies focused on Ukraine

Ukrainian studies is an interdisciplinary field of research dedicated to Ukrainian language, literature, history and culture in a broad sense.

== Ukrainian studies within Ukraine ==
- Institute of History of Ukraine
  - Centre for Kyivan Rus' Studies (Ukrainian: Сектор досліджень історії Київської Русі) in Kyiv, by Oleksiy Tolochko and Tetyana Vilkul
- National Academy of Sciences of Ukraine
- Vernadsky National Library of Ukraine
- Naukova Dumka and its successor Akademperiodyka

== Ukrainian studies outside Ukraine ==
A number of research institutes outside of Ukraine focus on Ukrainian studies. (Note: See List of Ukrainian scientific institutions) The major centers include:

- Cambridge Ukrainian Studies at the University of Cambridge.
- Canadian Institute of Ukrainian Studies at the University of Alberta
- Centre for Ukrainian Canadian Studies at University of Manitoba and St. Andrew's College.
- Centre for Ukrainian Studies at the Institute of History of Saint Petersburg State University.
- Harvard Ukrainian Research Institute at Harvard University
- Ukrainian Free University in Munich
- Ukrainian Studies Program at the Harriman Center of Columbia University

== Journals ==
- East/West: Journal of Ukrainian Studies published by University of Alberta
- Harvard Ukrainian Studies, published by the Harvard Ukrainian Research Institute at Harvard University
- Ukrainian Historical Journal, published by the Institute of History of Ukraine

== Noted scholars ==
- Dmytro Chyzhevsky (1894-1977)
- Yaroslav Hrytsak (born 1960)
- Zenon Kohut (born 1944)
- Taras Kuzio
- Alexander J. Motyl (born 1953)
- Serhii Plokhy (born 1957)
- George Shevelov (1908-2002)
- Timothy Snyder (born 1969)
- Frank Sysyn (born 1946)
- Mark von Hagen (1954-2019)

== See also ==
- Encyclopedia of History of Ukraine
- Encyclopedia of Modern Ukraine (from 1900 onwards)
- Great Ukrainian Encyclopedia (general knowledge from a Ukrainian perspective)
- Izbornyk (litopys.org.ua), digital library: "History of Ukraine 9th–18th centuries. Primary sources and interpretation"
- АРХІВ Ukrainian Map Collection 2,103 maps of Ukraine, Crimea and Central Europe
