= Yevhen Hutsalo =

Ukrainian writer and journalist (1937–1995)

- Євген Гуцало
- Born: 14 January 1937; Staryi Zhyvotiv, Vinnytsia Oblast, Ukrainian SSR, Soviet Union
- Died: 4 July 1995 (aged 58); Kyiv, Ukrainian SSR, Soviet Union
- Citizenship: Ukraine
- Occupations: Writer, journalist
- Writing career
- Notable awards: Shevchenko National Prize

Yevhen Hutsalo (Ukrainian: Євген Гуцало; 14 January 1937 – 4 July 1995) was a Ukrainian writer and journalist.

== Biography ==
Hutsalo was born in Staryi Zhyvotiv, Vinnytsia Oblast. He graduated from the Nizhyn Pedagogical Institute in 1959, and was first published in 1960. During the 1960s, Hutsalo was considered one of the "shestydesyatnyky" (the sixtiers), or those who were opposed to the oppressive communist regime. However, later on he chose to be an official writer rather than one opposed to the regime.

He published over 25 novella and short-story collections (several of them for children), a trilogy of novels, and three poetry collections. His works are noted for their detail, lyrical descriptions of nature, psychological portraits, and abundant use of the rural vernacular.

In 1985 Hutsalo was awarded the Shevchenko Prize and in 1994 the Antonovych prize.

In Kyiv a lane dedicated to Field Marshal of the Russian Empire Mikhail Kutuzov was renamed after Yevhen Hutsalo in 2016.
