= Petro Jacyk =

Peter Jacyk
- Яцик Петро Дмитрович
- Born: 7 July 1921; Verkhnie Synovydne, today Stryi Raion, Lviv oblast, Ukraine
- Died: 1 November 2001 (aged 80); Toronto, Canada
- Known for: Philanthropy, Entrepreneurship
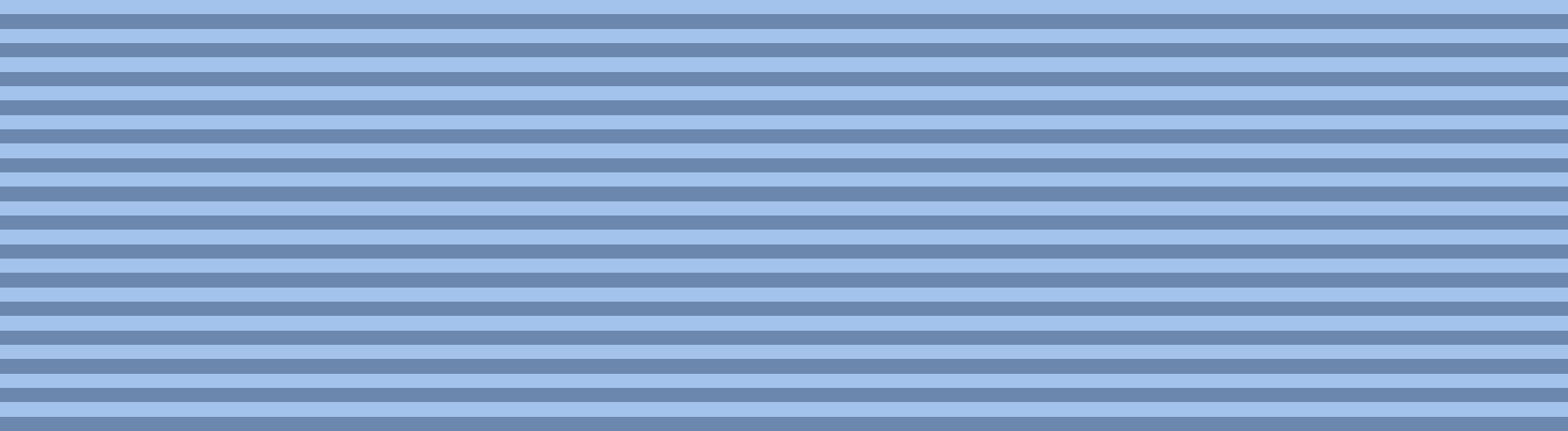
- Awards
- Website: www.pjef.ca

Peter "Petro" Jacyk (July 7, 1921— November 1, 2001) was a Canadian entrepreneur of Ukrainian descent and a philanthropist.

He was the founder of the Prombank Group of Companies and the Petro Jacyk Education Foundation.

== Early life and education ==
Jacyk was born into a peasant family in the small rural village of Verkhnie Synyovydne, then part of Poland.

In 1944 Jacyk left Ukraine as a refugee and settled in St. Pölten (Austria), then in 1945 he headed to Regensburg (Germany) and from there immigrated to Canada as a displaced person in 1949.

Jacyk completed high school, a six-month course in steam engines and a one-year course in dairy products and production. He studied Spanish, German and English in preparation for immigration. Once in Canada, he completed the Economics and Management Practices program at the University of Toronto, doing so part-time while building his business.

== Career ==
In Toronto he worked in a dairy, for CN, started Arka Book Store, owned a restaurant, a furniture store, and partnered with 17 others in an aluminum window and door manufacturing. He ventured to become a sole residential house builder and developer by establishing Accurate Builders Limited and Prombank Investment Limited in 1959. Several years later he branched out to include industrial-commercial development. The Prombank Group of Companies survives him into the second generation.

“Through most of his adult life, Peter Jacyk celebrated two separate but linked qualities: his Ukrainian roots and his Canadian identity. Neither was permitted to interfere with or denigrate the other; each represented a different facet of his pride”.

== Philanthropy ==
Being aware of the poor economic situation of Ukrainians in Brazil, Jacyk provided funding for the construction of a Cultural and Religious Center for Brazilian-Ukrainian Youth (Poltava) in Curitiba, Parana, Brazil. The Seminary of St. Josephat and the St. Olga Ukrainian Orphanage, Prudentopolis, Parana, Brazil. Annual donations to the orphanage were made for over two decades.

In 1979, Jacyk headed the fundraising committee for the multivolume Ukrainian-language Encyclopedia of Ukraine (Entsyklopediia ukraïnoznavstva) being published by the Shevchenko Scientific Society in Sarcelles, France. He recognized the Encyclopedia as an indispensable foundation for Ukrainian studies. In 1984–93 the English version of Encyclopedia was completed by CIUS, University of Alberta and published by the University of Toronto Press.

In 1986 he established the Petro Jacyk Education Foundation, whose goal is to support educational programs and academic centers in world renowned universities devoted to the scholarly interpretation and dissemination of objective information about Ukraine and Ukrainians as well as sponsoring other initiatives which contribute to the promotion of international awareness of Ukraine and its people.

Donations were made to establish Institutes, Endowments, Chairs, Visiting Fellowships, Post-Doctoral Fellowships and programs at renown universities such as Harvard University, University of Alberta, University of London, University of North London, Columbia University, University of Toronto and University of Toronto Robarts Library.

In 2000 Jacyk initiated and fully financed the International Ukrainian Language Contest in Ukraine, which received official status from the Ukrainian Parliament. The Petro Jacyk Education Foundation was the major funder for the next six years. The Language Contest continues today.

== Other activities ==
- Harvard Ukrainian Research Institute (HURI).
- Ukrainian Studies Fund committee member, Harvard University.
- Harvard Visiting Committee, Harvard University, MA.
- Harriman Advisory Committee, Columbia University, NY.
- Sponsor of the Bloor West Village Ukrainian Festival since inception in 1995.
- President, St. Josephat's Ukrainian Catholic Credit Union (1958–1967).
- Member, Mississauga Board of Trade, the Canadian Federation of Independent Business.
- Member, the Ukrainian Canadian Professional and Business Club.
- Member, the Canada-USSR Business Council.
- Participation in Canadian political elections at the municipal, provincial and federal levels.
- PLAST (the Ukrainian scout organization).
- Published numerous articles in Canadian and Ukrainian newspapers.

== Honors ==
- In 1995, the Honorary Doctorate of Laws by the University of Alberta.
- In 1996, the Presidential Prize of Ukraine for his patronage of Ukrainian culture, education, and scholarship.
- In 2000, the Order of Prince Yaroslav the Wise 5th class.
- In 2001, Ukraine's Person of the Year, International philanthropy award.
