= Ab Imperio =

- Discipline: history, anthropology, sociology, politology
- Language: English, Russian

Standard abbreviations
- ISO 4: Ab Imp.

Links
- Journal homepage

Ab Imperio: Studies of New Imperial History and Nationalism in the Post-Soviet Space – international scientific referable journal, which developing direction “New Imperial History”, devoted to the interdisciplinary and comparative study of the history of nationalism, national movements in the post-Soviet space.

== History ==
The magazine was founded in 1999; its first publication was done in June 2000 in Kazan. The idea to publish the magazine belonged to Alla Zeid, the name was suggested by Sergei Glebov. Since 2002, the articles in the magazine correspond to a pre-approved annual thematic.

In an interview with Logos Magazine Marina Mogilner and Sergei Glebov say that the preconditions for the appearance of the magazine were the lack of such quarterly scientific periodicals and the desire to study the history of the post-Soviet space through the prism of nationalism studies.

"The idea of a new professional historical journal arose in 1998, when it became finally clear that the main Russian historical journals -" Вопросы истории"and "Отечественная история "- could not be reformed."

In the autumn of 1999, the owner of the humanitarian holding Irina Prokhorova offered a franchise project in New York: the New Historical Review (NIO) magazine, built on principles similar to the one that later formed the basis for Ab Imperio, an international quarterly, thematic numbers, etc.

The proposal was accepted subject to the location of the editorial office in Moscow, under the direct control of the New Literature Review. This condition did not suit the future editors, and the project did not take place.

== Editors ==
- Ilya Gerasimov, Ph.D., Cand.Sc.
- Sergey Glebov, Ph.D., Smith College and the Five Colleges, History Department
- Alexander Kaplunovsky, Candidate of History
- Marina Mogilner, Ph.D., Candidate of History
- Alexander Semenov, Ph.D., Smolny Institute of Liberal Arts and Sciences / St. Petersburg State University
- Yaroslav Hrytsak, Doctor of Historical Sciences

== The Main Publications on the New Imperial History ==
- New Imperial History of Post-Soviet Space: Collection of Аrticles (Library of “Аb Imperio”) / ed. Gerasimov I., Glebov S., Kaplunovsky L., Mogilner M., Semenov L. — Kazan: Centre of Nationalism and Empire Studies, 2004. - 652 pp. - 1000 copies
- Empire Speaks Out: Languages of Rationalization and Self-Description in the Russian Empire, 2009
- New Imperial History of Northern Eurasia (Journal Library: "Ab Imperio") / Ilya Gerasimov, Marina Mogilner, Sergei Glebov; with the participation of Alexander Semenov. - Kazan: Ab Imperio, 2017. - 21 cm. - (Journal library: "Ab Imperio").
