= Yaroslav Hrytsak =

Ukrainian historian

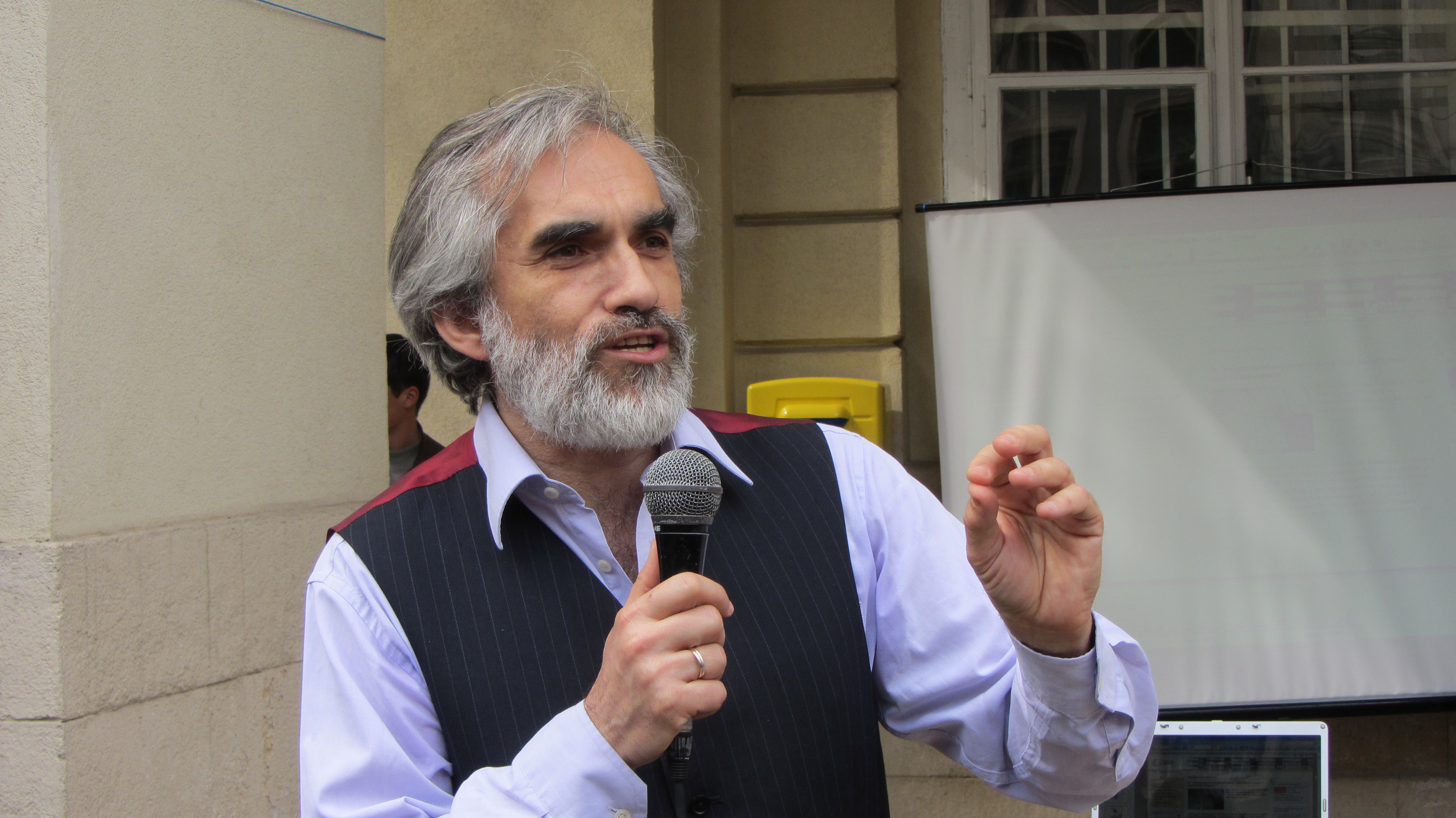
- Born: January 1, 1960 (age 66); Dovhe, Lviv Oblast, Ukrainian SSR
- Education: University of Lviv
- Occupations: Historian, professor

Yaroslav Yosypovych Hrytsak (Ukrainian: Ярослав Йосипович Грицак; born 1 January 1960) is a Ukrainian historian, Doctor of Historical Sciences and professor at the Ukrainian Catholic University. He is also the director of the Institute for Historical Studies of Ivan Franko National University of Lviv.

== Education ==
Hrytsak was born on 1 January 1960 in the village of Dovhe, which was then part of the Ukrainian SSR in the Soviet Union.

He earned his PhD in 1987 at the University of Lviv. Hrytsak passed his habilitation in 1996. He has been director of the Institute for Historical Research, at the Ivan Franko National University of Lviv since 1992.

In 1998 he won an award of "Przegląd Wschodni" for the best foreign book on Eastern Europe. For his book about Ivan Franko he won the Antonovych prize for Intellectual Achievements and the "Best Book in Ukraine" from the leading Ukrainian magazine Кореспондент and the Jerzy Giedroyc Award (founded by Maria Curie-Skłodowska University) in 2014.

== Works ==
He is chief editor of the scholarly journal "Ukraine Modern" and is a member of the editorial board of the journals Ab Imperio, Critique, and Slavic Review, and a member of the supervisory board of Harvard Ukrainian Studies.

He is an honorary professor of National University of Kyiv-Mohyla Academy. He was a guest professor (1996-2009) at Central European University in Budapest and was First Vice-President (1999-2005) of the International Association of Ukrainians.

Since 2015 he has been a member of the Competition Commission, which was specifically designed to select and nominate candidates for the position of the Director of the National Anti-Corruption Bureau of Ukraine (NABU).

== Views ==
He has also been the co-chair of the German‑Ukrainian Historical Commission. However, in October 2019, the Ambassador of Ukraine to Germany, Andriy Melnyk accused Hrytsak and the commission of silence and not communicating regarding the debate in the German Bundestag over recognizing the Holodomor as a genocide. In response, Hrytsak publicly rejected Melnyk's accusations, saying that he had never refused to communicate with Melnyk, and affirmed that every Ukrainian member of the commission, including himself, believed the Holodomor was a genocide but the German members of the commission had reservations about using the term genocide. In further interviews with Deutsche Welle, Hrytsak then publicly crticized the German Foreign ministry's argument that the Holodomor could not be considered genocide and called their arguments "meaningless".

Since the start of the 2022 Russian invasion of Ukraine, he has argued that peace cannot be negotiated without Ukraine, and that Ukrainians must reject any U.S.-Russia deal that excludes Ukraine. He framed the war as a "war of attrition", and stressed that the most decisive factor for a peace deal needs to be guarantees for Ukrainian security.

== Books ==
- The Spirit that Moves to Battle... A political portrait of Ivan Franko (1856–1916) (Lviv, 1990, in Ukrainian)
- Essays in Ukrainian History: Making of Modern Ukrainian Nation (Kyiv, 1996, in Ukrainian) (Polish translation: Historia Ukrainy 1772–1999. Narodziny nowoczesnego narodu)
- Ukraine: The Forging of a Nation, 2022 (English translation: 2023)

== See also ==
- Handbook on history of Ukraine
- List of Ukrainian literature translated into English
