= Handbook on the History of Ukraine =

1993 book about Ukrainian history

Handbook on the History of Ukraine (Ukrainian: Довідник з історії України, romanized: Dovidnyk z istoriji Ukrajiny) is a multi-volume comprehensive encyclopedic book about the history of Ukraine. There were at least two editions published by Kyiv publisher "Geneza" which specializes in publishing school handbooks. The first edition was published in 1993–99, the second in 1999. The authors of the handbook are Ihor Pidkova and Roman Shust. The web version also provides electronic copies of Ukrainian historical outlines from such Ukrainian historians like Natalia Yakovenko and Yaroslav Hrytsak.

== See also ==
- Encyclopedia of Ukraine
- Encyclopedia of Modern Ukraine
