= George Grabowicz =

Ukrainian-American professor of Ukrainian literature

- Григорій Грабович
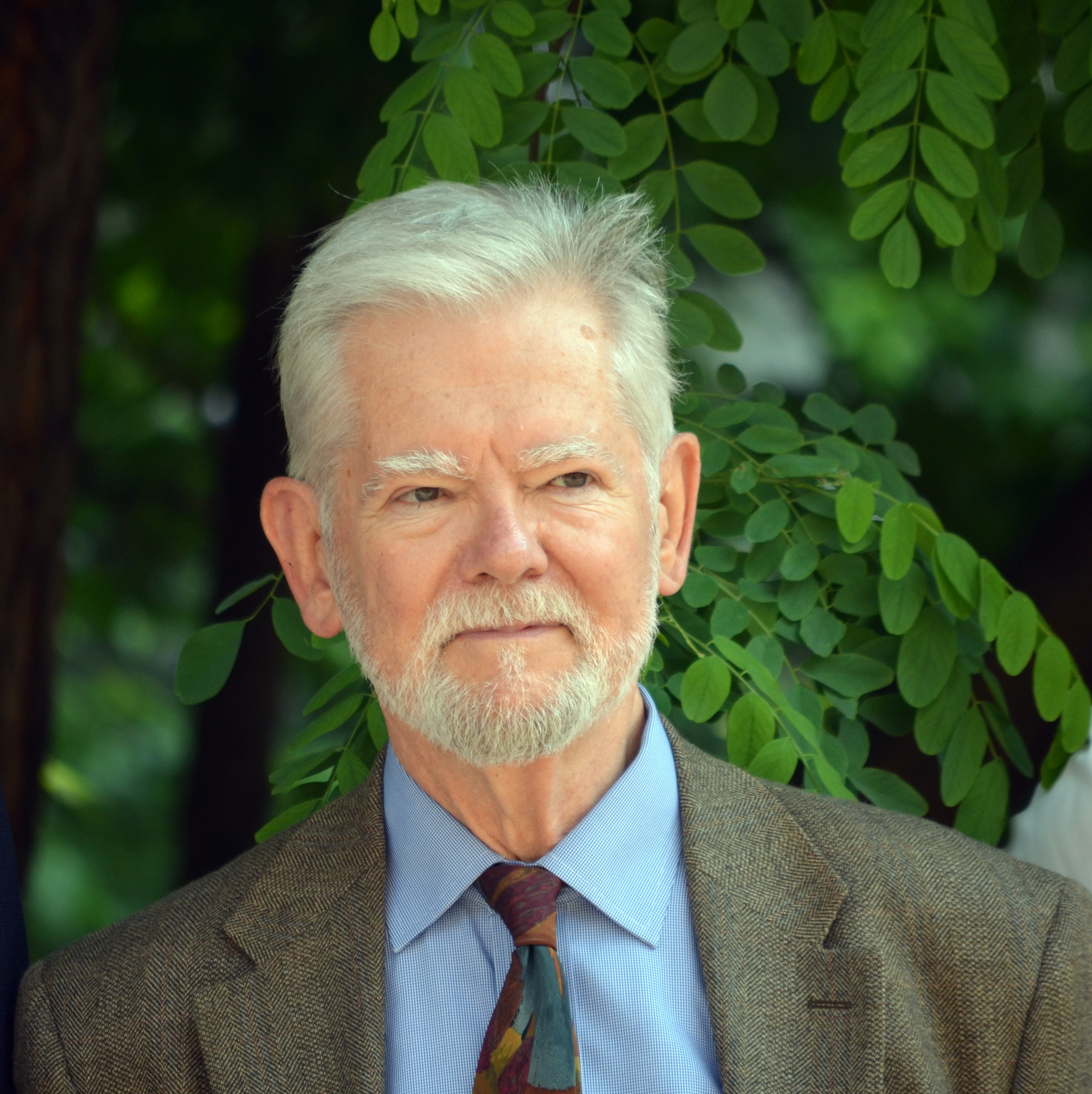
- Born: October 12, 1943 (age 83); Kraków, General Government
- Occupations: Academic, professor, literary critic
- Title: Dmytro Chyzhevs'kyj Professor of Ukrainian Literature at Harvard University

Academic background
- Education: Yale University
- Alma mater: Harvard University

Academic work
- Era: 20th century
- Discipline: Ukrainian literature
- Institutions: Harvard Ukrainian Research Institute
- Main interests: Taras Shevchenko, Pavlo Tychyna
- Notable works: The Poet as Mythmaker: A Study of Symbolic Meaning in Taras Ševčenko
- Website: george-grabowicz.faculty.slavic.fas.harvard.edu/home

George Gregory Grabowicz (Ukrainian: Юрій Григорій Юлійович Грабович, romanized: Hryhorii Yuliiovych Hrabovych; born October 12, 1943) is a Ukrainian and American literary critic and professor in the Department of Ukrainian Literature at both the Harvard Ukrainian Research Institute and Davis Center for Russian and Eurasian Studies.

He is a founder and editor-in-chief of the Krytyka magazine since 1997. His research concerns the history of Ukrainian, Polish, and Russian literature and their interrelationships. His special research focus are Ukrainian writers Taras Shevchenko and Pavlo Tychyna. In 2012–2018, he was the chairman of the Shevchenko Scientific Society in the USA. He was the president and one of the founders of the International Association of Ukrainian Studies.

== Awards ==
- Honorary doctor of the Taras Shevchenko National University of Kyiv (1997)
- Order "For Intellectual Courage" (2004)
- Antonovych prize (2008)
- Shevchenko National Prize (2022)

== Links ==
- G. Grabowicz website at Harvard University
- G. Grabowicz in the Internet Encyclopedia of Ukraine
- A Biographical Sketch about G.Grabowicz
