= Frank Sysyn =

American historian of Ukrainian origin

- Франк Сисин
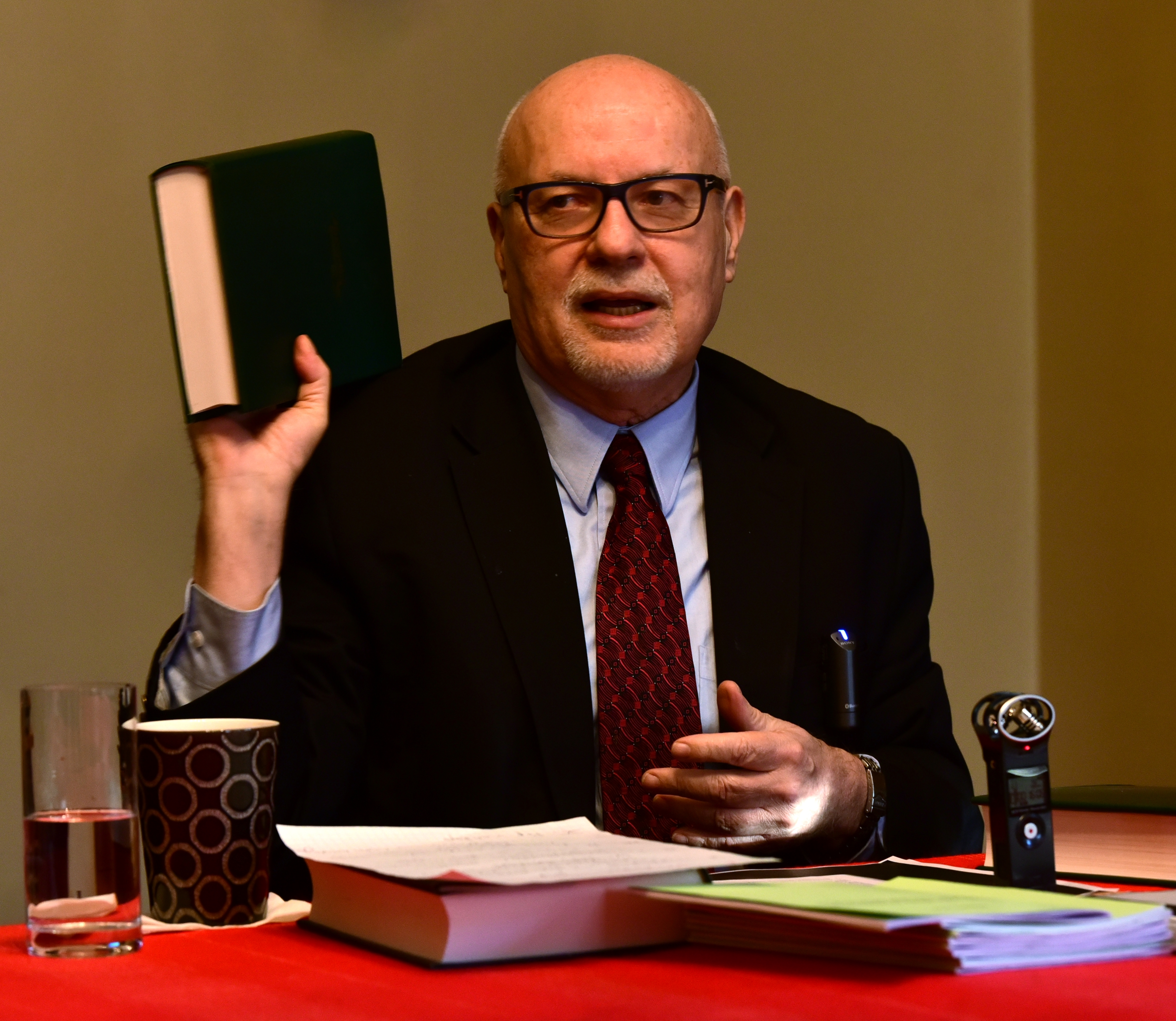
- Frank Sysyn 2018
- Born: December 27, 1946 (age 79); Passaic, New Jersey, U.S.
- Occupation: Historian

Frank Edward Sysyn (Note: Ukrainian: Франк Едвард Сисин, romanized: Frank Edvard Sysyn) (born December 27, 1946) is an American historian of Ukrainian origin. His grandmother was from Ukraine.

Sysyn was born in Passaic, New Jersey. He graduated from Princeton University (1968), the University of London (1969), and Harvard University (Ph.D., 1976), taught at Harvard University (1976–85), and was an associate director of the Harvard Ukrainian Research Institute (1985–8). He was appointed the first director of the Petro Jacyk Centre for Ukrainian Historical Research at the Canadian Institute of Ukrainian Studies (CIUS) in 1989, University of Alberta, in Edmonton, Alberta, and has served as editor-in-chief of its Hrushevsky Translation Project, which is preparing and publishing an English-language translation of Mykhailo Hrushevsky’s 10-volume Istoriia Ukraïny-Rusy. He served as an acting director of the CIUS in 1991–93 and currently serves as the head of the Toronto Office of the CIUS. He is also actively engaged with the development of the Ukrainian Studies Program at the Harriman Institute of Columbia University in New York as well as the Ukrainian Free University in Munich.

== Partial bibliography ==
Books

- Between Poland and the Ukraine: The Dilemma of Adam Kysil, 1600–1653. Cambridge: Harvard Ukrainian Research Institute, 1985.
- Mykhailo Hrushevsky: Historian and National Awakener. Saskatoon: Heritage Press, 2001.

Pamphlets

- Nestor Makhno and the Ukrainian Revolution. "Offprint Series No. 4." Cambridge: Harvard Ukrainian Research Institute, 1977.
- Russia or the Soviet Union? Cambridge: Harvard University, Ukrainian Studies Fund, 1979.
- The Ukrainian Orthodox Question in the USSR. Cambridge: Harvard University Ukrainian Studies Fund, 1987. ISBN 0940465027.

Articles

- "The Changing Image of the Hetman." Jahrbuecher fuer Geschichte Osteuropas, Vol. 46, No. 4 (1998), pp. 531–545.
- "Grappling with the Hero: Hrushevs'kyi Confronts Khmel'nyts'kyi." Harvard Ukrainian Studies, Vol. 22 (1998), pp. 589–609.

Published simultaneously in Cultures and Nations of Central and Eastern Europe: Essays in Honor of Roman Szporluk, ed. Zvi Gitelman et al. (Cambridge, 2000).

- "Bohdan Chmel'nyc'kyj's Image in Ukrainian Historiography since Independence." Österreichische Osthefte, Vol. 42, No. 3-4 (2000).
- "Recovering the Ancient and Recent Past: The Shaping of Memory and Identity in Early Modern Ukraine." Eighteenth-Century Studies, Vol. 35, No. 1 (2001), pp. 77–84.
- "Religion Within the Ukrainian Populist Credo: The Enlightened Pastor Mykhailo Zubrytsky." Journal of Ukrainian Studies, Vol. 37, Special Issue: Religion, Nation, and Secularization in Ukraine (2012), pp. 85–96. Canadian Institute of Ukrainian Studies.

Book contributions

- "Nestor Makhno and the Ukrainian Revolution" (Chapter 11). In: Taras Hunchak, ed., The Ukraine, 1917–1921: A Study in Revolution, 1977, pp. 271–305.
- "The Third Rebirth of the Ukrainian Autocephalous Orthodox Church and the Religious Situation in Ukraine, 1989-1991." In: Seeking God: The Recovery of Religious Identity in Orthodox Russia, Ukraine, and Georgia. DeKalb: Northern Illinois University Press, 1993.
- "The Social Causes of the Khmel'nyts'kyi Uprising." In: Samuel Baron and Nancy Shields Kollmann, eds., Religion and Culture in Early Modern Russia and Ukraine. DeKalb: Northern Illinois Press, 1997, pp. 52–70.
- "The Union of Brest and the Question of National Identity." In: Hans-Joachim Torke, ed., 400 Jahre Kirchenunion von Brest (1596–1996). Berlin, 1998.
- "Introduction to Mykhailo Hrushevsky's History of Ukraine-Rus'." In: Thomas Sanders, ed., History of Imperial Russia: The Profession and Writing of History in a Multinational State. Armonk, NY; London, 1999.
- "The Ukrainian Famine of 1932-3: The Role of the Ukrainian Diaspora in Research and Public Discussion." In: Levron Chorbajian and George Shirinian, eds., Studies in Comparative Genocide. New York; London, 1999.
- "The Image of Russia in Early Eighteenth-Century Ukraine: Hryhorii Hrabianka's Diistvie." In: Robert O. Crummey, Holm Sundhaussen, and Ricarda Vulpius, eds., Russische und Ukrainische Geschichte, vol. 16-18 Jahrhundert. Wiesbaden: Harrassowitz Verlag, 2001, pp. 243–250.

Conference proceedings

- "The Ukrainian Famine of 1932-33: The Role of Ukrainian Diaspora in Research and Public Discussion." In: Problems of Genocide: Proceedings of the International Conference on Problems of Genocide (April 21–23, 1995, National Academy of Sciences, Yerevan, Armenia). Cambridge & Toronto: Zoryan Institute, 1997, pp. 74–117.
