= Mikhail Minakov =

Ukrainian political scholar and historian

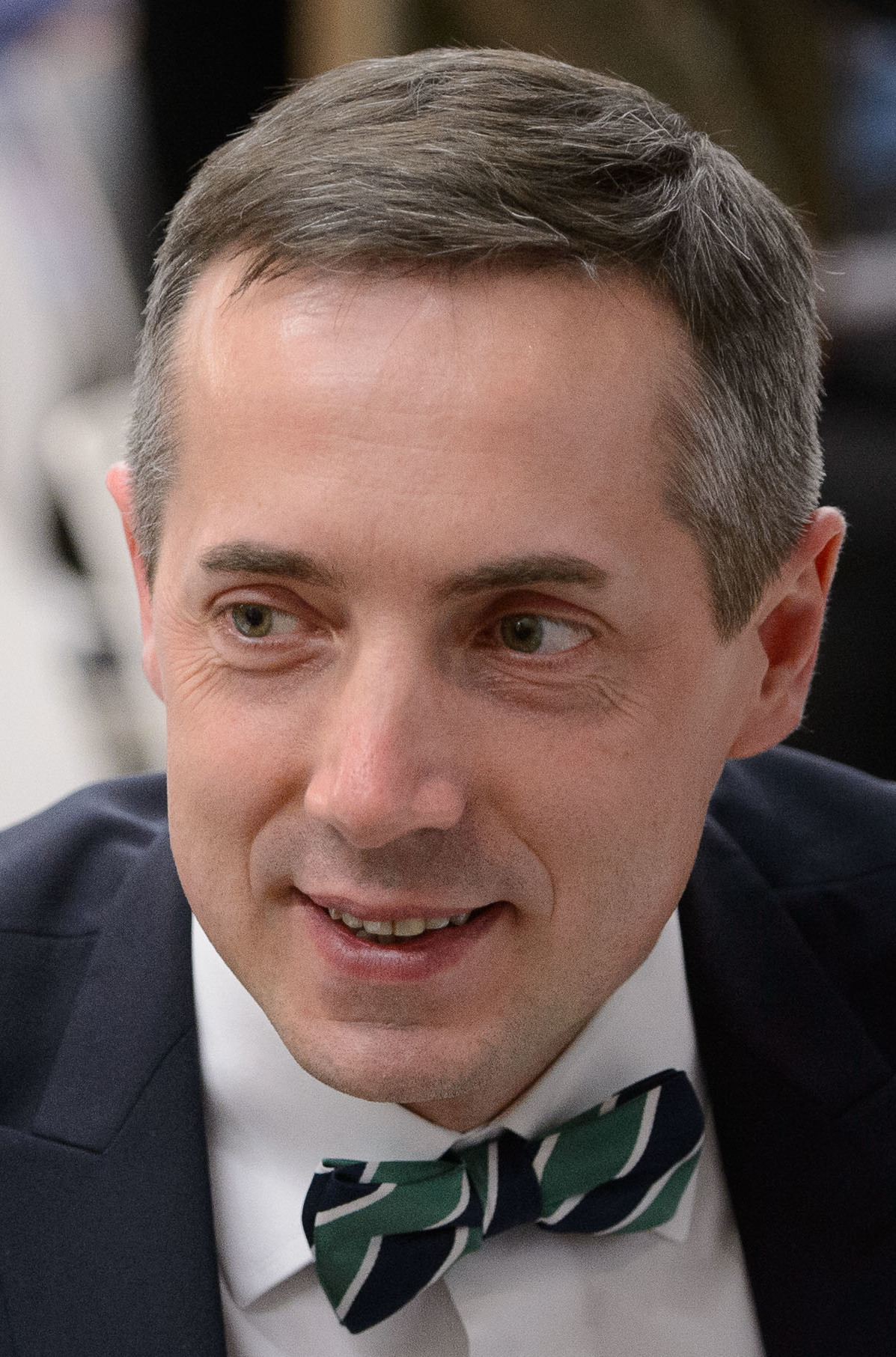
- Born: October 6, 1971 (age 54); Leninsk, Volgograd obl., Russia/USSR
- Occupation(s): philosopher, political scholar and historian
- Honours: Doctor of Philosophy

Mikhail Minakov (Ukrainian: Михайло Анатолійович Мінаков; born on 6 October 1971) is a philosopher, political scholar and historian (researcher of the history of modernity and post-Soviet ideologies), Doctor of Philosophy. His studies focus on human experience, social knowledge, the phenomenon of ideology, political creativity, and the history of modernization.

He is also head of the Ukrainian Research Program at the Kennan Institute (since 2018), professor of philosophy and religious studies at the Kyiv-Mohyla Academy in 2008-2018, chairman of the Kant Society in Ukraine (2013–18), editor-in-chief of the journal Ideology and policy.

== Early life and education ==
Minakov was born in the vicinity of Volgograd, Russia/USSR. His parents were teachers. They moved to the village of Vidradne in Zaporizhia Oblast, Ukrainian SSR/Ukraine, in 1973.

He graduated from the Zaporizhzhya Medical School in 1990 and worked as a village feldsher in the same oblast. As a student, he started studying history, sociology and archeology at Zaporizhzhya State University. In 1992, Minakov was accepted into Kyiv-Mohyla Academy where he studied philosophy, political science, sociology and comparative literature.

== Career ==
In 2001, Minakov received his degree at the Skovoroda Kyiv Institute of Philosophy of the National Academy of Sciences of Ukraine. After that, he joined Kyiv-Mohyla Academy (Kyiv, Ukraine) as assistant professor. In the same year, he published his first book.

From 1998 to 2018, he taught at the Kyiv-Mohyla Academy, at the same time working in international educational and development programs.

In 2007, he was promoted to the post of Associate Professor and published his second book History of the Concept of Experience. That year Minakov received his degree of Doctor of Philosophy in the Skovoroda Institute of Philosophy.

Between 2010 and 2014, Minakov cooperated with several Western universities and research centers: Harvard University (visiting scholar in 2010 and 2013, visiting professor in 2012), Greifswald University (visiting professor in 2010 and 2014).

In 2011, Minakov became an Editor-in-Chief of a scholarly peer-reviewed journal Ideology and Politics.

Since 2016, he has been teaching at the Viadrina European University (Germany).

Since 2017, Minakov has been working at the Kennan Institute at the Woodrow Wilson International Center for Scholars. His theoretical works and empirical research focus on the problems of ideology, political imagination, pluralistic ontology and human historicity.

== Social activities ==
- UNDP Goodwill Ambassador to Ukraine (2017-2018);
- Senior Researcher and Editor-in-Chief Kennan Focus Ukraine (since 2017);
- Member of the Academic Council of the Center for Eastern European Studies and International Relations in Berlin (since 2017);
- Member of the Russian Free Historical Society (since 2014);
- Chairman of the Kant Society in Ukraine (since 2013);
- Member of the board, Institute of Criticism, member of the editorial board, Krytyka (since 2010);
- Member of the editorial board, "Ukrainian Humanitarian Review" (since 2004);
- Member, then chairman of the IRF Translation Project Program Board (2005-2008);
- Chairman, then a member of the board of the Association of USUPS Alumni (2006-2011);
- Member of the organizing committee of the Eastern Group of Donors, European Foundation Center (2008);
- Member of the board of the Ukrainian Forum of Philanthropists (2007-2008);
- Member of the management board, Eastern European Network of Leaders (Council of Europe project in Ukraine, Moldova, Georgia, Armenia and Azerbaijan) (2008-2010).

== Private life ==
Minakov lives in Kyiv and Milan.

He is married for the second time and he has a daughter.

His hobbies are photography, numismatics, sports.

== Bibliography ==
Author of five books and more than a hundred articles on political and cultural analysis, philosophy and history.

- Minakov, Mikhail (2022). "Sovereignty as a Contested Concept: The Cases of Trumpism and Putinism". Inventing Majorities: Ideological Creativity in Post-Soviet Societies. Stuttgart: ibidem-Verlag. ISBN 9783838216416.
- Development and Dystopia. Studies in post-Soviet Ukraine and Eastern Europe (in English), Stuttgart: ibidem, 2018.
- Minakov M. and Rabkin Y. (editors) Demodernization: Future in the Past, Stuttgart: ibidem, expected: April 2018.
- Kant’s Applied Enlightenment (in Russian), in: Neprikosnovennyi Zapas, #1, 2016.
- A Decisive Turn? Risks for Ukrainian Democracy After the Euromaidan, in: Carnegie Regional Insight, Carnegie Endowment for International Peace, February 3, 2016.
- 'Post-Soviet parliamentarian drama: a view from ‘the gods’ in Kiev, in: openDemocracy, February 23, 2016.
- Minakov M. Leopolis. City event (Ukrainian: Леополіс. Подія міста) // Matsevko I., Mudry M. (emphasis added) In the city hall of Lviv. From mayors to mayors. Lviv: GVS, 2016. 5-6.
- Minakov M. The De-Modernization Current: An Approach to Understand Ethical and Political Challenges of Post-Soviet Societies, Global Political Theory and “Charitas in Veritate”, Lviv: USU (2016), 36–49.
- New Ukrainian Exceptionalism (in Eng, in co-authorship with Matt Rojansky), in: Yale Global, 23 June 2015.
- The Event Of Primary Experience And Philosophy. Metatheory Of Experience In Kant And Quine’s Epistemologies (in Ukr.), Sententiae, 2015, #2, 64-74.
- Minakov M. Moses und Prometheus. Die Ukraine zwischen Befreiung und Freiheit, Transit, Nr. 44 (2013), pp. 55-70.
- Minakov M. Transformation of philosophical education in Ukraine in 1986-1995 // Philosophical education in Ukraine: history and modernity: [collective monograph / Tkachuk ML ... [etc.]; National University "Kyiv-Mohyla Academy". - Kyiv: [Agrar Media Group], 2011. - p. 192-228.
- Dictionary of Misprints, in Russian: Толковый словарь опечаток (Kyiv, Tsekh, 2008, second edition: Kyiv, Tsekh, 2010).
- History of the Concept of Experience, in Ukrainian: Історія поняття розуму (Kyiv, Centr praktychnoyi filosofii, 2007).
- Kant’s Teaching on Faith of Reason, in Ukrainian: Вчення Канта про віру розуму (Kyiv, Centr praktychnoyi filosofii, 2001).
