= Olena Apanovych =

Ukrainian historian (1919–2000)

Olena Apanovych Shevchenko National Prize laureate
- Олена Михайлівна Апанович
- Born: November 9, 1919; Melekes, Simbirsk Governorate (now Dimitrovgrad, Ulyanovsk Oblast), Russia
- Died: February 21, 2000 (aged 80); Kyiv, Ukraine

Olena Mykhaylivna Apanovych (Ukrainian: Олена Михайлівна Апанович; 9 November 1919 – 21 February 2000) was a Ukrainian historian, a researcher of Zaporozhian Cossackdom. She was an Antonovych prize recipient.

== Biography ==
Olena Apanovych was born in Melekes, Simbirsk Governorate (now Dimitrovgrad, Ulyanovsk Oblast), Russia, into the family of a railroad clerk. Her relatives recount her mother giving birth to Olena in a railroad car. Her father was of Belarusian peasant stock (hence the Belarusian last name Apanovich) and her mother was of small-time Polish nobility ancestry. She spent all her childhood in Manchuria, northeastern China, where her father worked. Her family was deported from China by the Japanese. They settled in Kharkiv in 1933, where Olena finished high school. Olena's mother died soon after and her father was suppressed in 1939 by false accusations.

In 1937, she entered the "All-Union Institute of Journalism" in Moscow, but the school was soon closed and Apanovych returned to Kharkiv where she graduated from the Pedagogical Institute (Faculty of Russian language and literature) shortly before the beginning of the Second World War. After the onset of the German invasion, she was evacuated to Kazakhstan and Bashkiria. From May 1944, Olena worked in the Central State Archive of Ukraine in Kyiv as a researcher and prepared many historical documents for publishing.

In 1950, Apanovych defended her dissertation for the Candidate of Sciences degree (roughly equivalent to a Ph.D.) on the Zaporozhian Cossacks' participation in the Russo-Turkish War of 1768–1774. She then joined the Institute of History of the Academy of Sciences of Ukraine as a leading expert on Cossackdom. During the period of 1950–72, she led archaeological expeditions to places connected with Zaporozhian Cossack history, published many scientific works, and made a full register of Zaporozhian Cossack memorials.

From 1972, after being fired for political reasons from the Institute of History, Apanovych worked in the Central Scientific Library of the Academy of Science of Ukraine, making significant contributions in manuscript research. In the early 1980s, she was often invited to be a historical consultant for documentary and fiction films on Ukrainian Cossackdom.

== Awards and honours ==
- 1991, Apanovych became a member of the Writer's Union of Ukraine
- 1994, awarded the prize named after T.Shevchenko
- 1995, Antonovych prize (USA)

== Bibliography ==
- Apanovych Biography on the Museum of dissident movement site, (in Ukrainian)
- Lyudmyla Tarnashynska, "55 years «under the sign of Clio».", Dzerkalo Tyzhnia, (The Weekly Mirror), September 4–10, 2004.
