= Bogumiła Berdychowska =

Polish writer and journalist

Bogumiła Berdychowska-Szostakowska
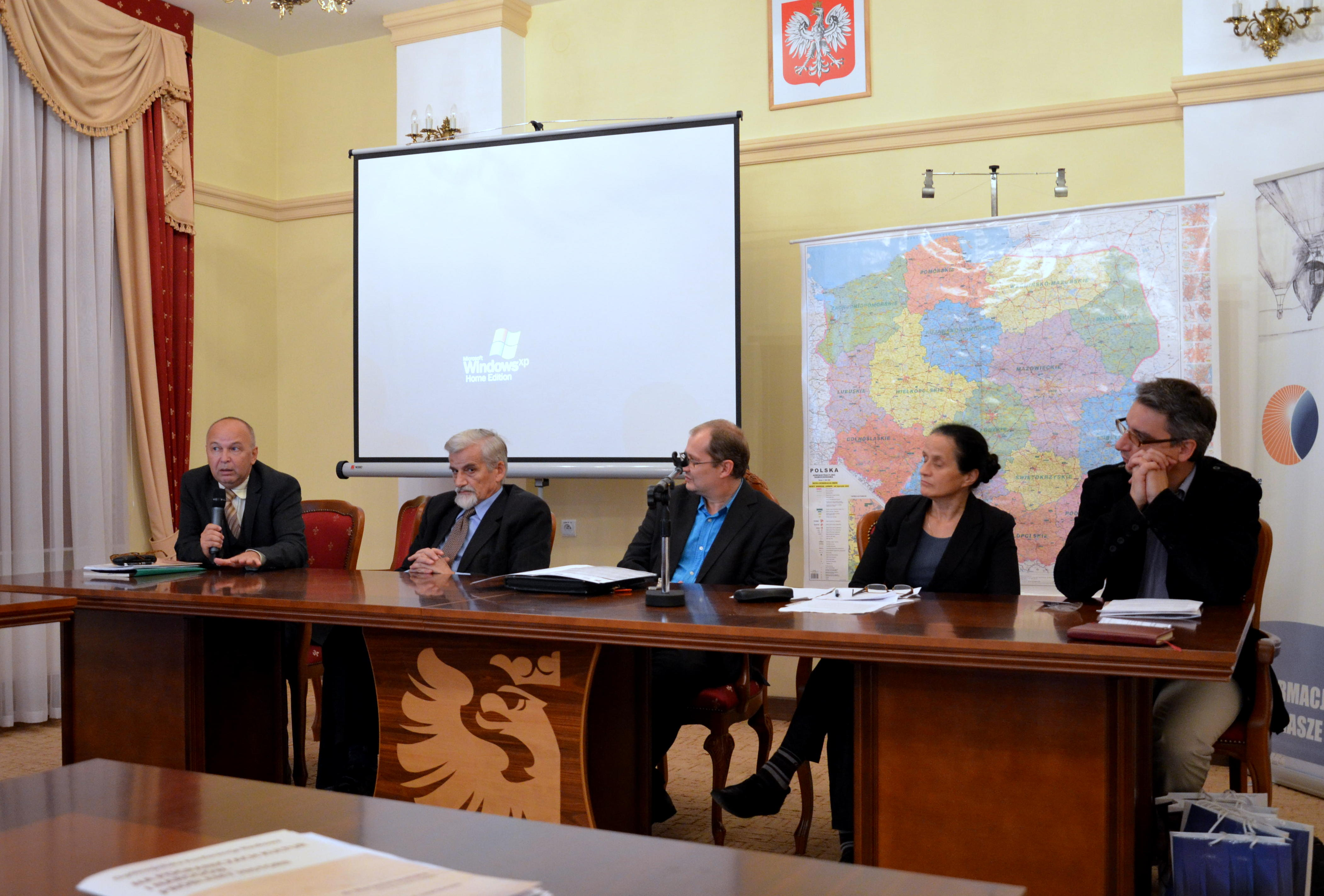
- Born: January 10, 1964 (age 62)
- Occupation: journalist

Bogumiła Berdychowska-Szostakowska (born 10 January 1964) is a Polish writer and journalist, often writing about the Polish minorities in the former USSR and their history.

She was the director of the Bureau of National Minorities in the Polish Ministry of Art and Culture (1989–1994), and the vice-director of Polskie Radio (1994–2002). Since 2003, she has been the Director of the stipends department in Narodowe Centrum Kultury (National Center of Culture). She was in charge of coordinating the Polish-Ukrainian youth exchange. Author of publications in Tygodnik Powszechny and Więzi, among others. In 2014, she co-founded and was a member of the Civic Committee for Solidarity with Ukraine (KOSzU).

Berdychowska is also a member of the Civic Committee of the Solidarity with Ukraine (KOSzU).

== Awards ==
- Order of Princess Olga, 3rd class (Ukraine, 2009)
- Antonovych prize (2010)
- Order of Polonia Restituta, Officer's Cross (2012)

== Works ==
- "Juszczenko", Tygodnik Powszechny, Nr 18, 6 May 2001
