= Natalia Yakovenko =

Ukrainian historian

- Наталя Миколаївна Яковенко
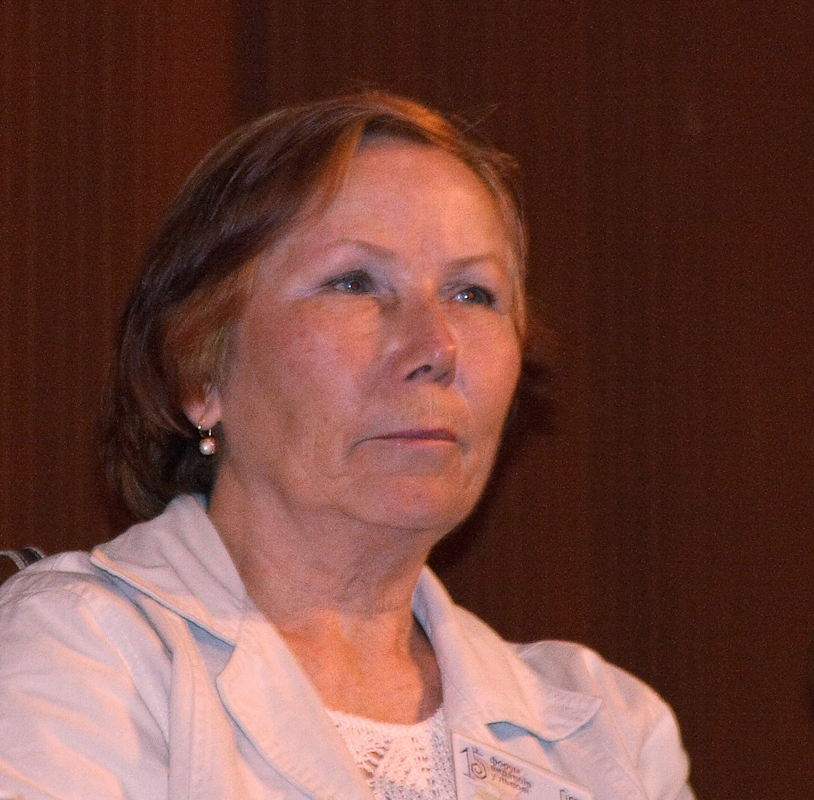
- Yakovenko in 2008
- Born: 1942 (age 83–84); Aprelivka, Ukraine
- Education: University of Lviv
- Known for: Research on Latin-language documents, history of Ukrainian gentry
- Awards: Doctor honoris causa, Ukrainian Catholic University (2020); Order of Liberty (Ukraine) (2026)
- Scientific career
- Fields: History, Latin linguistics, Paleography, Ukrainian gentry studies
- Workplaces: Central State Historical Archive of Ukraine; Taras Shevchenko National University of Kyiv; Institute of History of Ukraine, NASU; Institute of Ukrainian Archaeography and Source Studies, NASU; National University of Kyiv-Mohyla Academy

Notes
- Member of the first senate of Ukrainian Catholic University (2002–2005)

Natalia Mykolaivna Yakovenko (Ukrainian: Наталя Миколаївна Яковенко; born 1942) is a Ukrainian historian and professor, known for her expertise in Latin linguistics and her contributions to the National University of Kyiv-Mohyla Academy. Yakovenko's promotion of Ukrainian szlachta as a genuine part of the country's historical narrative had a significant influence on historical studies in Ukraine following the country's independence.

== Education and research career ==
Born in Aprelivka, a village in central Ukraine, Yakovenko graduated with a degree in classics from the University of Lviv in 1967. Following her graduation, she joined the Central State Historical Archive of Ukraine as a researcher. Her academic career progressed when she became a lecturer at the Taras Shevchenko National University of Kyiv in 1981.

In 1987, Yakovenko took a senior research position at the Institute of History of Ukraine under the National Academy of Sciences of Ukraine (NASU). Four years later, in 1991, she was appointed chair of the NASU Institute of Ukrainian Archaeography and Source Studies. She earned her doctorate in historical sciences in 1994 and became chair of the NASU Department of History in 1995.

Since 1992, Yakovenko has served as a professor at the National University of Kyiv-Mohyla Academy. Her research focuses on the paleography of Latin-language documents in Ukraine and the history of the Ukrainian gentry.

Yakovenko was a member of the first senate of the Ukrainian Catholic University (UCU) from 2002 to 2005. In 2020, the UCU awarded her the title of Doctor honoris causa, the highest honor the university confers, in recognition of her contributions to education, culture, art, and ministry.

On 15 July 2026 Yakovenko was awarded the Order of Liberty by President Volodymyr Zelenskyy.

== Bibliography ==
- Myronova, V., Yakovenko, N. Textbook of Latin language.
- Yakovenko, N. Ukrainian nobility from the end of 14th century to the mid of 17th century. Ed.1. Naukova dumka. Kyiv 1993.
- Yakovenko, N. Ukrainian nobility from the end of 14th century to the mid of 17th century. Ed.2. Krytyka. Kyiv 2008. ISBN 966-8978-14-5.
- Yakovenko, N. Outline of history of Ukraine from Ancient times to the end of 18th century . Ed.1. Heneza. Kiev 1997. ISBN 966-504-021-9.
- Yakovenko, N. Outline of history of Ukraine from Ancient times to the end of 18th century . Ed.2. Krytyka. Kyiv 2005. ISBN 966-7679-73-X.
- Yakovenko, N. Outline of history of Ukraine from Ancient times to the end of 18th century . Ed.3. Krytyka. Kyiv 2006. ISBN 966-7679-82-9.
- Yakovenko, N. Parallel world. Research on the history of representations and ideas in Ukraine in the 16th-17th centuries. Krytyka. Kyiv 2002. ISBN 966-7679-23-3.
- Natalya Yakowenko. An Outline of History of Medieval and Early Modern Ukraine. Third Revised and Enlarged Edition. Krytyka. Kyiv 2006. ISBN 966-7679-82-9.
- Yakovenko, N. Introduction to History. Krytyka. Kyiv 2007. ISBN 966-8978-17-X.
- Yakovenko, N. Mirror of identity. Research on history of representations and ideas in Ukraine in the 17th century - beginning of 18th centuries. Laurus. Kyiv 2012. ISBN 978-966-2449-20-4.
- Natalia Yakovenko. In Search of a New Heaven. The Life and Texts of Ioanikii Galiatovskii. Laurus. Krytyka. Kyiv 2017. ISBN 978-966-2449-93-8.
- Natalia Yakovenko. Grace and Retribution. Miraculous Icons of the Blessed Mother in 17th- & 18th-century Ukraine. Krytyka. Ukrainian Catholic University Press. Kyiv – Lviv 2026. ISBN 978-966-2789-32-4.

== See also ==
- Handbook on history of Ukraine
