= Zenon Kohut =

Canadian historian (born 1944)

- Зенон-Євген Когут
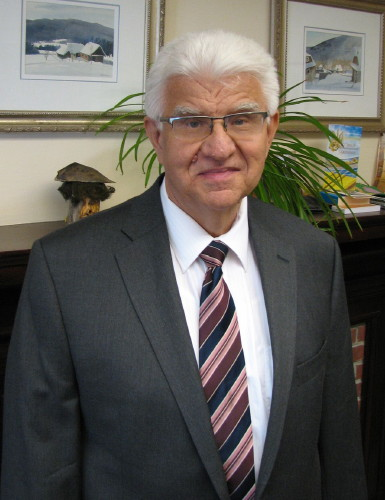
- Born: 18 January 1944 (age 82); Yaniv, District of Galicia, General Governorate (now Ivano-Frankove, Ukraine)
- Education: University of Pennsylvania
- Occupations: Historian; Professor Emeritus
- Known for: History of Ukraine

Zenon Eugene Kohut (Note: Ukrainian: Зенон-Євген Когут, romanized: Zenon-Ievhen Kohut) (born January 18, 1944) is a Canadian historian specializing in early modern Ukrainian history. He retired as professor emeritus, University of Alberta. From 1992 to 2014 Kohut worked at the University of Alberta's Canadian Institute of Ukrainian Studies where he served as the first head of the Stasiuk Program for the Study of Contemporary Ukraine and acted as editor of the Journal of Ukrainian Studies (1990–92). He was acting director (1993) and director (1994–2012) of the Program.

== Personal background ==
Zenon Kohut was born in Yaniv, District of Galicia, General Governorate (now Ivano-Frankove, Ukraine) in the Galicia region. After the Second World War, Kohut's parents emigrated with him as political refugees to the United States and settled in Philadelphia.

== Educational background ==
Zenon Kohut attended La Salle College in Philadelphia (BA 1966) and the University of Pennsylvania (MA 1970, PhD 1975).

== Professional background ==
During the years 1973–75 and 1977–78 Kohut was a research associate at the Harvard Ukrainian Research Institute and Harvard University's Russian Research Center. In between his Harvard stints he taught Russian and Ukrainian history at the University of Pennsylvania (1975–6). He then taught at Michigan State University (1979–80), Yale University (Visiting Professor 1988) and the University of Alberta where he held the rank of Professor of History. Dr. Kohut also worked as editor of the American Bibliography of Soviet and East European Studies (1980–84) and as a senior research analyst at the Library of Congress (1984–89). Government work and he spent time at the U.S. Department of Defense as a Soviet political affairs analyst (1990–92).

== Published works ==
- Kohut, Zenon. Russian Centralism and Ukrainian Autonomy. Imperial Absorption of the Hetmanate, 1760s–1830s, Harvard University Press, 1989. ISBN 9780916458171
- Kohut, Zenon. Making Ukraine Studies on Political Culture, Historical Narrative, and Identity, Canadian Institute of Ukrainian Studies Press, 2011. ISBN 978-1894865227
- Historical Dictionary of Ukraine (with Bohdan Y. Nebesio and Myroslav Yurkevich), Lanham and London, 2005. ISBN 9780810853874
- Korinnia identychnosti:Studii z rannoomodernoi ta modernoi istorii Ukrainy (Roots of Identity: Studies on Early Modern and Modern Ukraine), Kyiv: Krytyka Press, 2004).ISBN 9789667679484
- Culture, Nation, and Identity: The Ukrainian-Russian Encounter (1600-1945). Edited by Andreas Kappeler, Zenon E. Kohut, Frank E. Sysyn, and Mark von Hagen. Edmonton: Canadian Institute of Ukrainian Studies Press, 2003. ISBN 978-1895571462
- History as a Battleground: Russian-Ukrainian Relations and Historical Consciousness in Contemporary Ukraine Saskatoon: Heritage Press, 2002. ISBN 978-0888804242
- "The Question of Russo-Ukrainian Unity and Ukrainian Distinctiveness" in Early Modern Ukrainian Thought and Culture, Kennan Institute Occasional Paper #280 (Washington, DC: Woodrow Wilson Center, 2001)
- Rosiis'kyi tsentralizm i ukrains'ka avtonomiia. Likvidatsiia Het'manshchyna. (Russian Centralism and Ukrainian Autonomy: The Abolition of the Hetmanate). Kyiv, Osnovy Press, 1996.ISBN 9781895571103
- Co-edited Early Modern Ukraine. Special issue of the Journal of Ukrainian Studies, vol. 17, nos.1-2 (Summer–Winter, 1992)

== Articles ==
- “Pereiaslavs’ka uhoda ta ideia spokonvichnykh prav Ukrainy v politychnii ta istorychnii dumtsi Het’manshchyny” (The Pereiaslav Agreement and the Concept of Perpetual Rights of Ukraine in the Political and Historical Thought of the Hetmanate) Ukrains’kyi arkheohrafichnyi shchorichnyk (Ukrainian Archeographic yearbook), Vol. 13/14 (Kyiv, 2006): 291–297.
- “Tsarstvo, dynastiia, ta etnos: Dva rann’omoderni pohliady na rosiis’ku istoriiu” (Tsardom, Dynasty, and Etnos: Two Early-Modern Views of Russian History), Materialy V kongresu Mizhnarodnoi asotsiatsii ukrainistiv. Istoriia: Zbirnyk naukovykh statei. (Materials of the Fifth Congress of the International Association of Ukrainianists. History: Collection of Scholarly Articles), Part 2 (Chernivtsi, 2004): 51-55
- “Ot Iafeta do Moskvy: protsess sozdaniia bibleiskoi rodoslovnoi slavian v pol’skoi, ukrainskoi i russkoi istoriografii (XVII-XVIII vv.)” (From Japhet to Moscow: The Process of Establishing a Biblical Genealogy of the Slavs in Polish, Ukrainian, and Russian Historiography [XVII-XVIII vv.]), Ukraina i sosednie gosudarstva v XVII veke. Materialy mezhdunarodnoi konferentsii (Ukraine and Neighboring States in XVII century. Materials of an International Conference). (St. Petersburg, 2004): 59-82
- “A Dynastic or Ethno-Dynastic Tsardom? Two Early Modern Concepts of Russia,” Extending the Borders of Russian History: Essays in Honor of Alfred J. Rieber, edited by Marsha Siefert. (Budapest: Central European University Press, 2003) pp. 17–30.
- “The Khmelnytsky Uprising, the image of Jews, and the shaping of Ukrainian historical memory,” Jewish History, 17, no. 2 (2003), pp. 141–163.
- “The Question of Russo-Ukrainian Unity and Ukrainian Distinctiveness in Early Modern Ukrainian Thought and Culture,” Culture, Nation, and Identity: The Ukrainian-Russian Encounter (1600-1945), pp. 57–86.
- “Origins of the Unity Paradigm: Ukraine and the Construction of Russian National History (1620-1860),” Eighteenth-Century Studies 35, no. 1 (2002), pp. 70–76; A Russian-language version of this article also appeared in Ab Imperio, no. 1-2 (2001), pp. 73–85.
- “The Image of Jews in Ukraine’s Intellectual Tradition: The Role of Istoriia Rusov, “in Zvi Gitelman, Lubomyr Hajda, John-Paul Himka, and Roman Solchanyk eds., Cultures and Nations of Central and Eastern Europe: Essays in Honor of Roman Szporluk. (Cambridge, MA, 2000), pp. 343-358.
- “In Search of Early Modern Ukrainian Statehood: Post-Soviet Studies of the Cossack Hetmanate,” Journal of Ukrainian Studies, 24, no. 2 (Winter 1999) [actually published in the Spring 2002], pp. 101–112.
- “Zustrich z Rosiyeiu: kul'turni tendentsii ta politychni pohliady v rann'ovovitnii Ukraiini,” (Encounters with Russia: Cultural Tendencies and Political Views in Early Modern Ukraine) Suchasnist' 9 (1996, Kyiv), pp. 67–76 (in Ukrainian).
- “Ukrainian-Russian Relations in Historical Perspective,” Europe 3 (1996, Beijing), pp. 79–97 (in Chinese).
