= Great Ukrainian Encyclopedia =

Ukrainian encyclopedia

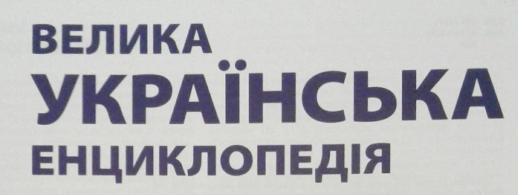
- Title on the title page of Volume 1 (2016)
- Original title: Велика українська енциклопедія
- Language: Ukrainian
- Subject: General
- Genre: encyclopedia
- Publication place: Ukraine
- Media type: printed and online versions
- ISBN: 978-617-7238-39-2
- Website: https://ev.vue.gov.ua/

The Great Ukrainian Encyclopedia (GUE; Ukrainian: Велика українська енциклопедія, ВУЕ, romanized: Velyka ukraínska entsyklopediia, VUE) is a Ukrainian encyclopedia published since 2013 by the State Research Institution "Encyclopedia Press" (former Main Editorial Office of the Ukrainian Soviet Encyclopedia) according to two decrees of the President of Ukraine under the auspices of the National Academy of Sciences of Ukraine. As of 2022, the vol. 1 was published (2016), the vols. 2 and 3 are ready for publication (in 2021 they were published on the “Encyclopedia Press” website in pdf format) as well as a separate volume "Ukraine: 30 years of Independence. A Short Reference Guide". The head of the project is the director of "Encyclopedia Press" Alla Kyrydon. The head of the editorial board is the full member of the National Academy of Sciences of Ukraine Vadym Loktiev.

== Origins ==
On January 2, 2013, the President of Ukraine Viktor Yanukovych issued a decree No. 1/2013 "On the Great Ukrainian Encyclopedia" in which he stated: "to support a proposal of the National Academy of Sciences of Ukraine to create and publish a Great Ukrainian Encyclopedia in 2013–2020." According to this decree the former Mykola Bazhan All-Ukrainian State Specialized Publisher "Ukrainian Encyclopedia" (Всеукраїнське державне спеціалізоване видавництво «Українська енциклопедія» імені М. П. Бажана) was reorganized and renamed to the State Research Institution "Encyclopedia Press". On January 12, 2015, the President of Ukraine Petro Poroshenko issued a decree No. 7/2015 "On the Creation and Publication of the Great Ukrainian Encyclopedia" which made changes to the previous decree. According to this document, the new encyclopedia had to be published offline as well as online in 2013–2026. In 2013–2014 the project was led by a historian Yuri Shapoval. In 2014–2015, the acting director of "Encyclopedia Press" was a historian Volodymyr Kryvosheia. Since 2015, the director of "Encyclopedia Press" and head of the project is Prof. Alla Kyrydon.

== Preliminary and methodological publications ==
Since 2015, "Encyclopedia Press" has published 14 lists of proposed terms for the encyclopedia as discussion papers. Each list is focused on a certain academic discipline. In particular, the institution published the lists of terms on: Biology; Medicine; Geoscience; Physics; Philosophy, Logic, Ethics, and Esthetics; Architecture; Social Science; Linguistics; History of Ukraine and World History; Law; Religious Studies; Sports; Political Science; Education. Since 2015 the institution also published guidelines for authors of the Great Ukrainian Encyclopedia and several collected volumes on the history of encyclopedias, process of creation of encyclopedias, etc.

== Web version ==
In 2018, the web version of the Great Ukrainian Encyclopedia was launched on the website vue.gov.ua. It contains expanded versions of its articles with and their audio versions for hearing-impaired persons.
