= Harvard Ukrainian Research Institute =

Research institute affiliated with Harvard University devoted to Ukrainian studies

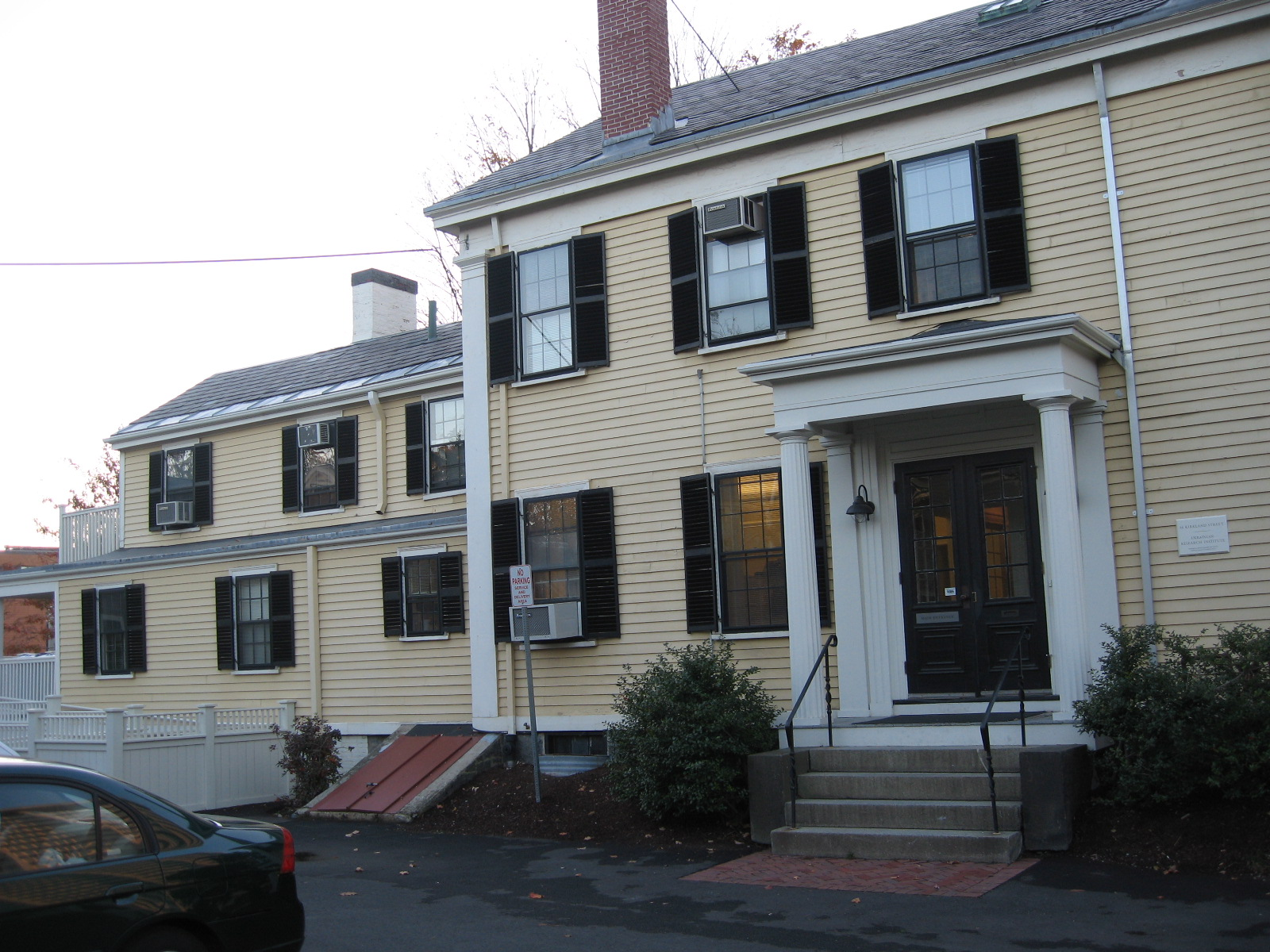
- Abbreviation: HURI
- Formation: June 1973; 53 years ago
- Type: Non-profit
- Purpose: To advance knowledge of Ukraine; Establishment of Ukrainian Studies
- Headquarters: Cambridge, Massachusetts, United States
- Coordinates: 42°24′N 71°06′W
- Official languages: English
- Director: Serhii Plokhii
- Parent organization: Harvard University
- Website: huri.harvard.edu official URL

The Harvard Ukrainian Research Institute (HURI) is a research institute affiliated with Harvard University devoted to Ukrainian studies, including the history, culture, language, literature, and politics of Ukraine. Other areas of study include sociology, archaeology, art, economics, and anthropology.

== History ==
HURI was formally founded in 1973 by Omeljan Pritsak and other leading scholars in Ukrainian studies. It functions as a focal point for undergraduate and graduate students, fellows, and professors and provides assistance with their research. Prior to the establishment of HURI, its founders organized weekly seminars in Ukrainian studies.

HURI maintains one of the largest collections of Ukrainian books and other media available in the West, both in its own collection and in those stored in the Harvard Library. HURI also manages the Harvard Ukrainian Summer Institute, which offers summer courses in Ukrainian language, history, literature, and culture, as part of the Harvard Summer School. The institute publishes the Harvard Ukrainian Studies journal—founded in 1977—and a series of book publications, including the Harvard Series in Ukrainian Studies, the Harvard Library of Early Ukrainian Literature, and Harvard Papers in Ukrainian Studies.

In the mid-1950s, a group of student activists and members of the Ukrainian-American community sought to preserve Ukraine's unique culture and history, which were suppressed in Soviet Ukraine and unfamiliar to political and intellectual establishments in the West.

Under the guidance of Omeljan Pritsak at Harvard, the group's general goal was shaped into a vision for three endowed chairs in Ukrainian studies at a major university, along with a research institute to support and broaden the scholarship. With the assistance of the Ukrainian Studies Fund, the Ukrainian studies program was established with three endowed professorships in the departments of History and Slavic Languages and Literatures at Harvard University, beginning on January 22, 1968, the 50th anniversary of Ukraine's first proclamation of independence.

On 25 February 2022, in the face of the Russian invasion of Ukraine, HURI issued a statement against the Russian military invasion and in support of Ukraine and Ukrainians.

In 2026, the institute was declared an undesirable organization in Russia.

== Selected publications ==
Periodicals

- Harvard Ukrainian Studies (1977–present)

Vol. 1, No. 1 - Vol. 36, No. 3
ISSN 0363-5570

Books

- Grabowicz, George. The Poet as Mythmaker: A Study of Symbolic Meaning in Taras Ševčenko (1982)
- Sysyn, Frank. Between Poland and the Ukraine: The Dilemma of Adam Kysil, 1600–1653 (1985)
- Kohut, Zenon. Russian Centralism and Ukrainian Autonomy: Imperial Absorption of the Hetmanate 1760s-1830s (1988)

Pamphlets and Offprint Series

- Nestor Makhno and the Ukrainian Revolution "Offprint Series No. 4" (1977)

Sources and Documents Series

- Nonconformity and Dissent in the Ukrainian SSR 1955-1975: An Annotated Bibliography, compiled by George Liber and Anna Mostovych (1978) ISBN 0916458016
- The Ukrainian Experience in the United States: A Symposium, edited by Paul R. Magocsi (1989)
