= Battle of Vyshgorod =

1173 conflict in the Kievan succession crisis

Siege of Vyshgorod
- Part of the 1171–1173 Kievan succession crisis
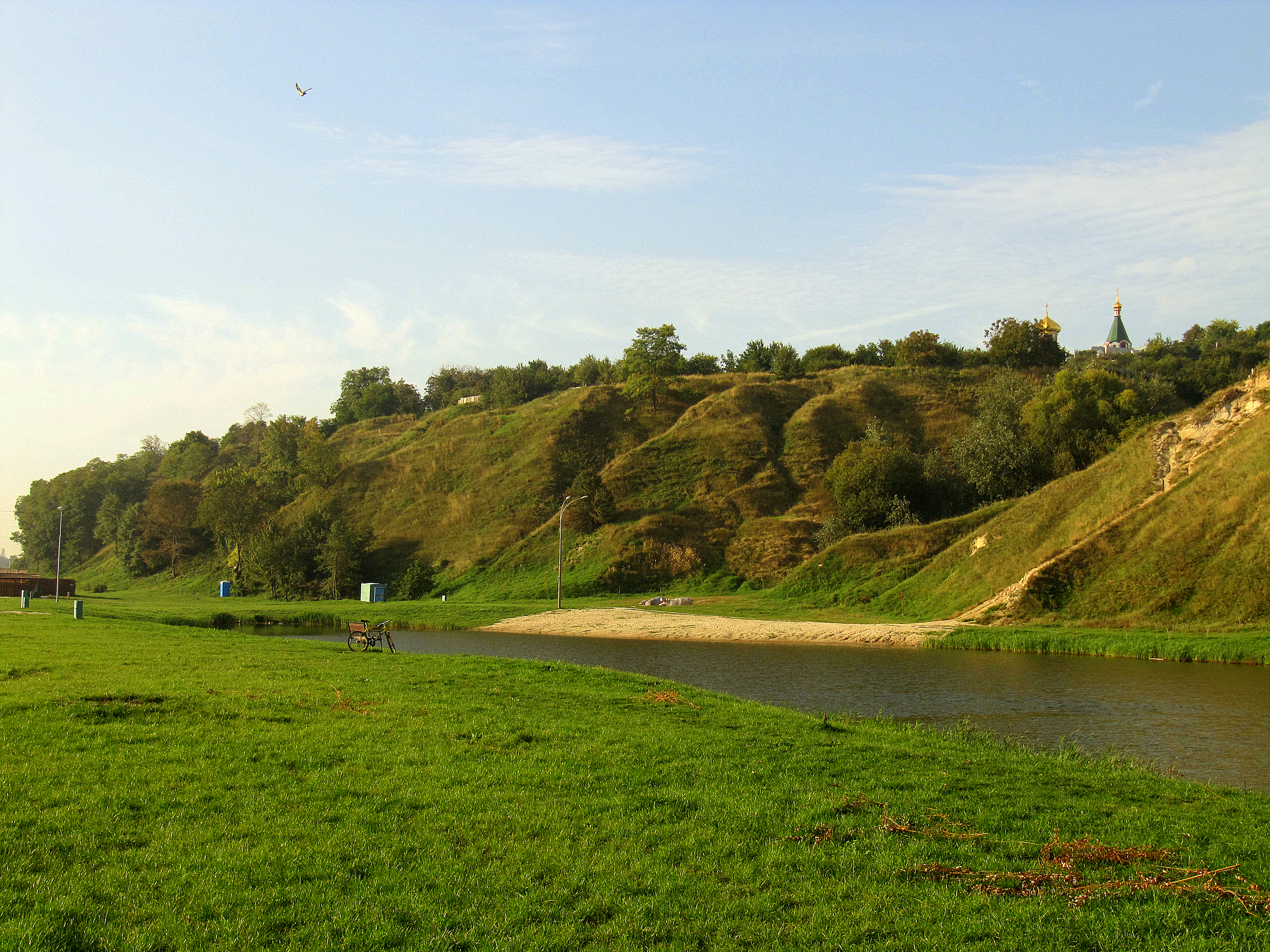
- Former Vyshgorod hill fortress site (pictured 2012)
Date	8 September – 18/19 December 1173
Location	near Vyshhorod, Kievan Rus' 50.598570°N 30.500440°E
Result	Kiev and allies victory; defeat of Andrey Bogolyubsky's coalition

Belligerents
Andrey's coalition: Vladimir-Suzdal; Chernigov; Smolensk; Pereyaslavl; Smolensk (partly); Polotsk; Goroden; Turov; Murom; Ryazan; Novgorod Republic	Кiev and allies: Kiev; Smolensk (partly); Reinforcements: Volhynia; Galicia? (Note: The composition of these reinforcements is unclear in the Kievan account, where 'Yaroslav of Lutsk' came 'with all the land of Volyn'' (Volhynia). Earlier it stated that 'David [Rostislavich] had gone to Galič to Jaroslav to get help', which would indicate Yaroslav Osmomysl, prince of Galicia r. 1153–1187, not Yaroslav Iziaslavich of Lutsk. Remarkably, the Suzdalian Chronicle claims: '[David Rostislavich] went for help to Galich. And they did not give him help.' So perhaps the reinforcements brought by Yaroslav Iziaslavich of Lutsk consisted only of Volhynians, and not Galicians, although the latter are never said to have rejected help in the Kievan version.)

Commanders and leaders
Yurievichi (Suzdalia): Yury Bogolyubsky; Mikhalko Yurievich; Vsevolod "the Big Nest" Olgovichi (Chernigov): Sviatoslav Vsevolodich Rostislavichi (Smolensk): Yaropolk Romanovich (forced by Andrey)	Rostislavichi (Smolensk): Mstislav Rostislavich; Rurik Rostislavich; Davyd Rostislavich Iziaslavichi (Volyn/Lutsk): Yaroslav Iziaslavich Olgovichi (Chernigov): Sviatoslav Vsevolodich (switched sides near end (Note: The Kievan Chronicle is somewhat unclear how Yaroslav made a deal with Sviatoslav. It first says the Olgovichi (Sviatoslav) were unwilling to give Kiev to Yaroslav; therefore, he abandoned the Olgovichi and made a deal with the Rostislavichi instead. Yet, after the battle, when Yaroslav has entered Kiev and taken the throne as the new grand prince (with Rostislavichi support), Sviatoslav sends messages to him complaining that they had reached an agreement that whoever of them two would reign in Kiev would compensate the other by giving them territory. Evidently, they did reach an agreement, which Sviatoslav then accused Yaroslav of breaking.))

Strength
50,000 (per Kievan Chronicle, probably exaggerated)	Unknown

The battle and siege of Vyshgorod (modern Vyshhorod) took place in late 1173, during the 1171–1173 Kievan succession crisis. Commanding another broad coalition army, prince Andrey Bogolyubsky of Vladimir-Suzdal launched a second campaign against Kiev (modern Kyiv), capital city of Kievan Rus'. After the conquest and sack of Kiev in March 1169 by an earlier coalition assembled by Andrey, his brother Gleb of Pereyaslavl had been installed as the new grand prince, only to die under suspicious circumstances in January 1171. A series of princes briefly reigned in Kiev thereafter, with Andrey usually managing to put his preferred candidates on its throne, until his brother Vsevolod "the Big Nest" was driven out by the Rostislavichi of Smolensk in April 1172, enthroning Rurik Rostislavich. Andrey was most displeased when he heard about this, and assembled another coalition army under his son Yury to militarily enforce his will on Kiev.

The coalition army, consisting of Yurievichi princes of Suzdalia, the Novgorod Republic, Olgovichi of Chernigov (modern Chernihiv) and various princes from present-day Belarus, approached Kiev by crossing the Dnieper from the northeast, where a pitched battle occurred, the indecisive battle of Vyshgorod. The defending Kievans and Rostislavichi then retreated into the medieval hill fortress of Vyshgorod, beleaguered by coalition forces. Reinforcements from the Iziaslavichi of Volhynia relieved them, delivering a crushing defeat upon the northern coalition, which fell apart in the aftermath. The conflict established a new balance of power, definitively breaking the short-lived Kievan overlordship (March 1169 – January 1171) of Andrey, who was assassinated by his own courtiers the next year.

== Background ==
=== Andrey's rise ===
After the death of Yuri Dolgoruky in 1157, Andrey Bogolyubsky ousted his younger brothers Mikhail "Mikhalko" Yurievich and Vsevolod "the Big Nest" from Rostov and Suzdal in 1162, thus uniting his father's patrimony in Vladimir-Suzdal under his sole rule (samovlastets). He expelled his four brothers to the Byzantine Empire together with their mother, Yuri's second wife. He made the city of Vladimir on the Klyazma his capital, fortifying, beautifying and expanding it, while taking up residence in a castle in the nearby village of Bogolyubovo; (Note: Nowadays an urban-type settlement in the Vladimir Oblast of the Russian Federation.) hence his nickname "Bogolyubsky". He made several attempts to subjugate the Novgorod Republic to his power as well (but he would be defeated in 1169/70). In 1164 he unsuccessfully tried to create a church metropolitanate for Suzdalia, separate from Kiev, but was overruled by the patriarch of Constantinople.

=== 1167–1169 Kievan succession crisis ===
Andrey's long-standing rivalry with his Mstislavichi cousins reached its peak when Mstislav Iziaslavich, the son of Iziaslav Mstislavich, his father's long-time enemy, was elected prince in Kiev. At the same time, the Novgorod veche expelled prince Sviatoslav Rostislavich, who turned to Andrey for help. The Novgorodians, in turn, allied themselves with Mstislav. This was the beginning of a bloody internecine war. The princes of Murom, Ryazan, Smolensk, Polotsk, Novgorod-Seversk, Chernigov and Dorogobuzh sided with Andrey. Their combined army laid siege to Kiev in 1169, and upon conquering the capital, they sacked Kiev.

Andrey Bogolyubsky, himself not present at the sacking, had ordered his brother Gleb Yurievich of Pereyaslavl to be installed on the Kievan throne. While some scholars have interpreted these events as signifying that Andrey put a weak puppet in Kiev and made it a vassal of Vladimir-Suzdal, other scholars observed that Gleb's position as prince of Pereyaslavl' meant that he was heir apparent to the throne of Kiev, as well as the most senior Yurievichi prince, thereby restoring the order of succession by agnatic seniority that had been disturbed by Mstislav Iziaslavich. However, Andrey's further attempts to increase his influence in Rus' failed – in 1170, his troops were defeated in the Siege of Novgorod (1170) by the young Novgorod prince, Roman Mstislavich.

=== 1171–1173 Kievan succession crisis ===
Nevertheless, Andrey retained significant power and influence within the realm, enabling him to put some of his allies on several princely thrones of Rus' cities. In 1171 (20 January 1171 according to Jaroslaw Pelenski), Gleb died, probably due to being poisoned, thus triggering yet another succession crisis for the Kievan throne. At the invitation of the younger Rostislavichi of Smolensk, Vladimir Mstislavich (the youngest son of Mstislav the Great) sat down in Kiev, but died soon after. (Note: According to historian Leonid Makhnovets (1989), Vladimir Mstislavich's reign should be dated from 5 February to 10 May 1171, three months and a few days, even though the text says "four months", because incomplete periods of time were customarily rounded up.) Andrey then gave Kiev to the elder Rostislavich, Roman Rostislavich in July 1171. But some time after, (Note: Makhnovets dates this conflict to February 1173.) a conflict arose between them, and Roman was forced to return to Smolensk. Andrey sent his brother, Mikhail "Mikhalko" Yurievich, to Kiev, but he did not want to go to the Rus' land (the region around Kiev), and sent his brother Vsevolod "the Big Nest" and nephew Yaropolk Rostislavich instead. Vsevolod reigned in Kiev for 5 weeks, but a coalition of deposed Rostislavichi and Mstislav Rostislavich of Volhynia successfully recaptured Kiev on 1 April 1172, with Vsevolod being imprisoned by Davyd Rostislavich, and his brother, Rurik Rostislavich, becoming the new grand prince. This way, the junior generation again seized power, upsetting the senior princes including Andrey. When Andrey learned about this, he ordered the Rostislavichi to leave the Rus' land and return to Smolensk. However, they refused and cut the ambassador's beard, which led to the outbreak of hostilities. Senior princes formed another coalition led by Andrey, and marched on Kiev.

== Kiev campaign of 1173 ==
=== Analysis of surviving sources ===
In History of Ukraine-Rusʹ Volume 2 (1899), Ukrainian historian Mykhailo Hrushevsky tentatively reconstructed the events of the Kiev campaign of 1173 in the Kievan Chronicle, remarking that it had 'an epic tone and a pompous, rhetorical style.' Polish historian Jaroslaw Pelenski analysed in 1988 that the 1171–1173 Kievan succession crisis and Kiev campaign of 1173 were 'described in three interrelated narrations incorporated in the Kievan Chronicle:

1. The Beginning of the Princely Reign of Volodimer in Kiev (columns 566–68);
2. The Beginning of the Princely Reign of Roman Rostislavič in Kiev (columns 568–72);
3. The untitled skazanie about the Kiev campaign of 1173, the most extensive of the three (columns 572–78).'

Pelenski noted that the Kievan skazanie is highly partisan, heavily criticising Andrey Bogolyubsky in religious-ideological terms, including Biblical quotations, for being under the influence of the devil, committing the cardinal sin of pride, arrogance, haughtiness, and boasting, for which God supposedly punished him with a humiliating defeat.

By comparison, the Suzdalian Chronicle has very little to say, limiting itself to a few sentences in half a column. (Note: Suzdalian Chronicle, folio л. 123., column 366 (?): 'In the same year, when Prince Andrey heard that his brother was taken by David Rostislavich and his brothers, he sent his son Yuri with the Novgorodians, and with the Rostovians, and with the Suzdalians, and with all his retinue, and with the voivode Boris Zhidislavich, and 20 other princes with their regiments. In Vyshgorod, David barricaded his brother Mstislav, and he himself went for help to Galich. And they did not give him help. Having arrived to Vyshgorod with a large force, they stood near the city 9 weeks. And they did not succeed in anything, and they returned back.') On the one hand, the editor(s) of the Kievan Chronicle apparently had no issues with including ideologically contradictory narratives in its compilation – blaming the 1169 Sack of Kiev ordered by Andrey on the city's inhabitants' own "sins", and glorifying Andrey's piety after his assassination in 1174, but virulently rebuking him for his 1173 Kiev campaign and siege of Vyshgorod – as long as it gave an inclusive history of all of Kievan Rus'. On the other hand, Pelenski argued that the compilers of the Suzdalian Chronicle were much more selective, usually limiting themselves to events concerning Vladimir-Suzdal, and giving them their own political and ideological twists as needed.

The Novgorod First Chronicle (NPL) has an even shorter account than the Suzdalian. The only significant differences include that, according to the NPL, the coalition forces – consisting of only Novgorodians and Rostovians, and mentioning only Andrey's son Yury, then prince of Novgorod – are said to have besieged Vyshgorod for 7 weeks rather than 9, and that the Novgorodian troops 'came back all well to Novgorod', apparently not having suffered heavy casualties, and not saying anything about having been defeated. (Note: Novgorod First Chronicle: 'Knyaz Gyurgi Andreyevits [Yury Bogolyubsky] with the men of Novgorod and of Rostov went to Kiev against the sons of Rostislav [Rostislavichi of Smolensk], and drove them away out of Kiev; and he stood by Vyshegorod seven weeks, and they came back all well to Novgorod; and Yaroslav Izyaslavits [Yaroslav Iziaslavich of Lutsk] took his seat on the throne in Kiev.')

=== Order of battle ===
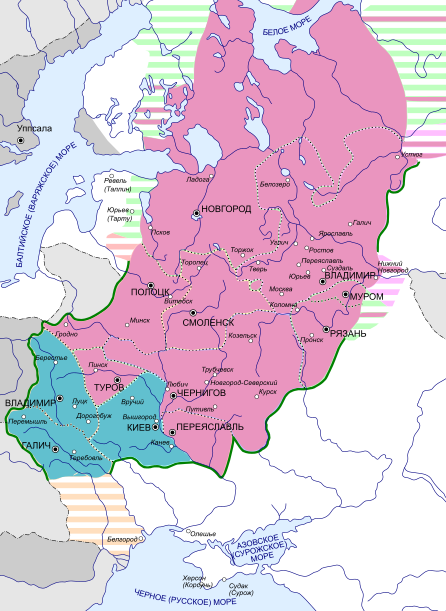
Andrey's coalition Kiev and allies

The Kievan and Suzdalian chronicles agree that the coalition army of Andrey included at least twenty princes, led by his son Yury Bogolyubsky and voivode Boris Zhidislavich. The Suzdalian account specifically mentions the participation of Novgorodians, Rostovians, and Suzdalians; the Novgorod First only Novgorodians and Rostovians. The much more detailed account in the Kievan Chronicle lists 'troops from Rostov, Suzdal', Vladimir, Perejaslavl', Beloozero (Belozersk), Murom, Novgorod, and Rjazan'. And counting them, [Andrey] found there were fifty thousand of them', a number Pelenksi found 'apparently inflated', and Raffensperger & Ostrowski (2023) called 'clearly a typical exaggeration'.

The Kievan Chronicle goes on to narrate that the coalition army marched from Suzdalia, passing by Smolensk; there, its prince Roman Rostislavich 'was forced to send his son with warriors of Smolensk against their brothers, because he did not want to reveal his plans [to Andrej], since he was then under Andrej's power.' Roman thus had plans to turn on Andrey, but had to play along for now. Thereafter, Andrey is said to have ordered the Polotsk princes (or Polovtsi) and the princes of Turov, Pinsk and Goroden (or Gorodets) to go along as well, and then passing by the Olgovichi (probably at Chernigov), they joined forces and all went to Kiev, crossing the Dnieper.

The situation for Kiev was critical. Both Kievan and Suzdalian chronicles state that, when it became known that the enemy army was approaching Kiev, Mstislav decided not to defend the capital, but instead the princely troops locked themselves in neighbouring towns and cities. Rurik sat down in Belgorod (modern Bilhorod Kyivskyi), Mstislav Rostislavich in Vyshgorod, and David went to Galich (modern Halych) to ask for help from 'Yaroslav', although which Yaroslav is unclear, nor whether his appeal was successful or not. The Novgorod First Chronicle briefly confirms that the Novgorod–Rostov forces drove the Rostislavichi away from Kiev, and that a siege of Vyshgorod happened thereafter.

=== Battle and siege of Vyshgorod ===
The Kievan Chronicle goes into some length regarding the combat operations, specifying that once the coalition forces arrived at Vyshgorod, there was pitched battle with the Rostislavichi and Kievans on 8 September.

And when they [Andrey's coalition forces] came up to Vyšgorod, Mstislav Rostislavič saw them coming for war. And he sent his troops and went out onto the river valley against them, for both sides were eager for battle. And the archers met and began to shoot, attacking each other. [Mstislav gave a speech.] The enemies were in three groups: the men of Novgorod and the men of Rostov [on either side], and between them was Vsevolod Jur'evič with his troops. And suddenly Mstislav attacked their troops, and they crushed the center army. And the other forces, seeing that, surrounded them, for Mstislav had come with a small [army] into them (the enemy). And then both sides became confused, and there was great disorder [...]. And so, having fought heavily, they dispersed. Many were wounded but not many were killed. And this was the one battle on the first day at the river valley.

— translation: Lisa L. Heinrich (1977)

Thereafter, the defenders retreated into Vyshgorod, and Andrey Bogolyubsky's troops laid siege to the hill fortress. The description of the actual siege is very brief: 'And they attacked every day and [the others] attacked [them] from the city. They were fighting heavily and many good men of Mstislav's retinue were wounded and killed.' After 9 weeks, they learned that prince Yaroslav Iziaslavich of Lutsk was coming to the city with allied Galician-Volynian forces. After negotiations, his right to Kiev was recognised by the Rostislavichi. Yaroslav also negotiated and reached an agreement with Sviatoslav Vsevolodich, causing the Olgovichi of Chernigov to defect from the coalition to the Kievan side.

On the night of 18 to 19 December, near Vyshgorod, Bogolyubsky's coalition army was completely defeated by Kievans, Volhynians and perhaps Galicians under the command of Mstislav Rostislavich and Yaroslav Iziaslavich. Bogolyubsky's coalition army fled and fragmented, with all groups of soldiers going to their own homes. Andrey's grandiose campaign ended in failure, which meant that he lost power and influence in Kievan Rus'. The Rostislavichi gave the throne of Kiev to the eldest prince of Lutsk, Yaroslav Iziaslavich.

== Aftermath ==
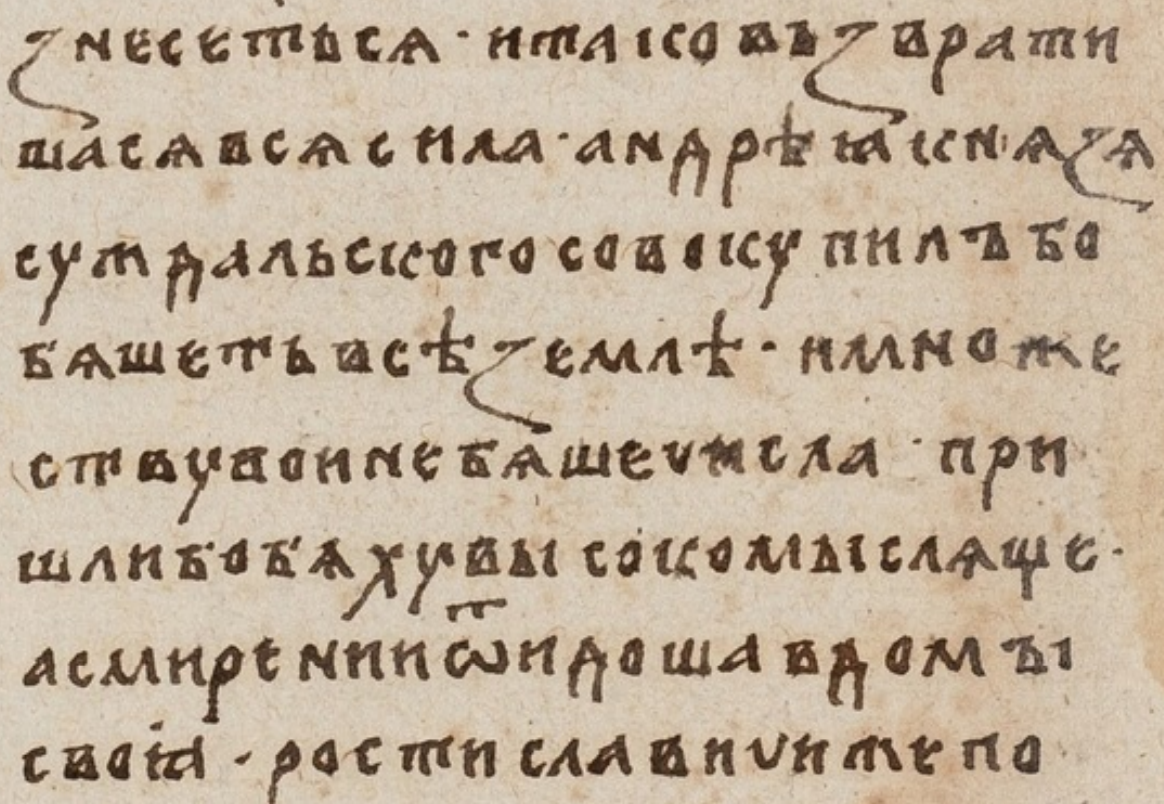
"And so all the forces of Andrej, prince of Suzdal', returned; he had gathered all the land, a countless multitude of warriors. They had come in pride; they went away to their homes in humility." (Note: Pelenski 1988 translated this passage as: "And all the forces of Prince Andrej of Suzdal' returned. He had gathered all the lands and of the multitude of his warriors there was no count. They had come in pride, but departed to their homes humble.") – Kievan Chronicle (English translation by Lisa L. Heinrich, 1977)

The consequence of this battle was the fall of Andrey Bogolyubsky's authority among the inhabitants of Vladimir-Suzdal, as well as among the allied principalities, as the coalition fell apart upon this defeat. This contributed to a successful plot and the assassination of Andrey several months later, on 28 June 1174 by boyars from his own inner circle. His death caused yet another succession crisis to break out, this time within Suzdalia, that would not be resolved until his brother Vsevolod the Big Nest had defeated his brothers, and seized power in 1177.

Unity on the defenders' side did not last long either; once Yaroslav Iziaslavich of Lutsk had been enthroned, he refused to honour his agreement with Sviatoslav Vsevolodich of Chernigov by compensating him with territory. Sviatoslav's Olgovichi army swiftly marched upon Kiev and took it without a fight, while Yaroslav fled back to Lutsk, having reigned only briefly. They reconciled and made peace shortly thereafter.

== See also ==
- 1174–1177 Suzdalian war of succession
- List of wars involving Kievan Rus'
- List of wars involving the Novgorod Republic
- List of wars and battles involving the Principality of Smolensk

== Bibliography ==
=== Primary sources ===
- Kievan Chronicle (c. 1200), sub anno 6682 (1174) [1173]
  - (Church Slavonic critical edition) Shakhmatov, Aleksey Aleksandrovich, ed. (1908). Ipat'evskaya letopis' Ипатьевская лѣтопись [The Hypatian Codex]. Complete Collection of Russian Chronicles (PSRL) (in Church Slavic). Vol. 2 (3rd ed.). Saint Petersburg: Typography of M. A. Aleksandrov / Izbornyk. pp. 285–301.
  - (modern English translation) Heinrich, Lisa Lynn (1977). The Kievan Chronicle: A Translation and Commentary (PhD diss.). Nashville, Tennessee: Vanderbilt University. p. 616. ProQuest 7812419
  - (modern Ukrainian translation) Makhnovets, Leonid (1989). Літопис Руський за Іпатським списком [Rus' Chronicle according to the Hypatian Codex] (in Ukrainian). Kyiv: Dnipro. p. 591. ISBN 5-308-00052-2. — A modern annotated Ukrainian translation of the Kievan Chronicle based on the Hypatian Codex with comments from the Khlebnikov Codex.
- Suzdalian Chronicle (c. 1203), sub anno 6682 (1174) [1173]
  - (Church Slavonic critical edition) Лаврентьевская летопись 6682 [1174] – 6684 [1176] [Laurentian Chronicle 6682 [1174] – 6684 [1176]]. Полное Собрание Русских Литописей [Complete Collection of Russian chronicles]. Vol. 1. Leningrad: Academy of Science (SSSR). 1926–1928. pp. 285–301.
  - "Laurentian Codex 1377" (in Church Slavic and Russian). National Library of Russia. 2012. [digitisation of the Laurentian Codex, including the Suzdalian Chronicle, with a transcription of the Old Church Slavonic text and a translation into modern Russian] – folio л. 123.
- Novgorod First Chronicle (c. 1275), sub anno 6681 (1173)
  - (Church Slavonic Synodal Scroll critical edition) Izbornyk (1950). "Новгородская Первая Летопись Старшего Извода (синодальный Список). В лЂто 6649 [1141] — в лЂто 6688 [1180]" [Novgorod First Chronicle of the Older Edition (Synodal Scroll). In the year 6649 [1141] — in the year 6688 [1180]]. Izbornyk (in Church Slavic). Moscow / Leningrad: Academy of Sciences of the USSR. – digitised version of the late-13th-century Synodal Scroll edition (or "Older Edition") of the Novgorod First Chronicle (Synodalnyy NPL).
  - (modern English translation) Michell, Robert; Forbes, Nevill (1914). The Chronicle of Novgorod 1016–1471. Translated from the Russian by Robert Michell and Nevill Forbes, Ph.D. Reader in Russian in the University of Oxford, with an introduction by C. Raymond Beazley and A. A. Shakhmatov (PDF). London: Gray's Inn. p. 237.

=== Literature ===
- Martin, Janet (2007). Medieval Russia: 980–1584. Second Edition. E-book. Cambridge: Cambridge University Press. ISBN 978-0-511-36800-4.
- Pelenski, Jaroslaw (1988). "The Contest for the "Kievan Succession" (1155–1175): The Religious-Ecclesiastical Dimension". Harvard Ukrainian Studies. 12/13: 761–780. JSTOR 41036344.
- Raffensperger, Christian; Ostrowski, Donald (2023). The Ruling Families of Rus: Clan, Family and Kingdom. London: Reaktion Books. p. 309. ISBN 978-1-78914-745-2. (e-book)
