= Disintegration of Kievan Rus' =

Mid-12th century political fragmentation

The disintegration of the Kievan Rus' was the process of political fragmentation of the Kievan Rus', which in the mid-12th century divided into independent principalities. Formally, the Kievan Rus' continued to exist up to the Mongol invasion (1237–1241), with Kiev considered to be its main city.

The period from the 12th to the 16th century is traditionally known as the appanage period, or as feudal fragmentation in Soviet Marxist historiography. The boundary of the disintegration is considered to be 1132 — the year of the death of the last powerful Kievan prince Mstislav the Great. The next stage of disintegration was the liquidation of the institution of "communion in the Russian land" as a result of the Mongol invasion: the cessation of the struggle for Kiev and the Kievan volosts, collective ownership and defense of the Kievan land by princes of various branches of the Rurikids. Its final completion falls on the second half of the 13th century, when the previous structure of almost all ancient Russian lands seriously changed, the power of Lithuania and Poland began to spread to their western part, and they thereby lost their dynastic unity.

The result of the disintegration was the emergence of new political entities on the site of Kievan Rus', and the remote consequence was the formation of modern peoples: Russians, Ukrainians, and Belarusians.

== Causes of disintegration ==
The period of disintegration is usually interpreted not simply as the infighting between the descendants of Rurik, but as a result of an increase in boyar landownership. Some historians believe that at the first stage (in the pre-Mongol period), fragmentation did not mean the end of the existence of the Old Russian state.

=== Brewing of the crisis ===
The first threat to the integrity of the country arose immediately before the death of Vladimir Sviatoslavich. Vladimir ruled the country by seating his 12 sons in the main cities. The eldest son Yaroslav, seated in Novgorod, refused to send tribute to Kiev even during his father's lifetime. When Vladimir died (1015), an internecine war began, ending with the death of all of Vladimir's sons, except Yaroslav and Mstislav of Tmutarakan. The two brothers divided the "Russian land", which was the core of the Rurikids' possessions, along the Dnieper. Only in 1036, after the death of Mstislav, did Yaroslav begin to rule the entire territory of Rus' alone, except for the isolated Principality of Polotsk, where the descendants of another son of Vladimir — Izyaslav — established themselves from the end of the 10th century. The Polotsk princes were later mentioned in the Russian chronicles as "Rogvolozhi vnutsi" (Rogvolod's grandchildren).

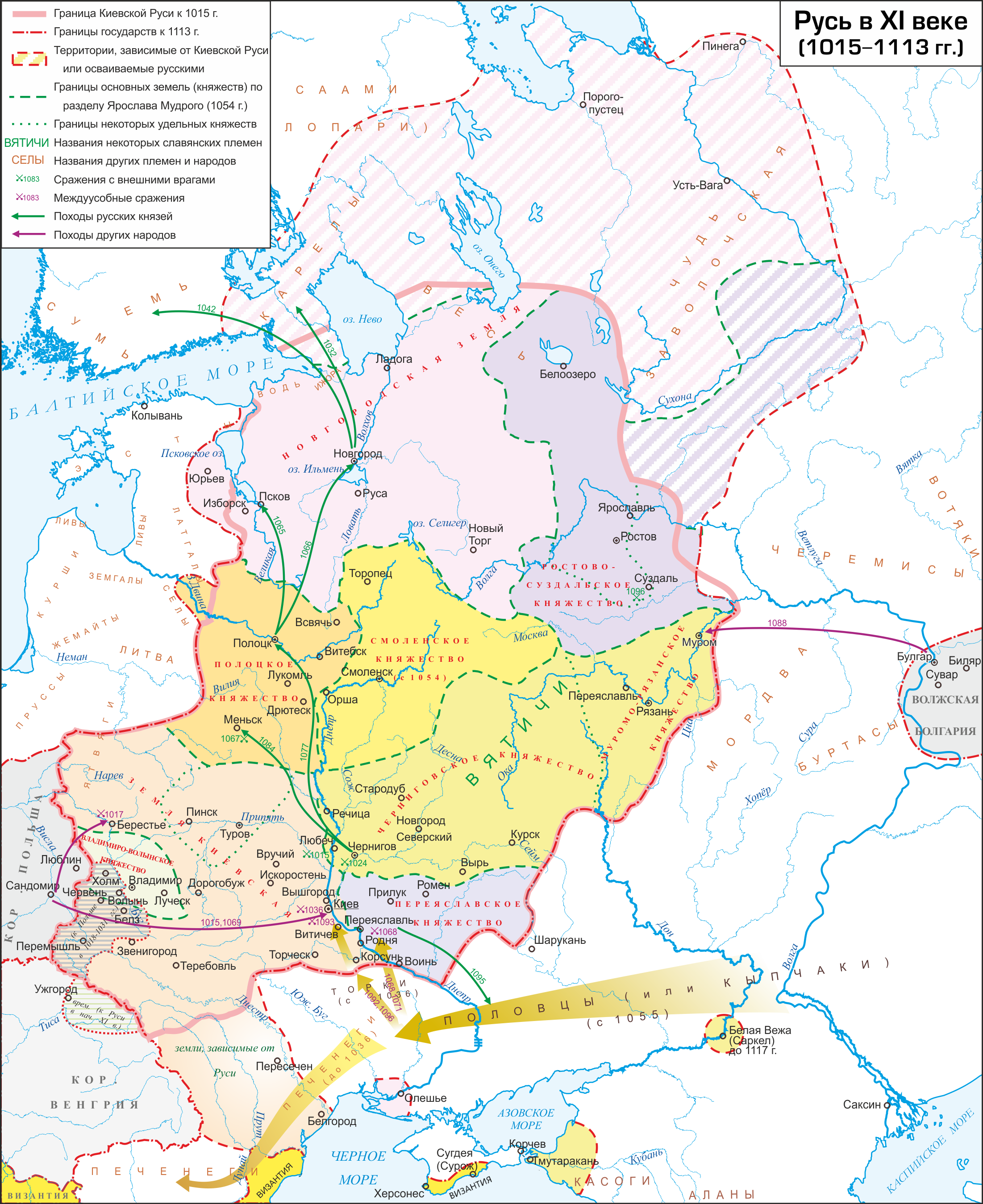
Rus' in the 11th — early 12th centuries

After the death of Yaroslav in 1054, Rus' was divided in accordance with his testament among his five sons. The eldest Izyaslav received Kiev and Novgorod, Sviatoslav — Chernigov, Ryazan, Murom and Tmutarakan, Vsevolod — Pereyaslav and Rostov, to the younger ones, Vyacheslav and Igor — Smolensk and Volhynia. The established order of succession to the princely thrones received the name "rota system" in modern historiography. Princes moved alternately from throne to throne in accordance with their seniority. With the death of one of the princes, the lower ones moved one step up. But, if one of the sons died before his parent and did not have time to visit his throne, then his descendants were deprived of the rights to this throne and became "izgoi" (outcasts). On the one hand, this order prevented the isolation of lands, since princes constantly moved from one throne to another, but on the other hand, it generated constant conflicts between uncles and nephews.

In 1097, on the initiative of Vladimir Monomakh, the next generation of princes gathered for a council in Liubech, where it was decided to end the internecine wars and a new principle was proclaimed: "let each hold his patrimony". Thus began the process of creating regional dynasties.

Kiev, according to the decision of the Liubech council, was recognized as the patrimony of Sviatopolk Izyaslavich (1093–1113), which meant the preservation of the tradition of inheriting the capital by the genealogically senior prince. The reign of Vladimir Monomakh (1113–1125) and his son Mstislav (1125–1132) became a period of political stabilization, and almost all parts of Rus', including the Principality of Polotsk, once again found themselves in the orbit of Kiev.

Mstislav passed the Kievan reign to his brother Yaropolk (1132–1139). The latter's intention to fulfill the plan of Vladimir Monomakh and make Mstislav's son Vsevolod his successor, bypassing the younger Monomakhovichi — the Prince of Rostov Yuri Dolgorukiy and the Prince of Volhynia Andrey — led to a general internecine war, characterizing which, the Novgorod chronicler wrote in 1134: "And the whole Russian land was torn apart".

== First century of fragmentation ==
Rus' in 1237 on the eve of the Mongol invasion

By the middle of the 12th century, Kievan Rus' was divided into 13 (according to other estimates from 15 to 18) principalities (according to chronicle terminology, земли, "lands"). The principalities differed both in the size of their territory and the degree of cohesion, and in the balance of power between the prince, the boyars, the emerging service nobility, and the ordinary population.

Nine principalities were ruled by their own dynasties. Their structure reproduced in miniature the system that previously existed on the scale of all Rus': local thrones were distributed among the members of the dynasty according to the rota system, the main throne went to the eldest in the clan. Princes did not strive to occupy thrones in "foreign" dynastic lands, and the external borders of this group of principalities were notable for their stability.

At the end of the 11th century, the Przemysl and Terebovlia volosts were secured for the sons of Yaroslav the Wise's eldest grandson Rostislav Vladimirovich, later merging into the Principality of Halych (which reached its peak during the reign of Yaroslav Osmomysl). In the Principality of Chernigov from 1127, the sons of Davyd and Oleg Svyatoslavich ruled (subsequently only the Olgovichi). In the Principality of Murom, which separated from it, their uncle Yaroslav Sviatoslavich ruled. Later, the Principality of Ryazan separated from the Principality of Murom. In the Suzdal land, the descendants of Vladimir Monomakh's son Yuri Dolgorukiy established themselves; the capital of the principality from 1157 was Vladimir. The Principality of Smolensk from the 1120s was secured for the line of Vladimir Monomakh's grandson Rostislav Mstislavich. In the Principality of Volhynia, the descendants of another grandson of Monomakh, Izyaslav Mstislavich, began to rule. In the second half of the 12th century, the Principality of Turov and Pinsk was secured for the descendants of Prince Sviatopolk Izyaslavich. From the second third of the 12th century, the Principality of Grodno was secured for the descendants of Vsevolodko (his patronymic is not given in the chronicles, presumably he was the grandson of Yaropolk Izyaslavich). The enclaved Principality of Tmutarakan and the city of Belaya Vezha ceased to exist at the beginning of the 12th century, falling to attacks by the Cumans.

Four principalities were not secured by any single dynasty. The Principality of Pereyaslavl did not become a patrimony, and was mostly ruled during the 12th and 13th centuries by junior representatives of the Vladimir-Suzdal Monomakhovichi, but periodically also by princes coming from other lands.

In the second half of the 12th century, the struggle for Kiev itself was mainly between the Monomakhovichi and the Olgovichi. At the same time, the area around Kiev — the so-called "Rus' land" in the narrow sense of the word — continued to be considered the common domain of the entire princely clan, and thrones in it could be occupied by representatives of several dynasties at once. For example, in 1181–1194, Kiev was in the hands of Sviatoslav Vsevolodovich of Chernigov, and the rest of the principality was ruled by Rurik Rostislavich of Smolensk.

Novgorod also remained an all-Russian throne. An extremely strong boyar class developed here, which did not allow a single princely branch to consolidate in the city. In 1136, the Monomakhovich Vsevolod Mstislavich was expelled, and power passed to the veche. Novgorod became an aristocratic republic. The boyars themselves invited princes. Their role was limited to performing some executive and judicial functions (together with the posadnik), and strengthening the Novgorod militia with princely druzhinniki. A similar order was established in Pskov, which by the middle of the 13th century became autonomous from Novgorod (finally from 1348).

After the extinction of the dynasty of the Halych Rostislavichi (1199), Halych temporarily found itself among the "unclaimed" thrones. It was seized by Roman Mstislavich of Volhynia, and as a result of the unification of the two neighboring lands, the Principality of Galicia-Volhynia emerged. However, after Roman's death (1205), the Galician boyars refused to recognize the authority of his young children, and a struggle for the Galician land unfolded among all the main princely branches, from which Roman's son Daniel emerged victorious.

In general, the political development of Rus' during this period was determined by the rivalry of the four strongest lands: Suzdal, Volhynian, Smolensk and Chernigov, ruled, respectively, by the sub-dynasties of the Yurievichi, Izyaslavichi, Rostislavichi and Olgovichi. The remaining lands depended on them in one form or another.

== Decline of Kiev ==
The Kievan land, which had turned from a metropole into a "simple" principality, was characterized by a steady decrease in its political role. The territory of the land itself, remaining under the control of the Kievan prince, also constantly decreased. One of the economic factors that undermined the power of the city was a change in international trade communications. The "Trade route from the Varangians to the Greeks", which was the core of Kievan Rus', lost its relevance after the Crusades. Europe and the East were now connected bypassing Kiev (via the Mediterranean Sea and via the Volga trade route). Constant struggle for the princely throne, political instability, and uprisings of citizens led to the fact that during the 12th century the Prince of Kiev changed 37 times; some of the princes occupied the throne for less than a year. Thus, Igor Olgovich and Gleb Yurievich were killed by Kievans less than a year into their reign, while Izyaslav Davydovich and Rostislav Mstislavich both occupied the throne three times and were overthrown twice. In 1169, as a result of the campaign of a coalition of eleven princes acting on the initiative of the Vladimir-Suzdal prince Andrey Bogolyubsky, Kiev, for the first time in the practice of princely feuds, was taken by storm and plundered, and for the first time the prince who seized the city did not stay to reign in it, placing his protégé to reign. Andrey was recognized as the eldest, bore the title of grand prince, but made no attempts to sit in Kiev. Thereby the traditional connection between the Kievan reign and the recognition of seniority in the princely clan became optional. In 1203, Kiev suffered a second sack, this time at the hands of Rurik Rostislavich of Smolensk, who had previously become the Prince of Kiev three times.

In the summer of 1212, Kiev was occupied by the troops of the Monomakhovichi coalition, after which the struggle around it subsided for two decades. The main leaders of the campaign were Mstislav Romanovich the Old of Smolensk, Mstislav Mstislavich the Bold of Novgorod, and Ingvar Yaroslavich of Lutsk.

A terrible blow was dealt to Kiev during the Mongol invasion in 1240. At this point, the city was already governed only by a princely viceroy; in the period since the beginning of the invasion, 5 princes had changed in it. According to the testimony of Plano Carpini, who visited the city six years later, the capital of Rus' had turned into a town with no more than 200 houses. There is an opinion that a significant part of the population of the Kievan region left for the northern regions. In the second half of the 13th century, Kiev was ruled by Vladimir viceroys, and later by Horde baskaks and local provincial princes, the names of most of whom are unknown. In 1299, Kiev lost its last metropolitan attribute — the residence of the metropolitan. In 1321, in the Battle on the Irpen River, the Kievan prince Stanislav, a descendant of the Olgovichi, suffered a defeat from the Lithuanians and recognized himself as a vassal of the Lithuanian prince Gediminas, while simultaneously remaining dependent on the Horde. In 1362, the city was finally annexed to Lithuania by Prince Algirdas.

During the reign of the appanage Lithuanian prince Vladimir Olgerdovich (no later than 1367–1395), the decline of Kiev was replaced by an upsurge. Urban construction resumed in the principality, and the minting of its own coin began. The territory of the principality expanded significantly. The Chernigov and Putivl volosts, as well as the Pereyaslavl land, were included in its composition. Vladimir's daughter was married to the son of the Tver Grand Prince Mikhail Alexandrovich. Potentially, Kiev had a chance to become another unifying center of the Russian lands, but the Grand Prince Vytautas removed Vladimir from the throne and in 1399 reduced the principality to the status of a viceroyalty. From 1440 to 1470, the Principality of Kiev was restored under the rule of Olelko Vladimirovich and Semyon Olelkovich, after which it was liquidated and transformed into a voivodeship.

== Factors of unity ==
Despite political disintegration, the idea of the unity of the Rus' land was preserved. The most important unifying factors that testified to the community of Russian lands and at the same time distinguished Rus' from other Orthodox countries were:

- Kiev and the title of the Kievan prince as the senior. The city of Kiev even after 1169 formally remained the capital, that is, the oldest throne of Rus'. The frequently encountered opinion about the transfer in this year of the capital of Rus' from Kiev to Vladimir or the division of Rus' into two parts — "Kievan" and "Vladimir", is a widespread inaccuracy. Kiev was called the "senior city" and the "mother of cities". It was perceived as the sacred center of the Orthodox land. It is to the Kievan rulers (regardless of their dynastic affiliation and real influence) that the title of "princes of all Rus'" is used in pre-Mongol sources. As for the title of "grand prince", in the same period it was applied to both Kievan and Vladimir princes. And in relation to the latter more consistently. However, in the South Russian chronicles, its use was necessarily accompanied by the restrictive clarification grand prince "of Suzdal".
- Princely clan. Before the western Russian lands became part of Lithuania, absolutely all local thrones were occupied only by the descendants of Rurik. Rus' was in the collective ownership of the clan. Active princes constantly moved from throne to throne during their lives. A visible echo of the tradition of clan-wide ownership was the belief that the defense of the "Rus' land" (in the narrow sense), that is, the Principality of Kiev, was an all-Russian matter. Princes of almost all Russian lands took part in large campaigns against the Cumans in 1183 and the Mongols in 1223.
- Church. The entire Old Russian territory formed a single metropolis, ruled by the Kievan metropolitan. From the 1160s he began to bear the title "of all Rus'". Cases of violation of church unity under the influence of political struggle periodically arose, but were short-lived. These include the establishment of a titular metropolis in Chernigov and Pereyaslavl during the triumvirate of Yaroslavichi of the 11th century, Andrey Bogolyubsky's project to create a separate metropolis for the Vladimir-Suzdal land, the existence of the Metropolis of Halych (1303–1391 with interruptions) and the Metropolis of Lithuania (around 1317–1419 with interruptions) metropolises. In 1299, the residence of the metropolitan was moved from Kiev to Vladimir, and from 1325 — to Moscow. The final division of the metropolis into the Moscow Diocese and Kievan occurred only in the 15th century.
- Single historical memory. The countdown of history in all Russian chronicles always began with the Primary Chronicle of the Kievan cycle and the activities of the first Kievan princes.
- Awareness of ethnic community. The question of the existence of a single Old Russian nationality in the era of the formation of Kievan Rus' is debatable. However, the folding of such by the period of fragmentation does not raise serious doubts. Tribal identification among the Eastern Slavs gave way to territorial. The inhabitants of all principalities called themselves Russians (in the singular, Rusyn), and their language Russian. A vivid embodiment of the idea of "Greater Rus'" from the Arctic Ocean to the Carpathians are the "Tale of the Destruction of the Rus' Land", written in the first years after the invasion, and the "List of Russian Cities, Far and Near" (late 14th century).

== Consequences of disintegration ==
Being a natural phenomenon, fragmentation at first contributed to the dynamic economic development of the Russian lands: the growth of cities, the flourishing of culture. The total territory of Rus' increased due to intensive colonization. On the other hand, fragmentation led to a decrease in defensive potential, which coincided with an unfavorable foreign policy situation. By the beginning of the 13th century, in addition to the Cuman danger (which was decreasing, since after 1185 the Cumans did not undertake invasions of Rus' outside the framework of Russian princely feuds), Rus' faced aggression from two other directions. Enemies appeared in the north-west: Catholic German orders and Lithuanian tribes entering the stage of decomposition of the tribal system threatened Polotsk, Pskov, Novgorod and Smolensk. Hungary sometimes interfered in the internal affairs of Halych. In 1237–1240, the Mongol-Tatar invasion from the southeast took place, after which the Russian lands fell under the rule of the Golden Horde.

== Tendencies toward unification ==
At the beginning of the 13th century, the total number of principalities (including appanage ones) reached 50. At the same time, several potential centers of unification were maturing. The most powerful Russian principalities in the northeast were Vladimir-Suzdal and Smolensk. By the beginning of the 13th century, the nominal supremacy of the Vladimir Grand Prince Vsevolod Yuryevich the Big Nest was recognized by all Russian lands, except Chernigov and Polotsk, and he acted as an arbiter in the dispute of the southern princes for Kiev. In the first third of the 13th century, the leading position was occupied by the house of the Smolensk Rostislavichi, who, unlike other princes, did not divide their principality into appanages, but sought to occupy thrones beyond its borders. With the arrival in Halych of the representative of the Monomakhovichi Roman Mstislavich, the Principality of Galicia-Volhynia became the most powerful principality in the south-west. In the latter case, a multiethnic center was formed, open for contacts with Central Europe.

However, the natural course of centralization was crossed out by the Mongol invasion. In the second half of the 13th century, ties between the Russian lands, ranging from political contacts to mentioning each other in the chronicles, reached a minimum. Most of the previously existing principalities underwent strong territorial fragmentation. The further gathering of Russian lands took place in difficult foreign policy conditions and was dictated primarily by political prerequisites. The principalities of North-Eastern Rus' during the 14th–15th centuries united around Moscow. The southern and western Russian lands became an integral part of the Grand Duchy of Lithuania.

== See also ==
- Gathering of the Russian lands
- Feudal fragmentation

== Sources ==
- Gorsky, A. A. (1996). Русские земли в XIII—XIV веках: Пути политического развития [Russian lands in the 13th–14th centuries: Paths of political development] (in Russian). Moscow.
- Gorsky, A. A. (2004). Русь от славянского Расселения до Московского царства [Rus' from the Slavic Settlement to the Tsardom of Muscovy] (in Russian). Moscow.
- Gorsky, A. A. (2007). "Князь «всея Руси» до XIV века" [Prince "of all Rus'" before the 14th century]. Восточная Европа в древности и средневековье: политические институты и верховная власть (in Russian). Moscow.
- Nazarenko, A. V. (2007). "Древняя Русь" [Ancient Rus']. Православная энциклопедия (in Russian). Vol. 16.
- Nazarenko, A. V. (2009a). "Древнерусское политическое старейшинство по «ряду» Ярослава Мудрого и его типологические параллели — реальные и мнимые" [Old Russian political seniority according to the "row" of Yaroslav the Wise and its typological parallels - real and imaginary]. Древняя Русь и славяне [Ancient Rus' and the Slavs] (in Russian). Moscow.
- Nazarenko, A. V. (2009b). "Была ли столица в Древней Руси? Некоторые сравнительно-исторические и терминологические наблюдения" [Was there a capital in Ancient Rus'? Some comparative historical and terminological observations]. Древняя Русь и славяне [Ancient Rus' and the Slavs] (in Russian). Moscow.
- Nazarenko, A. V. (2000). "Городенское княжество и городенские князья в XII в." [The Principality of Grodno and the Grodno Princes in the 12th Century]. Древнейшие государства Восточной Европы. 1998 г. (in Russian). Moscow: Восточная литература РАН. Archived from the original on 2012-03-11.
- Tolochko, A. P. (2005). История Российская Василия Татищева. Источники и известия [Vasily Tatishchev's Russian History. Sources and news] (in Russian). Moscow - Kyiv.
