= Kievan succession crisis =

Kievan succession crisis, Kievan war of succession or internecine war in (Kievan) Rus' (Ukrainian: Міжусобна війна на Русі; Russian: Междоусобная война на Руси) may refer to:

- Feud of the Sviatoslavichi (c. 970s–980), after the death of Sviatoslav I Igorevich
- Kievan succession crisis of 1015–1019 (or Feud of the Volodimerovichi), after the death of Volodimer I Sviatoslavich "the Great"
  - Bolesław I's intervention in the Kievan succession crisis (1018), duke Bolesław I the Brave of Poland supported Sviatopolk's claim against Yaroslav
- 1139–1142 Kievan succession crisis, after the death of Yaropolk II Volodimerovich
- 1146–1159 Kievan succession crisis, after the death of Vsevolod II Olgovich
- 1167–1169 Kievan succession crisis, after the death of Rostislav I Mstislavich
- 1171–1173 Kievan succession crisis, after the death of Gleb of Kiev

== See also ==
- List of wars involving Kievan Rus'
- 1093–1097 Chernigov war of succession
- 1132–1134 Pereyaslavl succession crisis
- 1174–1177 Suzdalian war of succession
- Battle of Lipitsa, decisive engagement of the 1212–1216 Vladimir-Suzdal war of succession
