= Pskov Land =

Historical region in Russia

The Pskov Land (

Russian: Псковская земля, romanized: Pskovskaya zemlya) was a historical region in the north-west of medieval Russia centred around the city of Pskov. It was initially dependent on the Novgorod Republic; however, it developed its own republican form of government and formally won its independence in 1348 as the Pskov Republic, before ultimately being annexed by the Grand Principality of Moscow. It had an important role in the trade and conflicts between Russia and its western neighbours.

== Geography ==
Pskov is situated on the southern shore of the Lake Peipus, to the east of Livonia, and to the west of Novgorod. In the 13th century, the Principality of Pskov was a narrow strip of land along the eastern Narva River and Peipus, bordered to the south by the Velikaya River basin. The division between Livonia and Pskov was made up by an area of water bodies and poorly settled areas.

== History ==
=== Early history ===
Pskov was first mentioned in 903 when Olga, the wife of Igor of Kiev, was born there. In 1065–67, Vseslav attacked Pskov and Novgorod, then was captured by Iziaslav I of Kiev and his two brothers and imprisoned in Kiev.

=== 13th century ===
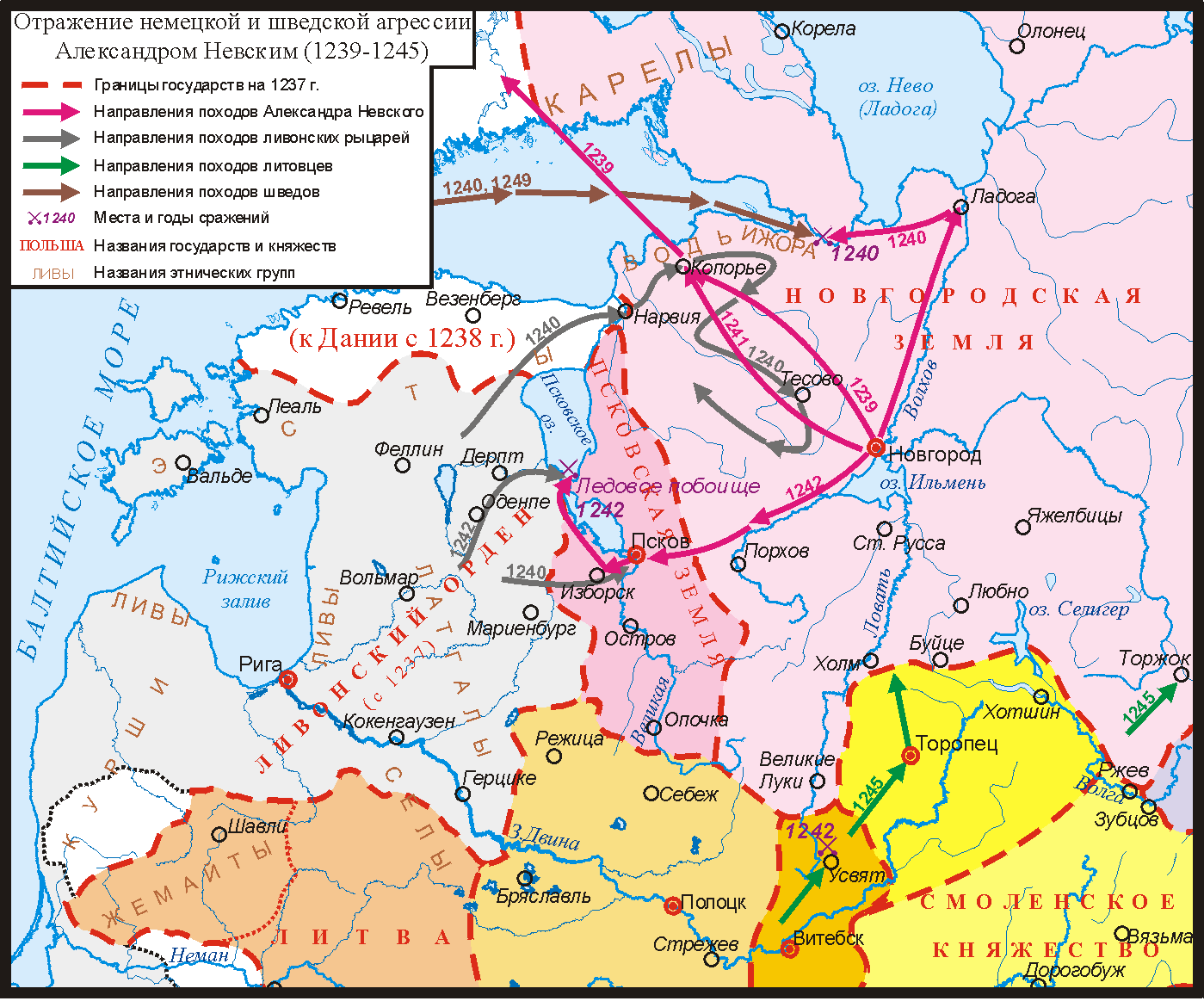
Military operations of Alexander Nevsky (1239–42), Pskov seen in dark pink (1237 borders). (in Russian)

In 1218, the princes of Novgorod and Pskov attacked Estonia and Latvia, while the Lithuanians had attacked Pskov in the meantime. A conflict ensued in the following years between Pskov and Letgallia. Pskov invaded Livonia in 1221.

The Novgorod Chronicle mentions the campaign Yaroslav Vsevolodovich of Novgorod in 1228; Yaroslav led his army against Pskov, upon which the inhabitants sealed the city and refused to let Yaroslav in. There were rumours that Yaroslav now wanted to imprison Pskov's most notable men, but Yaroslav declared that he had good intentions, wanting to deliver gifts, and now assembled an army and to attack Riga. Now, Pskov entered a military alliance with Riga. The Novgorod nobility believed that Yaroslav had merely used the pretext of attacking Riga to conquer Pskov. Yaroslav now asked Pskov to take part in the attack, but Pskov refused.

Between 1236 and 1242, the entirety of Kievan Rus', except Novgorod, Pskov, Smolensk and Polotsk, was conquered by the Golden Horde. The Teutonic Knights captured a fort southwest of Pskov, then occupied the city in 1240 and established rule to the west of Novgorod. After appeals from Novgorod, Grand Prince Yaroslav sent two brothers, Alexander and Andrey, who expelled the knights and halted their eastern advance.

=== 14th century ===
In 1316, Pskov troops took part in a Novgorod campaign against Tver.

In the 1320s, the coalitions of the Teutonic knights and Novgorod, on one side, and of Lithuania, Pskov and their Livonian allies, on the other side, faced each other in the region. In 1322–23 Pskov campaigned as a Lithuanian ally, probably first in the Lithuanian attack on Dorpat (March 1322), then in the Grodno raid into Danish Estonia (1323). In response, in May 1323, knight Kesselhuth launched an 18-day siege of Pskov, while Pskov's request to Novgorod and Yuri Danilovich for aid were refused. The siege was ended after an army dispatch from Lithuania, after which peace was agreed.

Alexander of Tver was forced to flee after a joint Muscovite–Tatar invasion in 1327, and found refuge in Pskov. He was excommunicated by the city metropolitan, but returned in 1331, ruling the city until 1337.

== List of princes (until 1348) ==
Prince	Service	Notes
Sudislav	1014–36	Son of Vladimir the Great (Rurikids)
unknown
Vsevolod Mstislavich	1137–38	Son of Mstislav I (Rurikids)
Svyatopolk Mstislavich	1138–48	Son of Mstislav I (Rurikids)
unknown
Mstislav Romanovich	1179–95	Son of Roman I, Rostislavichi of Smolensk
unknown
Vladimir Mstislavich of Pskov	1208–1212; 1215–mid-1220s	son of Mstislav Rostislavich, Rostislavichi of Smolensk
vacant	c. 1227–1232	claimed by Yaroslav Vladimirovich
Yuri Mstislavich	1232–1240	
Yaroslav Vladimirovich	1240–1242	Vogt of the Livonian Order
Yaroslav Yaroslavich of Tver	1253–56	first Prince of Tver; son of Yaroslav II of Vladimir.
Svyatoslav Yaroslavich	1256–66	son of Yaroslav of Tver
Daumantas	1266–99	
David	1299	
Feodor Mikhailovich	1307	(Rurikids)
David	1323	
Seloga	1327–31	
Aleksandr Mikhailovich	1331–37	Yaroslavichi of Tver
Vsevolod	1341	Yaroslavichi of Tver
Andrei of Polotsk	1342–1349	Gediminids

== Bibliography ==
=== Primary sources ===
- Pskov Chronicles (13th–17th century).
  - Savignac, David (2016). The Pskov 3rd Chronicle. 2nd Edition. Edited, translated, and annotated by David Savignac. Crofton: Beowulf & Sons. p. 245.. Translation based on the 2000 reprint of Nasonov's 1955 critical edition.

=== Literature ===
- "Псковское княжество" . Brockhaus and Efron Encyclopedic Dictionary (in Russian). 1906.
- Gorsky, Anton A. (2016). Русские земли в XIII-XIV веках: пути политического развития [The Russian lands in the 13th–14th centuries: paths of political development] (in Russian). Наука. ISBN 978-5-02-039659-3.
- Jones, Michael (1995). The New Cambridge Medieval History: Volume 6, C.1300-c.1415. Cambridge University Press. pp. 765–. ISBN 978-0-521-36290-0.
- Martin, Janet (2007). Medieval Russia, 980-1584. Cambridge University Press. ISBN 978-0-521-85916-5.
- Selart, Anti (2015). Livonia, Rus' and the Baltic Crusades in the Thirteenth Century. BRILL. ISBN 978-90-04-28475-3.
