= Sack of Kiev (1169) =

1169 siege

- Part of the 1167–1169 Kievan succession crisis
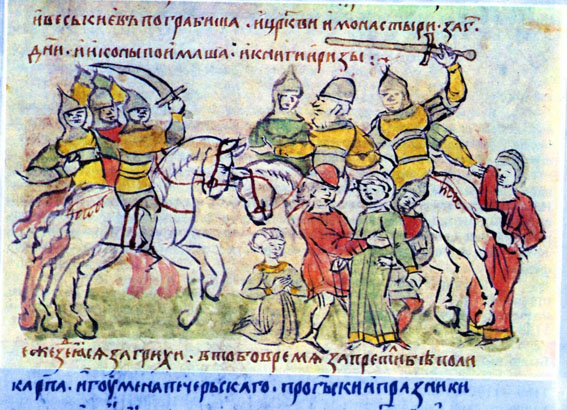
- Pillaging of Kiev in 1169, miniature from the 15th-century Radziwiłł Chronicle
Date	8–12 March 1169
Location	Kiev, Kievan Rus'
Result	Coalition victory

Belligerents
Iziaslavichi of Volhynia: Principality of Kiev; Principality of Volhynia; Novgorod Republic; Principality of Halych	Coalition: Yurievichi of Suzdalia; Olgovichi of Chernigov; Rostislavichi of Smolensk

Commanders and leaders
Mstislav II of Kiev	Andrey Bogolyubsky; Sviatoslav of Chernigov; Roman of Smolensk

The sack of Kiev took place on 8–12 March 1169 when a coalition of 11 princes, assembled by prince Andrey Bogolyubsky of Vladimir-Suzdal, attacked the Kievan Rus' capital city of Kiev (modern Kyiv) during the 1167–1169 Kievan succession crisis. The conflict, caused by the death of grand prince Rostislav I of Kiev, was between rival branches of the Monomakhovichi clan: the Iziaslavichi of Volhynia (senior Mstislavichi; in control of Kiev, Novgorod, Volynia and Halych) on the one hand, and the Rostislavichi of Smolensk (junior Mstislavichi), the Yurievichi (controlling Suzdalia and Pereyaslavl), and the Olgovichi of Chernigov on the other. Prince Mstislav II of Kiev sought to defend Kiev against the Rostislavichi–Yurievichi–Olgovichi coalition.

== Background ==
It is unclear how succession in Kievan Rus' worked. According to a widely-held view, the traditional rules of hereditary succession dictated that one could only become grand prince of Kiev if one's father or elder brother had sat on the same throne before oneself, although the precise order is not apparent. If one's father or elder brother(s) died before 'sitting on the throne of Kiev', this would make one izgoi, ineligible to reign. A number of scholars have asserted that there was a clear set of rules known as the rota system; the nature and existence of this rota system has been widely debated, with some claiming that no such formal system of succession existed in Kievan Rus'.

=== 1132–1134 Pereyaslavl succession crisis ===
After the 1132 death of the prince Mstislav I of Kiev, son of Vladimir Monomakh, his brother Yaropolk II of Kiev ascended to the throne without incident in accordance with established succession practices, and was recognised by the whole Monomakhovichi family. But a conflict arose amongst the Monomakhovichi over the possession of the Principality of Pereyaslavl, the holder of which was expected to be the successor to the Kievan throne. When Yaropolk tried to install his nephew Vsevolod Mstislavich of Novgorod and Pskov as the new prince of Pereyaslavl, his younger brother Yuri Dolgorukiy of Rostov-Suzdal challenged him, and war broke out. The conflict, which ended in a compromise in 1134, permanently divided the Monomakhovichi clan into two branches: the senior branch of Mstislav (in 1138 splitting into the Izyaslavichi of Volhynia and the Rostislavichi of Smolensk) and the junior branch of the Yurievichi of Rostov-Suzdal (later Vladimir-Suzdal).

=== 1139–1142 Kievan succession crisis ===
When Yaropolk II died in 1139, he was succeeded by his brother Viacheslav I of Kiev, but not for long: within two weeks, the Olgovichi prince Vsevolod of Chernigov seized the Kievan throne by force of arms, reigning without dynastic legitimacy (since his father had never been grand prince of Kiev) until his death in 1146. The Mstislavichi (Izyaslavichi) refused to accept this state of affairs, and defeated both the Olgovichi and Yurievichi by 1142, with Iziaslav II Mstislavich gaining control over Pereyaslavl (and thus the right to reign in Kiev upon Vsevolod's death in 1146) and his brother Sviatopolk of Pskov gaining control over Novgorod.

=== 1146–1159 Kievan succession crisis ===
When Vsevolod II Olgovich of Kiev died in 1146, his brother Igor Olgovich immediately claimed the throne, but the Kievan veche refused to accept him. They supported the Pereyaslavl prince Iziaslav II Mstislavich as the new Grand Prince, who thereafter managed to put his own son Mstislav on the throne of Pereyaslavl, and other Mstislavichi relatives in Volhynia, Smolensk, Turov and Novgorod within a few years. Iziaslav's legitimacy was based on some but not all traditional succession criteria of the rota system. According to the view that Yaroslav the Wise had intended to limit succession to the Kievan to three princes per generation, Iziaslav's accession was legitimate; but the Olgovichi line of 'Vsevolod's brothers and cousins represented the elder generation of the dynasty'. If the Olgovichi of Chernigov accepted Iziaslav's accession, they and their descendants would be excluded from all future Kievan successions, and so they vehemently objected. Uncle Yuri Dolgorukiy (progenitor of the Yurievichi of Suzdalia) also fiercely protested that his claim to Kiev preceded that of his nephew Iziaslav II, and even managed to temporarily drive him out of the capital twice.

Yuri's primary goal was controlling Pereyaslavl to secure the Kievan throne for his descendants. In 1147, a joint Yurievichi–Olgovichi force with Cuman aid commanded by Yuri's son Gleb attacked Pereyaslavl, but Iziaslav and his brother Rostislav of Smolensk came to his son Mstislav's assistance, and successfully defended the crown-princely city. Iziaslav made peace with the Olgovichi of Chernigov, but rejected Yuri's peace proposal in which Yuri would recognise Iziaslav as Grand Prince of Kiev in return for transferring Pereyaslavl Iziaslav's son Mstislav to Yuri's son Gleb.

Yuri also tried to disrupt the Volga trade between Volga Bulgaria and the Iziaslav-allied Novgorod Republic; in response, a 1148 Novgorodian punitive expedition (supported by the Mstislavichi-controlled principalities of Kiev and Smolensk) attacked the Suzdalian town of Yaroslavl on the Volga. In 1149, Novgorod also defeated a Suzdalian band trying to prevent the Republic from collecting tribute in its northern regions. The Mstislavichi continued to reign in Novgorod until 1155, with Yuri keeping up pressure on its vulnerable commercial routes. Meanwhile, Yuri and Gleb attacked Kiev successfully in 1149, driving out Iziaslav, but they soon withdrew, and were unable to conquer the crown principality during the protracted battle for Pereyaslavl. In 1151, Yuri's second attempt to seize the capital utterly failed, and he lost both the Kiev and Pereyaslavl. Iziaslav II and his uncle Viacheslav Vladimirovich co-reigned in Kiev until their deaths in 1154. First, the Olgovichi prince Izyaslav Davydovych of Chernigov briefly seized Kiev in 1154. Only after expelling him did Yuri gain hold of Kiev until he himself died in 1157, putting Gleb in Pereyaslavl, another son in Novgorod in 1155, and other Yurievichi relatives in Turov and their family domain of Suzdalia.

After Yuri's death in 1157, local boyars invited Izyaslav Davydovych back to the Grand Princely throne in Kiev. However, his father Davyd Sviatoslavich had never sat on the throne of Kiev, making him izgoi, and he was unable to extend his authority in other Kievan Rus' principalities. The Yurievichi remained in control of Pereyaslavl (Gleb) and Suzdalia (Andrey Bogolyubsky), while Novgorod elected Rostislav of Smolensk's son – a Mstislavichi prince – in 1157. In the next year, 1158, the fully eligible Rostislav easily took the Kievan throne, supported by both the princes of Volhynia and Halych; he reigned until 1167.

=== 1159–1167 interlude ===
With the accession of Rostislav of Smolensk as Grand Prince of Kiev, 'the traditional principles of dynastic succession were restored and the feuds between dynastic branches relaxed.' The Mstislavichi and Yurievichi branches of the Monomakhovichi clan jointly dominated Kievan Rus', and cooperated to ensure dynastic stability throughout the reign of Rostislav. The senior Mstislavichi line controlled capital Kiev, Smolensk, Volynia, and Novgorod, while the junior Yurievichi branch reigned in Suzdalia and the crown principality of Pereyaslavl. According to Petro Tolochko, Rostislav's nephew Mstislav Iziaslavich was essentially his co-ruler.

=== 1167–1169 Kievan succession crisis ===
Kievan Rus' principalities (map showing the situation of 1132) in the 1167–9 succession crisis: Iziaslavichi Kiev – Iziaslavichi Novgorod – Iziaslavichi Volynia – Iziaslavichi Halych – Rostislavichi of Tmutarakan Coalition Pereyaslavl – Yurievichi Suzdalia – Yurievichi Smolensk – Rostislavichi of Smolensk Chernigov – Olgovichi Neutral Murom-Ryazan – Sviatoslavichi (Olgovichi branch) Polotsk – Vseslavichi (disputed territory)

After the death of Rostislav in 1167, the princely quarrels resumed. According to his position of family seniority, Volodimer Mstislavich was next in line for the Kievan throne. Nevertheless, the Kievan boyars invited Mstislav Iziaslavich, the prince of Volhynia (Volyn), to reign the grand principality. Therefore, having enlisted the support of Yaroslav Halytsky and mobilized a small squad, Mstislav Iziaslavich easily took over the city. However, by taking the throne, he breached the balance of power agreement between the Mstislavichi and Yurievichi, as well as causing a conflict between the Iziaslavichi of Volhynia (the senior Mstislavichi line) and the Rostislavichi of Smolensk (the junior Mstislavichi line). This divided the dynasty into two opposing camps:

- The Iziaslavichi of Volhynia (senior Mstislavichi; controlling Kiev, Volynia, Halych, and Novgorod); led by Mstislav II Iziaslavich of Volhynia and Kiev.
- The Rostislavichi of Smolensk (junior Mstislavichi), the Yurievichi (controlling Suzdalia and Pereyaslavl), and the Olgovichi of Chernigov; led by Andrey Bogolyubsky of Vladimir-Suzdal and Rostov.

In 1168 grand prince Mstislav Iziaslavich of Kiev headed an anti-Polovtsian expedition, in which as many as thirteen princes took part.

In 1169, Andrey Bogolyubsky gathered a large army, which included Murom, Smolensk, Polotsk, Chernihiv, and Dorogobuzh princes, and marched on Kiev. The onslaught was not successful, but Mstyslav's forces were small, as he sent the troops to help his son in Novgorod just before the attack. On the advice of his wife, who was in Kiev, the Grand Prince fled the city and went to Volyn to gather some help.

== The sack ==
The two main primary sources about the 1169 Sack of Kiev are the Kievan Chronicle (found in the Hypatian Codex) and the Suzdalian Chronicle (found in the Laurentian Codex). The two accounts agree on the following factual descriptions: a military campaign was undertaken at the order of Andrey Bogolyubsky against the city of Kiev and Mstislav Iziaslavich, whom both apparently recognised as the (lawful?) "Kievan Prince". Both agree that the coalition forces were commanded by Andrey's son Mstislav Andreyevich, that 11 other princes participated in the assault (mentioning some by name), provide similar accounts of some aspects of the battle and how Kiev was taken, how Mstislav Iziaslavich's wife and son were captured, the city was sacked and plundered – specifically the churches and monasteries, where many icons, books chasubles were removed/looted from – and the installation of Gleb of Kiev as the next grand prince, after Mstislav Andreyevich returned to Vladimir on the Klyazma in the northeast.

Where they differ is in the details and in their Tendenz: the author of the Kievan Chronicle provides a very elaborate and detailed account, in which he identifies with the capital, the fate of Kiev's citizens and their suffering. He explains the sack of Kiev according to Christian tradition as a just punishment for unspecified sins the inhabitants had allegedly committed, and lamented it. The writer of the Suzdal'–Vladimirian Chronicle agrees that the city was sacked as a just punishment for its inhabitants' sins, but treats Kiev as an enemy, promoting the Yurievichi (Vladimir-Suzdalian) branch of the Monomakhovichi dynasty instead. While the Kievan account describes the attackers who set the Kyiv Monastery of the Caves on fire as "heathens", the Suzdal'–Vladimirian story calls the Monastery's metropolitan "unlawful" because of a theological disagreement over fasting on holy days, adding "that no one may oppose God's law".

After the long siege, the defenders of the city surrendered on 8 March 1169. Mstislav II Iziaslavich fled, while his wife and son were captured by coalition forces. The victorious coalition plundered the city of Kiev and looted its treasures for three days. Chroniclers who witnessed and recorded the events were shocked, with one chronicler lamenting that even icons, their costly metal mountings (rizas), and books from monasteries and churches were stolen.

After that, Andrey Bogolyubsky put his younger brother Gleb Yurievich, prince of Pereyaslav, on the throne of Kiev.

== Aftermath ==
=== Novgorod versus Suzdal and Mstislav's return ===
In 1170 Bogolyubsky sent troops to Novgorod. The formal reason was the dispute over the "Dvina tribute", which Novgorod received from Finno-Ugric tribes, and which from 1169 started to pay the Northern Dvina tribute to Suzdal. On 22 February 1170, a united army of Suzdal, Murom, Polotsk, Pereyaslav and others surrounded the city. However, Novgorod persevered. Then Andrey Bogolyubsky applied an economic blockade against Novgorod, and six months later the people of Novgorod asked for peace; they deposed Roman the Great from the Novgorodian throne in exchange for another Rostislavichi prince, and then, in 1171, Andrey’s son Yuri.

Meanwhile, Mstislav II took Galician troops to attack Volhynian prince Volodimer Andreyevich (who had participated in the sack of Kiev), besieging and conquering Dorohobuzh in the winter of 1169–1170. Mstislav reportedly 'conquered many other cities and burned them, [and] returned to his own land', while Gleb had promised to send help to Volodimer, but he never did, and Volodimer died on 28 January 1170. Volodimer's widow apparently briefly reigned as Princess of Dorohobuzh until Mstislav's uncle drove her out.

Mstislav, having gathered Berendei en Tork troops in early 1170, went to Trepol' (modern Trypillia) and then briefly recaptured Kiev. However, the Berendei and Tork troops rebelled against Mstislav, who was ill and also had to deal with resistance from Vyshgorod. Gleb had been in Pereyaslavl at the time of Kiev's recapture, where he asked for the Polovtsians' help, and soon they had crossed the Dnipro back to Kiev. Mstislav decided to abandon Kiev again, this time without much of a fight; he returned to Volhynia, where he died on 19 August 1170.

=== Gleb's death ===
Grand prince Gleb of Kiev died soon after as well, probably in the year 1171 (on 20 January according to the Kievan Chronicle), albeit under somewhat mysterious circumstances. Although the Kievan Chronicle includes a eulogy about Gleb having been "a pious prince" who "loved his fellow man" and apparently dying of natural causes, without any hostility towards his reign, it also records several columns later that 'Andrej began to accuse the Rostislaviči (..),: "Give me Grigorij Xotovič and Stepanec and Oleksa Svjatoslavič, because they killed my brother Gleb, and so they are enemies to all of us."' The Suzdalian Chronicle is rather quiet on the matter, simply noting that "In year 6680 [1172], the pious prince Gleb Yurievich of Kiev died, having reigned in Kiev for two years; they buried him at the Church of the Saviour at Berestove next to his father Yuri." There is no mention of Andrey accusing anyone of killing his brother Gleb. The Novgorod First Chronicle is even briefer, just saying "The same year Knyaz Gleb Gyurgevits died at Kiev, and they fetched in Volodimir Mstislavits." Whatever the cause, Gleb's death triggered another Kievan succession crisis. A rapid succession of briefly reigning princes in the capital eventually saw one Rurik Rostislavich seizing the crown.

=== Siege of Vyshgorod and Andrey's downfall ===
Trying to regain control of Kiev, Andrey Bogolyubsky sent another large coalition army (50,000 soldiers according to the Kievan Chronicle, but historians think this is exaggerated), combining the forces of 20 princes. The coalition besieged Siege of Vyshgorod in late 1173, but without success. On the night of 19 December 1173, near Vyshhorod, this army was completely defeated by a younger generation of Volynian–Smolensk princes under the command of Mstyslav Rostyslavych and the Lutsk prince Yaroslav Izyaslavych, who then became the Grand Prince of Kiev.

Andrey's attempts to increase his princely authority at the expense of the positions of boyars, bishops, city officials and the veche led to internal strife. As a result, on 28 June 1174, conspirators killed Andrey in his residential town of Bogolyubovo in Suzdalia. His death triggered the 1174–1177 Suzdalian war of succession; after several years of struggle, Andrey's brother Vsevolod the Big Nest ascended the throne of Vladimir-Suzdal. Meanwhile, Novgorod threw the Yurievichi out of the Republic after Andrey's assassination, and wouldn't be under their firm control again until 1187.

== Interpretations ==
How the 1169 Sack of Kiev is to be interpreted is a matter of scholarly and historiographical debate. 'Many historians perceive it as a turning point in the history of Kievan Rus', although it may have had less material meaning than it was of symbolic significance. Yet, no other event has been given more weight by scholars to argue that the entire Kievan Rus' state was in the process of falling apart. One frequently expressed interpretation regards the sack of Kiev as signalling the rise of Vladimir-Suzdal, as Andrey Bogolyubsky decided to keep Vladimir on the Klyazma as his residence, and appointed his younger brother Gleb (considered a "minor prince" by some) to govern the city of Kiev instead of taking the throne for himself. He did not even lead his troops into battle, appointing his son Yury Bogolyubsky as commander, while he stayed behind in Suzdalia focusing on construction projects. A common alternate interpretation sees Andrey recognising and confirming the centrality of Kiev, and restoring the dynastic order according to established practice by appointing Gleb as grand prince of Kiev because Gleb was already prince of Pereyaslavl, a traditional requirement for the Kievan throne. Ukrainian historian Mykhailo Hrushevsky (1905) described the event as: "A whole cloud of princes of the Rus' moved to destroy Kyiv to the glory of its northern rival."

Imperial Russian historian Vasily Klyuchevsky (died 1911) called the Suzdalian prince Andrei Bogolyubsky the first prince of the future Muscovites: "With Andrey Bogolyubsky, velikoros (the Great Russian) had entered the historical arena." The chronicles call the Galician-Volyn prince Roman Mstislavych "the autocrat of all Rus'", while Andrey Bogolyubsky is called "the autocrat of the whole Suzdal land".

Russo-American historian George Vernadsky (1948) wrote: 'It was characteristic of Andrei that he did not go to Kiev after the seizure of the city by his troops but had the Kievan throne occupied by minor princes whom he treated as his vassals.'

According to Soviet Russian historian B. A. Rybakov (1982), 'the description and degree of destruction in Kiev had been exaggerated by the chroniclers'.

Jaroslaw Pelenski (1987) deduced that the primary justification for the Sack of Kiev provided in the Suzdal'–Vladimirian Chronicle was based on an earlier theological dispute concerning fasting on holy days which took place in Suzdal' in 1164.

According to Lev Gumilev (1992), 'the Kiev pogrom testified to the loss of a sense of ethnic and state unity with Rus' among the population of Zalesye'. In 1169, after capturing Kiev, Andrey gave the city for three days of looting and plundering to his soldiers. It was accepted to treat cities this way only when dealing with foreign settlements – until now. Such a practice has never spread to Rus' cities under any circumstances by that time. Andrey Bogolyubsky's order shows,' from Lev Gumilev's point of view, 'that for him and his army' (that is, Suzdalian, Chernigovian and Smolensk soldiers) 'Kiev in 1169 was as foreign as any German or Polish castle.

Ukrainian historian Natalija Polonsjka-Vasylenko (1995) pointed out that, for one hundred years since the death of Vsevolod II 1146 in Kiev, there were: 47 reigns, 24 princes of 7 lines and 3 dynasties; of which one was in power 7 times, 5 of them – 3 times, 8 of them – twice. Depending on the duration of rule: one – 13 years, one – 6 years, two – 5 years, 4 – 4 years, 3 – 3 years, 7 – 2 years and 36 – 1 year.

American historian Janet Martin (2007) reasoned that Andrey was motivated by 'restoring the accepted dynastic order (...), not [by] a desire to tear that realm apart.' All princes had recognised Rostislav of Smolensk 'as the rightful heir. Andrei, therefore, had no reason to intervene in Kievan politics until 1167, when Rostislav's nephew violated the collateral pattern of succession.' Andrey chose Gleb as the new grand prince of Kiev simply because Gleb was already prince of Pereyaslavl, and thus next in line for the Kievan throne (after Rostislav's brother), confirming rather than disrupting established practice.

Iryna Kostenko and Maryna Ostapenko (2022) wrote that Andrey sought to made Vladimir in Suzdalia "a second Kiev" by stealing the Icon of the Blessed Mother of God from Vyshhorod in 1155 (which would later become the most revered shrine of the Russian Empire). But without controlling the capital, he could not become a grand prince; therefore, in 1169, Andrey tried to destroy Kiev instead. "But not for long. Because from the ruins and ashes, the capital city of Kyiv unexpectedly rose again," and two years later defeated Andrey in the Siege of Vyshhorod (1171).

== Overview of princely branches of Kiev ==
Princely branches of Kiev from Yaroslav the Wise until 1169

Volodimerovichi; Yaroslav the Wise
Sviatoslav II	Vsevolod I
Olgovichi of Chernigov; Oleg I of Chernigov	Davyd of Chernigov	Monomakhovichi; Vladimir II Monomakh
Vsevolod II	Igor II	Iziaslav III	Mstislavichi; Mstislav I	Yaropolk II	Viacheslav	Yurievichi of Suzdalia; Yuri Dolgorukiy
Sviatoslav III	Izyaslavichi of Volhynia; Iziaslav II	Rostislavichi of Smolensk; Rostislav I	Vladimir III	Andrey; Bogolyubsky	Gleb	Mikhail
Mstislav II

== Bibliography ==
=== Primary sources ===
- Kyivan Chronicle (c. 1200).
  - (Church Slavonic critical edition) Shakhmatov, Aleksey Aleksandrovich, ed. (1908). Ipat'evskaya letopis' Ипатьевская лѣтопись [The Hypatian Codex]. Complete Collection of Rus' Chronicles (PSRL) (in Church Slavic). Vol. 2 (3rd ed.). Saint Petersburg: Typography of M. A. Aleksandrov / Izbornyk. pp. 285–301.
  - (modern English translation) Heinrich, Lisa Lynn (1977). The Kievan Chronicle: A Translation and Commentary (PhD diss.). Nashville, Tennessee: Vanderbilt University. p. 616. ProQuest 7812419
  - (modern Ukrainian translation) Makhnovets, Leonid (1989). Літопис Руський за Іпатським списком [Rus' Chronicle according to the Hypatian Codex] (in Ukrainian). Kyiv: Dnipro. p. 591. ISBN 5-308-00052-2. — A modern annotated Ukrainian translation of the Kievan Chronicle based on the Hypatian Codex with comments from the Khlebnikov Codex.
- Suzdalian Chronicle (c. 1203), sub anno 6677 (1169)
  - (Church Slavonic critical edition) Лаврентьевская летопись 6677 [1169] — 6681 [1173] [Laurentian Chronicle 6677 [1169] — 6681 [1173]]. Полное Собрание Русских Литописей [Complete Collection of Rus' Chronicles]. Vol. 2: Суздальская летопись [The Suzdal Chronicle]. Leningrad: Academy of Science (USSR). 1927. pp. 355–365.

=== Literature ===
- Martin, Janet (2007). Medieval Russia: 980–1584. Second Edition. E-book. Cambridge: Cambridge University Press. ISBN 978-0-511-36800-4.
- Fennell, John (13 October 2014). The Crisis of Medieval Russia 1200-1304. Routledge. ISBN 978-1-317-87314-3.
- Ostrowski, Donald (2012). "Systems of Succession in Rus' and Steppe Societies". Ruthenica. XI: 39–43.
- Pelenski, Jaroslaw (1987). "The Sack of Kiev of 1169: Its Significance for the Succession to Kievan Rus'". Harvard Ukrainian Studies. 11 (3). Harvard Ukrainian Research Institute: 303–316. JSTOR 41036277. Reprinted in Pelenski (1998), The Contest for the Legacy of Kievan Rus'.
- Pelenski, Jaroslaw (1988). "The Contest for the "Kievan Succession" (1155–1175): The Religious-Ecclesiastical Dimension". Harvard Ukrainian Studies. 12/13: 761–780. JSTOR 41036344. Reprinted in Pelenski (1998), The Contest for the Legacy of Kievan Rus'.
