= Olgovichi =

12th and 13th-century family of Rurik dynasty

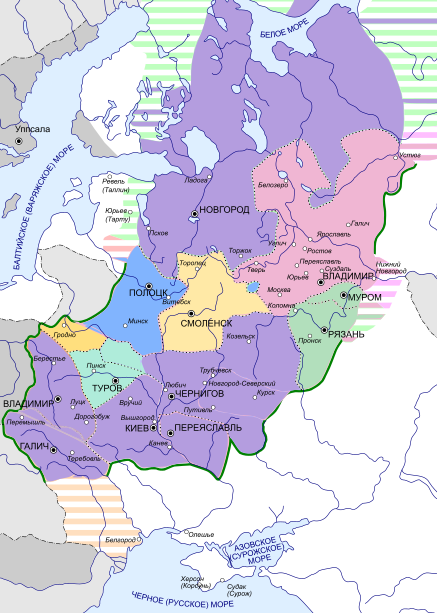
Rus' principalities controlled by the Olgovichi at various times

The Olgovichi or Olhovychi (Note: Old East Slavic: Ольговичи, romanized: Ol'govichi; Ukrainian: Ольговичі, romanized: Ol'hovychi; Russian: Ольговичи, romanized: Ol'govichi. Literally "sons/scions of Oleg / Oleh".) were one of the four dominant princely families of Kievan Rus' in the 12th and 13th century. (Note: In 12th- and 13th-century Kievan Rus', the four dominant princely clans were the Olgovichi of Chernigov, the Rostislavichi of Smolensk, the Iziaslavichi of Volhynia (based in modern Volodymyr in Volyn'), and the Yurievichi of Suzdalia (alias the Vsevolodichi of Vladimir on the Klyazma). 'Three of these clan founders – Vsevolod, Rostislav, and Iziaslav – were the grandsons of Volodimer Monomakh. The outlier from this set is Oleg, who was instead a cousin of Volodimer Monomakh.') First mentioned in the Hypatian continuation of the Primary Chronicle (PVL) under the year 1116 (Note: "Volodimer', trusting in God and in justice, went to Smolensk" [sic, should read "Minsk"] "with his army and with Davyd Sviatoslavich, and the Olgovichi.") and literally meaning "the sons of Oleg", they were named after Oleg I Sviatoslavich, Prince of Chernigov (r. 1094–1097) and Principality of Novgorod-Seversk (r. 1097–1115). He was the grandson of Yaroslav the Wise; ruling dynasty in the Chernigov principality, Novgorod-Seversky principality, as well as with interruptions: in the Kiev, Galicia, Volyn, Pereyaslav principalities, Novgorod lands.

== Overview ==
The Principality of Chernigov (modern Chernihiv in northern Ukraine) was the main Olgovichi patrimony (hence the term "Olgovichi of Chernigov"), with the Principality of Novgorod-Seversk (modern Novhorod-Siverskyi) serving as the primary appanage. From 1054 to 1186, the Principality of Murom–Ryazan was subordinate to the Olgovichi of Chernigov; then it sought an independent existence between Chernigov and Suzdalia until Vsevolod the Big Nest destroyed and depopulated Ryazan in 1208.

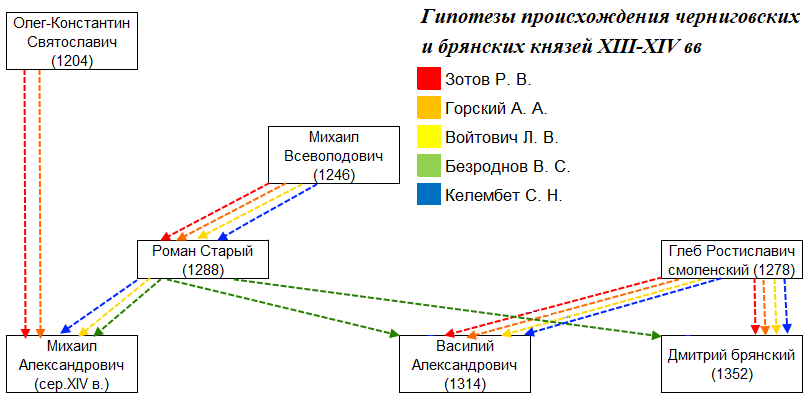
There are competing hypotheses on how the Olgovichi of Chernigov are related to the princes of Bryansk.

The Olgovichi frequently managed to put one of their clan members on the grand princely throne of Kiev (modern Kyiv), including Michael of Chernigov, who in the wake of the Mongol invasion was executed by Batu Khan in 1246 and later canonised as an Orthodox saint. There is some uncertainty regarding his descendants, who from the late 13th century appear to have expanded Olgovichi control to Bryansk, Kursk, and the Upper Oka Principalities (in the present-day Russian Federation). From 1301 to 1324, the Olgovichi reigned in Kiev again. In the 14th and 15th centuries, the Olgovichi principalities were gradually divided between the Grand Duchy of Lithuania (where the clan was incorporated into the Ruthenian nobility) and the Principality of Moscow.

The creator of The Tale of Igor's Campaign criticised the founder of this family, Oleg Svyatoslavich (Gorislavich), for excessive lust for power and undermining the integrity of the Rus' state. The Olgovichi cooperated with the Polovtsian khans the most among all princely clans and fought with them against the rest of the Rus' princes.

Slovenian–Canadian Slavistics researcher and priest Martin Dimnik (1941–2020) has published extensive studies on the Olgovichi.

Princely branches of Kiev from Yaroslav the Wise until 1169

Volodimerovichi; Yaroslav the Wise
Sviatoslav II	Vsevolod I
Olgovichi of Chernigov; Oleg I of Chernigov	Davyd of Chernigov	Monomakhovichi; Vladimir II Monomakh
Vsevolod II	Igor II	Iziaslav III	Mstislavichi; Mstislav I	Yaropolk II	Viacheslav	Yurievichi of Suzdalia; Yuri Dolgorukiy
Sviatoslav III	Izyaslavichi of Volhynia; Iziaslav II	Rostislavichi of Smolensk; Rostislav I	Vladimir III	Andrey; Bogolyubsky	Gleb	Mikhail
Mstislav II

== Bibliography ==
=== Primary sources ===
- Makhnovets, Leonid (1989). Літопис Руський за Іпатським списком [Rus' Chronicle according to the Hypatian Codex] (in Ukrainian). Kyiv: Dnipro. p. 591. ISBN 5-308-00052-2. — A modern annotated Ukrainian translation of the Primary Chronicle, Kievan Chronicle and Galician–Volhynian Chronicle, based on the Hypatian Codex with comments from the Khlebnikov Codex.
- Thuis, Hans (2015). Nestorkroniek. De oudste geschiedenis van het Kievse Rijk (in Dutch). Nijmegen: Uitgeverij Vantilt. p. 304. ISBN 9789460042287. – A modern Dutch translation of the Primary Chronicle, including the Hypatian continuation.

=== Literature ===
- Dimnik, Martin (1994). The Dynasty of Chernigov, 1054–1146. Pontifical Institute of Mediaeval Studies. ISBN 0-88844-116-9.
- Martin, Janet (2007). Medieval Russia: 980–1584. Second Edition. E-book. Cambridge: Cambridge University Press. ISBN 978-0-511-36800-4.
- Raffensperger, Christian; Ostrowski, Donald (2023). The Ruling Families of Rus: Clan, Family and Kingdom. London: Reaktion Books. p. 309. ISBN 978-1-78914-745-2. (e-book)
