= Roman I =

Roman I may refer to:

- Roman I of Kiev (died in 1180)
- Roman I of Moldavia (Voivode of Moldavia from 1391 to 1394)

== See also ==
- Romanos I (c. 870–948), Byzantine Emperor
