= Mstislav of Kiev =

Mstislav of Kiev may refer to:

- Mstislav I of Kiev (1076—1132)
- Mstislav II of Kiev (died 1172)
- Mstislav III of Kiev (died 1223)
