= Davyd Rostislavich =

David Rostislavich
- Prince of Smolensk
- Reign: 1180–1197
- Predecessor: Roman I of Kiev
- Successor: Mstislav III of Kiev

Prince of Smolensk
- Reign: 1180–1197
- Born: 1140; Smolensk
- Died: 23 April 1197 (aged 57); Smolensk
Names
- David Rostislavich
- Dynasty: Rostislavichi of Smolensk
- Father: Rostislav I of Kiev

David Rostislavich (Cyrillic: Давыд Ростиславич) (1140 - 23 April 1197), Prince of Smolensk (1180–1198) was fourth son of Rostislav Mstislavich, Velikiy Kniaz (Grand Prince) of Kiev.

== Biography ==
David was born in Smolensk in 1140, in the family of Rostislav Mstislavich, Prince of Smolensk. Since 1167, David ruled in Vyshhorod. In 1171, David attempted to put Vladimir III Mstislavich on the throne of the Kievan Rus', and in the following year, did the same for his brother Rurik Rostislavich. In 1175, together with Prince Oleg Svyatoslavich, he fought in Chernigov, and in 1176, David was defeated by Cumans in the battle near Rostovets, which is mentioned in The Tale of Igor's Campaign.

== Sources ==
- The Chronicle of Novgorod PDF file
