= Principality of Smolensk =

Russian principality (1125–1404)

Principality of Smolensk Смоленское княжество
- 1125–1404
- Coat of arms (c. 1430)

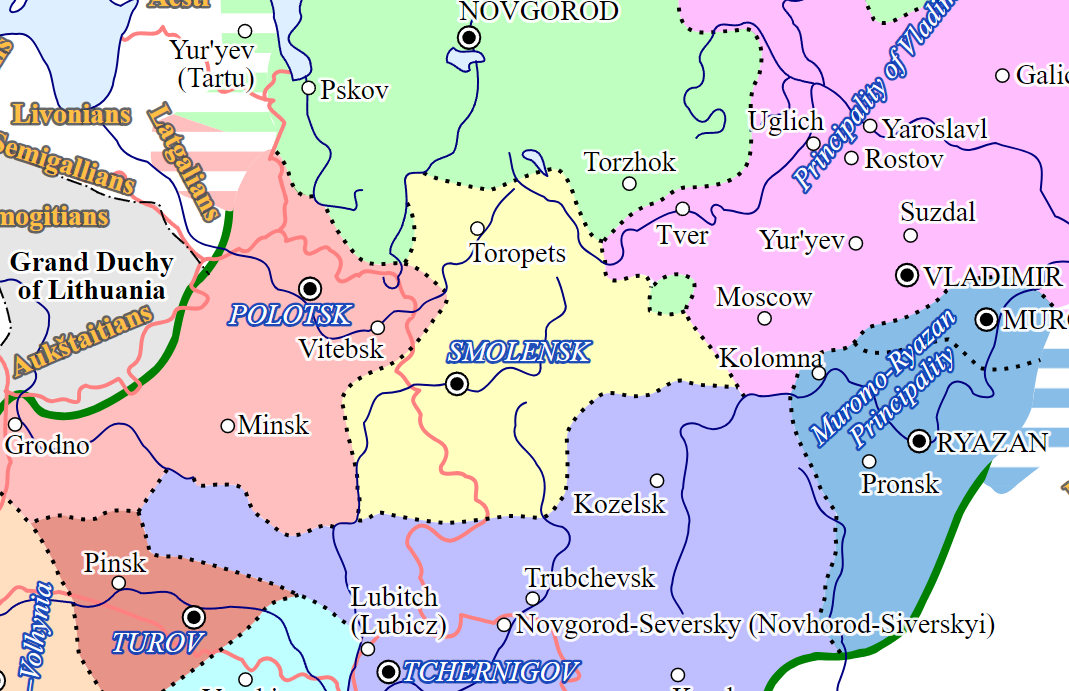
- Principality of Smolensk in 1237
- Capital: Smolensk
- Common languages: Russian
- Religion: Russian Orthodoxy
- Government: Feudal monarchy
- Prince
  - 1125–1169: Rostislav (first)
  - 1401–1404: Yury (last)
- History
  - Established: 1125
  - Disestablished: 1404
Preceded by	Succeeded by
Kievan Rus'	Grand Duchy of Lithuania

The Principality of Smolensk, (Note: Russian: Смоленское княжество; Belarusian: Смаленскае княства.) also known as the Grand Principality of Smolensk, (Note: Russian: Великое княжество Смоленское.) was a Russian principality with its capital in Smolensk.

It became an independent principality in 1125. Smolensk gradually came under Lithuanian influence and was incorporated into the Grand Duchy of Lithuania in 1404. The principality was later reorganized into the Smolensk Voivodeship in 1508.

== History ==
Located on the upper Dnieper, Smolensk emerged as a center of the Krivichi, an East Slavic tribe. It controlled access from Veliky Novgorod and Polotsk to the Dnieper downstream towards Kiev. Smolensk was therefore linked to the Baltic, the Gulf of Finland, and with the main routes east and west.

=== Early history ===
In the last four decades of the 11th century, it was a dependency of Kiev (i.e. it was governed by an appointee of the prince of Kiev). The descendants of Yaroslav I of Kiev governed the principality until 1125, starting with Vyacheslav Yaroslavich from 1054. For most of the last quarter of the 11th century and the first quarter of the 12th century, it was a possession of Vladimir II Monomakh. Following his death, his son Mstislav I Vladimirovich became the prince of Kiev and Mstislav's son Rostislav Mstislavich became the prince of Smolensk in 1125, as well as the grand prince of Kiev.

At this point, Smolensk became an independent principality. Rostislav would be the progenitor of the Rostislavichi, one of the four major branches of the Rurikid dynasty. The family held Smolensk until the early 15th century. As several princes of Smolensk served as grand princes of Kiev, they were able to assume the title of grand prince of Smolensk, with the first one to do so being Rostislav's eldest son, Roman, in 1169. Rostislav's grandson Mstislav Davidovich also appropriated the title and his descendants continued to style themselves as grand princes.

Smolensk gained its own bishop in 1136. The principality contained a number of other important cities that usually possessed subordinate status, notable among them Bryansk, Vyazma and Mozhaysk. The Rostislavichi were very active in the struggles for dynastic succession in Kiev and the other principalities. Mstislav Romanovich and Vladimir Riurikovich sat on the Kievan throne from 1212 to 1235, a few years before the Mongol invasions. By the early 13th century, Smolensk was in a stronger position compared to its neighbors as it was the least fragmented.

=== Later history ===
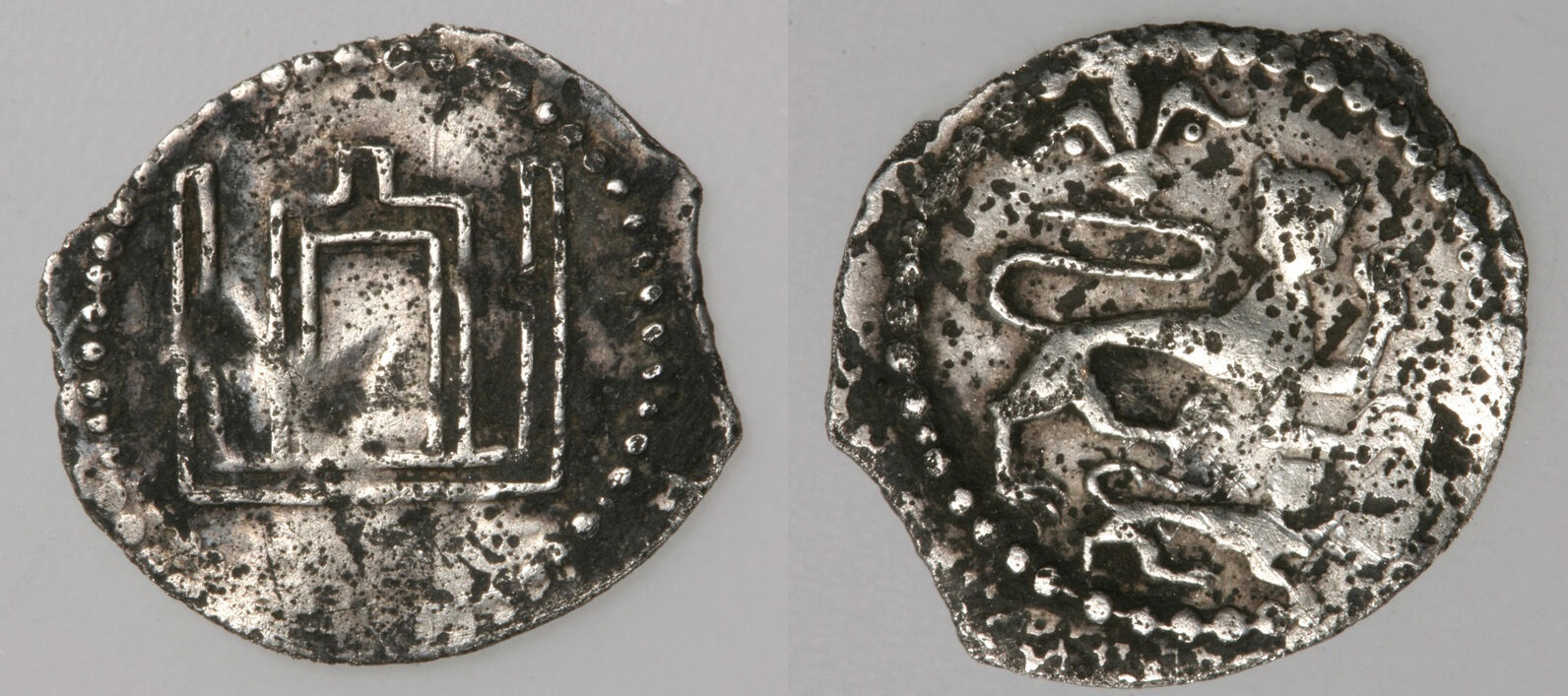
Smolensk coin with lions or leopards and the Columns of Gediminas, showing it as a vassal of Vytautas the Great, c. 1399–1401

Following the Mongol invasions, it was briefly captured by the Lithuanians in 1239, but Grand Prince Yaroslav II of Vladimir expelled them the following year. In the mid-13th century, the principality was repeatedly subjected to devastation by the troops of Lithuanian king Mindaugas. From the late 13th century, Smolensk was dependent on the Grand Principality of Vladimir. Around this time, the principalities of Mozhaysk and Vyazma emerged. Prince Fyodor Rostislavich acquired the Principality of Yaroslavl by marriage; his descendants constituted a sub-dynasty until Yaroslavl was acquired by the Grand Principality of Moscow in the late 14th century.

Around 1339, the principality came under the influence of the Grand Duchy of Lithuania. In 1340, Özbeg Khan of the Golden Horde ordered the Russian princes on a campaign against Prince Ivan Aleksandrovich due to his inability to pay the tribute; however, Grand Prince Ivan I of Moscow may have avoided participation in this campaign. In 1352, Grand Prince Simeon of Moscow marched into Smolensk and was able to extend his authority there with the removal of the pro-Lithuanian prince, who was likely replaced with either the son or nephew of Dmitry Romanovich, the prince of Bryansk. As a result, Simeon was able to temporarily halt the eastward expansion of Lithuania.

Grand Duke Algirdas of Lithuania captured Bryansk and Smolensk in 1356; however, his son-in-law, Grand Prince Ivan II of Moscow, did not provide military assistance, leading Vasily of Smolensk to turn to the khan of the Golden Horde instead. Ivan soon reversed his policy due to discontent within his court, and in 1358, he launched a joint expedition with Mozhaysk and Tver that drove the Lithuanians out of Rzhev. The following year, Algirdas launched an attack, regaining control of Smolensk and Rzhev while taking control of Mstislavl. Smolensk took part in the campaign against Moscow in 1368, but later fought alongside Moscow against Mikhail II of Tver in 1372–1374 and against the Golden Horde at the Battle of Kulikovo in 1380.

In 1386, Prince Sviatoslav Ivanovich was killed at the Battle of the Vikhra River against the Lithuanians when he supported Andrei of Polotsk and his rebellion against his younger half-brother Jogaila. However, Skirgaila, who commanded the Lithuanian forces in the battle and was wedded to Sviatoslav's niece, granted permission to Yury of Smolensk to succeed his father Sviatoslav as prince. By the 1390s, the pro-Lithuanian party in the principality grew stronger, especially after Grand Duke Vytautas married a princess of Smolensk.

Grand Prince Vasily I of Moscow married the daughter of Vytautas in 1391 and assumed the role of junior partner. When Vytautas captured Smolensk in 1395, Vasily offered no resistance and accepted the Lithuanian annexation the following year. In 1401, the people of Smolensk launched a revolt against Lithuanian rule with the support of Oleg Ivanovich of Ryazan and recalled their former prince, Yury; however, Vasily stayed neutral and Vytautas reasserted his control three years later, leading to the incorporation of the principality into the Lithuanian state as the "Smolensk land" (Smolenskaya zemlya).

Ivan III of Russia conquered one-third of Lithuanian territory in 1500–1503, including much of the Smolensk region. His successor, Vasili III of Russia, was able to capture Smolensk itself in 1514, and incorporate the last remaining ethnographically Russian territory outside the control of Moscow. However, Smolensk was lost again in 1611, during the Time of Troubles. Polish–Lithuanian rule lasted until 1654 and the city was formally ceded to Russia following the signing of the Treaty of Andrusovo in 1667.

== Geography ==
At its peak in the 12th and 13th centuries, it included territories along the basin of the Dnieper in the southwest, with the westernmost possession being Kopys (from 1116).

== Economy ==
The famous trade route from the Varangians to the Greeks passed through the principality and was an important source of income for its rulers. Trade with Riga and Visby developed during the second half of the 12th and 13th centuries. Wax was the main export followed by honey and furs; the main imports from Europe were textiles and later, salt, delicacies and wine.

== Gallery ==
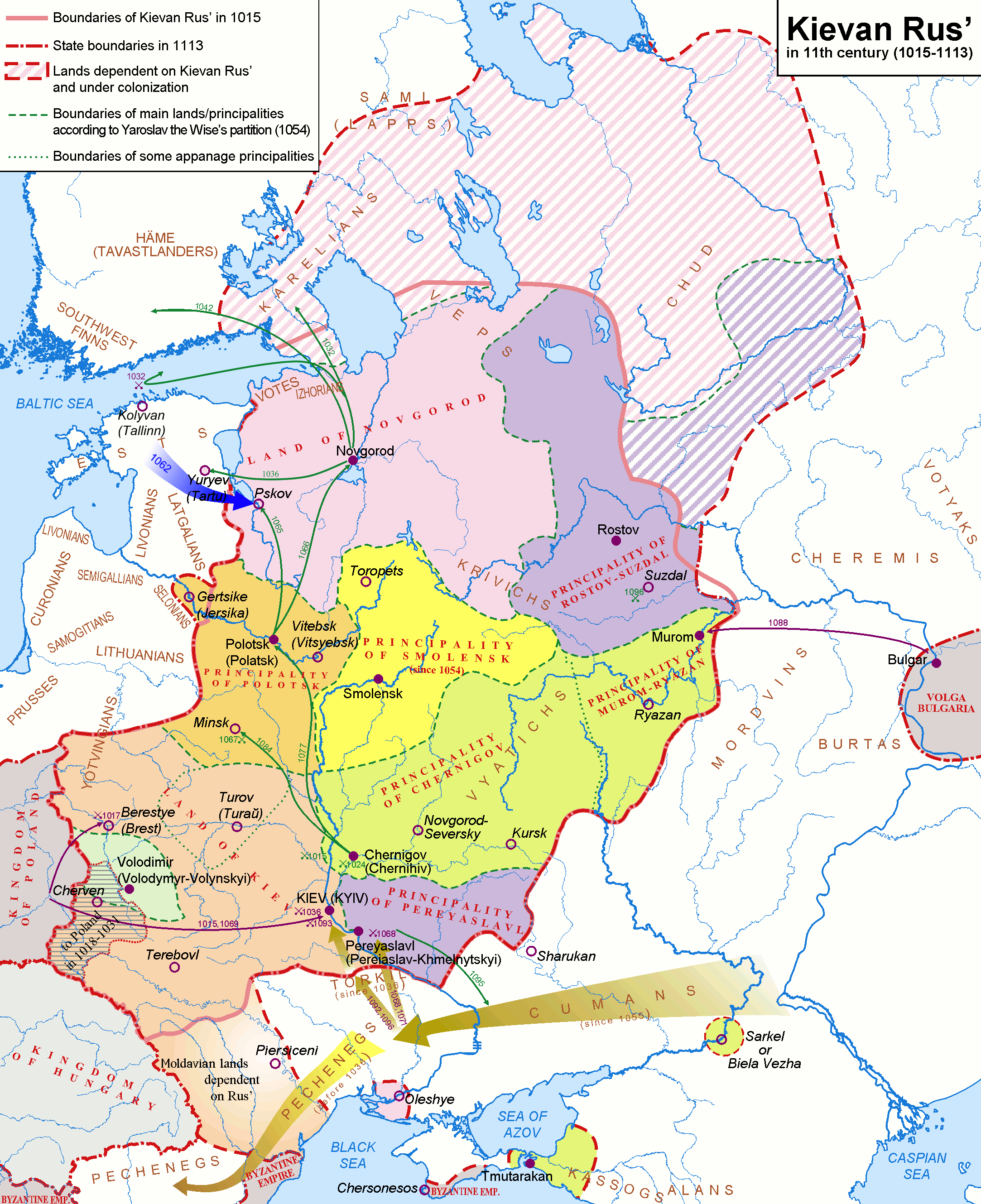
Principality of Smolensk in c. 1100

Principality of Smolensk in 1132

== See also ==
- List of wars and battles involving the Principality of Smolensk

== Bibliography ==
- "Смоленская земля" . Brockhaus and Efron Encyclopedic Dictionary (in Russian). 1906.
- Baranauskienė, Inga (February 2012). "Onos Vytautienės kilmė ir giminė" [The origin and family of Ona Vytautienė]. Kultūros barai (Cultural Barriers) (in Lithuanian). 2: 65–66. ISSN 0134-3106.
- Bushkovitch, Paul (5 December 2011). A Concise History of Russia. Cambridge University Press. ISBN 978-1-139-50444-7.
- Crummey, Robert O. (6 June 2014) [1987]. The Formation of Muscovy 1300–1613. Routledge. ISBN 978-1-317-87200-9.
- Feldbrugge, Ferdinand Joseph Maria (2009). Law in Medieval Russia. BRILL. ISBN 978-90-04-16985-2.
- Feldbrugge, Ferdinand J. M. (2 October 2017). A History of Russian Law: From Ancient Times to the Council Code (Ulozhenie) of Tsar Aleksei Mikhailovich of 1649. BRILL. ISBN 978-90-04-35214-8.
- Fennell, John (2014) [1983]. The Crisis of Medieval Russia, 1200–1304. Longman History of Russia. Routledge. ISBN 978-0-582-48150-3.
- Fennell, John L. I. (15 November 2023) [1968]. The Emergence of Moscow, 1304–1359. University of California Press. ISBN 978-0-520-34759-5.
- Kuzmin, A. V. (2015). "Смоленское княжество" [Principality of Smolensk]. In Kravets, S. L. (ed.). Большая Российская энциклопедия. Том 30: Сен-Жерменский мир 1679 — Социальное обеспечение (in Russian). Большая Российская энциклопедия. p. 504. ISBN 978-5-85270-367-5.
- Martin, Janet (2006). "North-eastern Russia and the Golden Horde (1246–1359)". The Cambridge History of Russia: Volume 1: From Early Rus' to 1689. Cambridge University Press. pp. 127–157. doi:10.1017/CHOL9780521812276.007. ISBN 978-1-139-05410-2.
- Martin, Janet (2007). Medieval Russia: 980–1584 (2nd ed.). Cambridge: Cambridge University Press. ISBN 978-0-511-36800-4.
- Shaikhutdinov, Marat (2021). Between East and West: The Formation of the Moscow State. Academic Studies Press. doi:10.2307/j.ctv249sgn2. ISBN 978-1-64469-713-9.
