= Prince of Smolensk =

The Prince of Smolensk was the kniaz, the ruler or sub-ruler, of the Rus' Principality of Smolensk, a lordship based on the city of Smolensk. It passed between different groups of descendants of Grand Prince Iaroslav I of Kiev until 1125, when following the death of Vladimir Monomakh the latter's grandson Rostislav Mstislavich was installed in the principality, while the latter's father Mstislav I Vladimirovich became Grand Prince. It gained status as a diocesan see with its own bishop in 1136. Rostislav's descendants, the Rostaslavichi, ruled the principality until the fifteenth century. Smolensk enjoyed stronger western ties than most Rus' principalities.

== Kievan Rus' (Princes of Smolensk) ==
- 1010–1015 Stanislav Vladimirovich

=== Yaroslavichi ===
- 1054–1057 Viacheslav I Yaroslavich
- 1057–1060 Igor I Yaroslavich
- 1060–1073 Sviatoslav I Yaroslavich
- 1073–1077 Vladimir I Monomakh
- 1077–1085 Vladimir II Vsevolodich

=== Monomakhovichi/Sviatoslavichi ===
- 1092-1093 Mstislav I
- 1093–1095 Iziaslav I Vladimirovich
- 1095–1097 David I Sviatoslavich
- 1097–1113 Sviatoslav II Vladimirovich and Yaropolk I
- 1113–1125 Viacheslav II Vladimirovich

=== Monomakhovichi / Rostislavichi ===
- 1125–1160 Rostislav I
- 1160–1171 Roman I (1st time)
- 1171–1172 Yaropolk II Romanovich (1st time)
- 1172–1174 Roman I (2nd time)
- 1174–1175 Yaropolk II Romanovich (2nd time)
- 1175–1176 Mstislav I Rostislavich "The Brave"
- 1176–1180 Roman I (3rd time)
- 1180–1197 David II Rostislavich
- 1197–1213 Mstislav II "The Old"
- 1213–1219 Vladimir III Rurikovich
- 1219–1230 Mstislav III Davidovich

=== Rostislavichi / Mstislavichi ===
- 1230–1232 Rostislav II Mstislavich
- 1232–1239 Sviatoslav III Mstislavich
- 1239–1249 Vsevolod I Mstislavich
- 1249–1278 Gleb I Rostislavich
- 1278–1279 Mikhail I Rostislavich
- 1279–1287 Theodore the Black
- 1297–1313 Aleksandr I Glebovich
- 1313–1359 Ivan I Aleksandrovich
- 1359–1386 Sviatoslav IV Ivanovich
- 1386–1392 Yury of Smolensk (1st time)
- 1392–1395 Gleb II Sviatoslavich
- 1395–1401 Roman II the Young, Lithuanian occupation
- 1401-1404 Yury of Smolensk (2nd time)
- since 1407 conquest by Grand Duchy of Lithuania

== Grand Duchy of Lithuania ==
=== Viceroys of Smolensk ===
- ????–???? Alexander Daszek
- ????–???? Vasil Svyatoslavich
- 1482–1486 Mikalojus Radvila the Old
- 1486–1492 Ivan Ilinicz
- 1490–1499 Yuri Glebovich
- 1499–1500 Mikalaj Ilinicz
- 1500–1503 Stanislaw Kiszka
- 1503–1507 Yury Solohub
- 1507–1508 Yury Zenovich

=== Voivodes of Smolensk ===
- since 1514 conquest by Principality of Moscow

== Principality of Moscow ==
=== Voivodes of Smolensk ===
- 1514–1517 Vasili Vasilyevich Shuisky
- 1517–1518 Boris Gorbaty
- 1520–1523 Ivan Vasilyevich Shuisky
- 1523–1525 Vasil Mykulinsky
- 1526–1527 Ivan Shchetina
- 1527–1530 Yury Pronsky
- 1531–1533 Alexander Khokholkov
- 1534–???? Nikita Obolensky, The Crippled
- 1547–???? Ivan Sredniy
- 1552–???? Ivan Zvenigorodskiy
- 1555–1556 Yury Meshcherskiy
- 1556–???? Alexei Yuryevich
- ????–???? Samson Turenin
- ????–???? Nikita Obolensky
- ????–???? Ivan Andreyevich Shuisky
- 1576–1577 Semeon Mezetsky
- 1579–???? Ivan Kurlyatev
- ????–???? Andrei Ivanovich Shuisky
- 1583–1584 Feodor Mosalsky
- 1584–1587 Andrei Zvenigorodkiy
- 1596–1602 Vasili Golitsyn
- 1602–1602 Nikita Trubetskoi
- 1602–1603 Grigori Velyaminov
- 1603–1605 Vasili Cherkassky
- 1605–???? Ivan Romodanovsky
- ????–???? Ivan Khovansky
- 1608–1611 Mikhail Shein / Peotr Gorchakov

== Polish–Lithuanian Commonwealth ==
=== Voivodes of Smolensk ===
- 1611–1621 Mikolaj Glebovich
- 1621–1621 Filon Kmita / Andrzej Sapieha
- 1625–1639 Alexander Hosevski
- 1639–1643 Krzysztof Hosevski
- 1643–1653 Yury Glebovich
- 1653–1653 Paweł Jan Sapieha
- 1653–1654 Filip Obuchowicz
