= Rostislavichi =

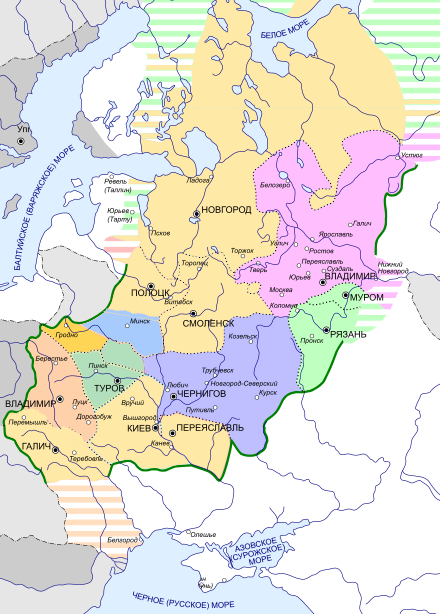
Rus' principalities controlled by Rostislavichi of Smolensk at various times (until c. 1240)

The Rostislavichi of Smolensk (Note: Belarusian: Расціславічы Смаленскія, romanized: Rastsislavichy Smalenskiya; Russian: Ростиславичи Смоленские, romanized: Rostislavichi Smolenskie; Ukrainian: Ростиславичі Смоленські, romanized: Rostyslavychi Smolens'ki.) were one of the four dominant princely clans of Kievan Rus' in the 12th and 13th century. (Note: In 12th- and 13th-century Kievan Rus', the four dominant princely clans were the Olgovichi of Chernigov, the Rostislavichi of Smolensk, the Iziaslavichi of Volhynia (based in modern Volodymyr in Volyn'), and the Yurievichi of Suzdalia (alias the Vsevolodichi of Vladimir on the Klyazma). 'Three of these clan founders – Vsevolod, Rostislav, and Iziaslav – were the grandsons of Volodimer Monomakh. The outlier from this set is Oleg, who was instead a cousin of Volodimer Monomakh.') They were one of many branches of the House of Rurik. They were one of the two senior branches of Monomakhovichi, the other being the Iziaslavichi of Volhynia.

== History ==
The Rostislavichi are named after Rostislav I Mstislavich of Kiev (died 1167), prince of Smolensk (r. 1125–1160) and intermittently prince of Kiev (modern Kyiv) since 1154. They were closely related to the Iziaslavichi of Volhynia, which descended from Rostislav's brother Iziaslav II Mstislavich of Kiev. The Rostislavichi would reign in their main patrimony, the Principality of Smolensk, from 1126 to 1404, intermittently as Grand Princes of Kiev, in Novgorod, in Pereyaslavl, in Polotsk, and Galicia. While the Vsevolodichi ceased claiming the Kievan throne after the 1272 death of Yaroslav of Tver, the Rostislavichi, Iziaslavichi and Olgovichi kept vying for it. In the 14th and early 15th century, the Rostislavichi clan lost its prominence when it was defeated and subsumed into the Ruthenian nobility of the Grand Duchy of Lithuania.

Princely branches of Kiev from Yaroslav the Wise until 1169

Volodimerovichi; Yaroslav the Wise
Sviatoslav II	Vsevolod I
Olgovichi of Chernigov; Oleg I of Chernigov	Davyd of Chernigov	Monomakhovichi; Vladimir II Monomakh
Vsevolod II	Igor II	Iziaslav III	Mstislavichi; Mstislav I	Yaropolk II	Viacheslav	Yurievichi of Suzdalia; Yuri Dolgorukiy
Sviatoslav III	Izyaslavichi of Volhynia; Iziaslav II	Rostislavichi of Smolensk; Rostislav I	Vladimir III	Andrey; Bogolyubsky	Gleb	Mikhail
Mstislav II

== Bibliography ==
- Martin, Janet (2007). Medieval Russia: 980–1584. Second Edition. E-book. Cambridge: Cambridge University Press. ISBN 978-0-511-36800-4.
- Raffensperger, Christian; Ostrowski, Donald (2023). The Ruling Families of Rus: Clan, Family and Kingdom. London: Reaktion Books. p. 309. ISBN 978-1-78914-745-2. (e-book)
