= Mstislav Rostislavich of Smolensk =

Mstislav Rostislavich (c. 1143? – 1180), known as "the Brave" (Russian: Мстислав Ростиславич Храбрый, romanized: Mstislav Rostislavich Khrabry), was Prince of Smolensk (r. 1175–1177) and Prince of Novgorod (r. 1179–1180).

== Biography ==
Mstislav was the fourth of five sons (and the eighth of nine children) of Rostislav Mstislavich, the Rostislavichi of Smolensk progenitor who was briefly Grand Prince of Kiev in 1167.

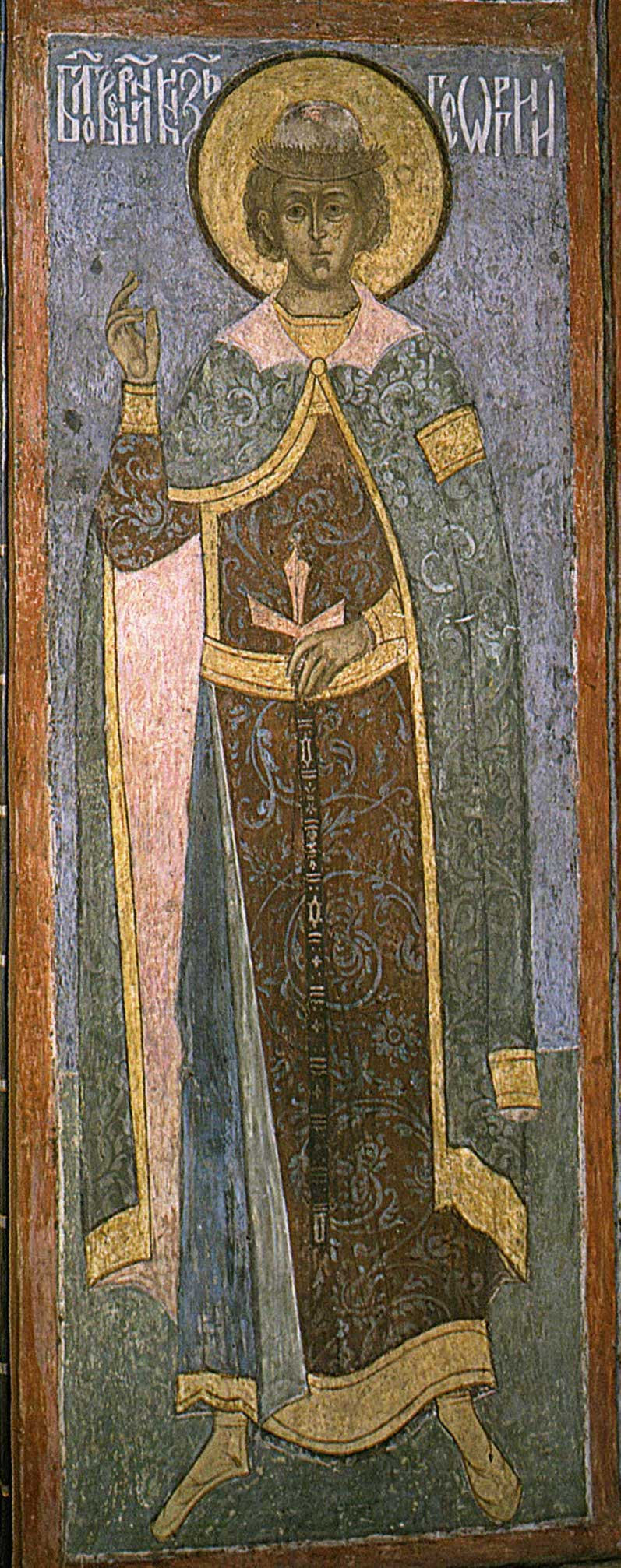
Prince Mstislav, fresco from the Cathedral of the Archangel (17th century)

Mstislav was Prince of Belgorod in 1161 and again from 1171 to 1173, Prince of Toropets since 1167, and Prince of Smolensk from 1175 to 1177. In 1168, he was one of thirteen princes of Rus' who, under Grand Prince Mstislav Iziaslavich, defeated the Polovtsy in a major battle on the steppe. The following year, he and his brother Roman along with Yury Bogolyubsky, besieged Novgorod the Great, but Bogolyubsky's army was defeated in battle. In 1171, Mstislav and his brothers helped place their uncle, Vladimir Mstislavich of Dorogobuzh, on the Kievan throne, although he was soon deposed. In 1172 and 1173, Mstislav also helped his brothers, Roman Rostislavich and then Rurik, take the throne in Kiev (indeed, Riurik sat on the Kievan throne seven times).

In 1174, Andrey Bogolyubsky sent an ambassador to Kiev to demand that the Rostislavichi leave the city and return it to Andrey's branch of the family. In reply, Mstislav shaved the head and beard of an envoy and sent him back to Andrey, an act which was not only a sign of disrespect, but may also be seen as a forcible tonsure of the man. It was also in violation of the law as the Russkaya Pravda set a fine of 12 grivnas for shaving a man's beard. For this offense, Andrey attacked Mstislav and besieged him in the town of Vyshgorod for nine weeks but was unable to take him or the city.

In 1179, Mstislav was elected prince of Novgorod (his older brothers, Roman, Sviatoslav, and David had also been chosen princes of Novgorod) and entered the city on 1 November 1179. He led the Novgorodians against the Chud (Finnic tribes in modern-day Russia or Estonia) during the winter of 1179–1180, but fell ill the following spring and died on 14 June 1180. He was buried following a divine liturgy presided over by Archbishop Ilya of Novgorod, the hegumens of the Novgorodian monasteries, and the Novgorodian clergy.

== Marriages and children ==
Mstislav's first wife was Feodosiya Rostislavna of Ryazan.

- Mstislav Mstislavich Udaloy (The Daring), was one of the most important princes of Rus' in the decades before the Mongol invasion, and one of the few to escape from the Battle of Kalka River alive.

Mstislav Rostislavich also had two sons by his second wife:

- Vladimir Mstislavich of Pskov
- David.

== Legacy and veneration ==
In literature, Mstislav is addressed by the narrator in The Tale of Igor's Campaign along with his brother Roman, when the narrator calls on the great princes of Rus' to band together to fight the nomadic invaders. Mstislav, however, had been dead six years before Igor's campaign took place, so the call to arms would have gone unheeded. Mstislav's brothers, Riurik and David are also addressed in an earlier stanza of the poem. The Kievan Chronicle (Hypatian Codex) called Mstislav the "Jewel" (украшение) of the Rus' princes, saying that he warred only for glory, despised gold and silver, gave all his booty to the church and was universally loved.

By his baptismal name of "Georgii", Mstislav has been a canonized as a saint by the Russian Orthodox Church, as well as the Ukrainian Orthodox Church – Kyiv Patriarchate (UOC-KP). His feast day is 14 OS/27 June NS. His remains were uncovered in 1634 and found to be incorrupt. His remains now lie in a gypsum sarcophagus along the south wall of the Chapel of the Nativity of the Mother of God in the Cathedral of Holy Wisdom in Novgorod the Great across the chapel from Bishop St. Nikita. (Mstislav Rostislavich of Rostov is buried in the crypt below the cathedral.)

== Bibliography ==
=== Primary sources ===
- Kievan Chronicle (c. 1200), preserved in the Hypatian Codex (c. 1425) and the Khlebnikov Codex (c. 1560).
  - Shakhmatov, Aleksey Aleksandrovich, ed. (1908). Ipat'evskaya letopis' Ипатьевская лѣтопись [The Hypatian Codex]. Complete Collection of Russian Chronicles (PSRL) (in Church Slavic). Vol. 2 (3rd ed.). Saint Petersburg: Typography of M. A. Aleksandrov / Izbornyk. pp. 285–301.
  - (modern English translation) Heinrich, Lisa Lynn (1977). The Kievan Chronicle: A Translation and Commentary (PhD diss.). Nashville, Tennessee: Vanderbilt University. p. 616. ProQuest 7812419
  - (modern Ukrainian translation) Makhnovets, Leonid (1989). Літопис Руський за Іпатським списком [Rus' Chronicle according to the Hypatian Codex] (in Ukrainian). Kyiv: Dnipro. p. 591. ISBN 5-308-00052-2. — A modern annotated Ukrainian translation of the Kievan Chronicle based on the Hypatian Codex with comments from the Khlebnikov Codex.
- Suzdalian Chronicle (c. 1203), preserved in the Laurentian Codex (1377) and other manuscripts.
  - Лаврентьевская летопись [Laurentian Chronicle]. Полное Собрание Русских Литописей [Complete Collection of Rus' Chronicles]. Vol. 1. Leningrad: USSR Academy of Sciences Publishing House. 1926–1928.
- Novgorod First Chronicle (NPL, c. 13th–15th centuries)
  - Izbornyk (1950). "Новгородская Первая Летопись Старшего Извода (синодальный Список)" [Novgorod First Chronicle of the Older Edition (Synodal Scroll).]. Izbornyk (in Church Slavic). Moscow / Leningrad: Academy of Sciences of the USSR.
  - (modern English translation) Michell, Robert; Forbes, Nevill (1914). The Chronicle of Novgorod 1016–1471. Translated from the Russian by Robert Michell and Nevill Forbes, Ph.D. Reader in Russian in the University of Oxford, with an introduction by C. Raymond Beazley and A. A. Shakhmatov (PDF). London: Gray's Inn. p. 237.

=== Literature ===
- Martin, Janet (2007). Medieval Russia: 980–1584. Second Edition. E-book. Cambridge: Cambridge University Press. ISBN 978-0-511-36800-4.

Mstislav Rostislavich Rostislavichi of Smolensk Born: 1143? Died: 1180
Regnal titles
Preceded by Iaropolk Romanovich	Prince of Smolensk; 1175–1177	Succeeded by Roman Rostislavich
Preceded by Roman Rostislavich	Prince of Novgorod; 1179–1180	Succeeded by Vladimir III Svyatoslavich
