= Roman I of Kiev =

Roman Rostislavich (Ukrainian and Russian: Роман Ростиславич; died 1180) was Prince of Smolensk (1160–1172; 1177–1180), Grand Prince of Kiev (1171–1173; 1175–1177), and Prince of Novgorod (1178–1179). He was the son of Rostislav Mstislavich.

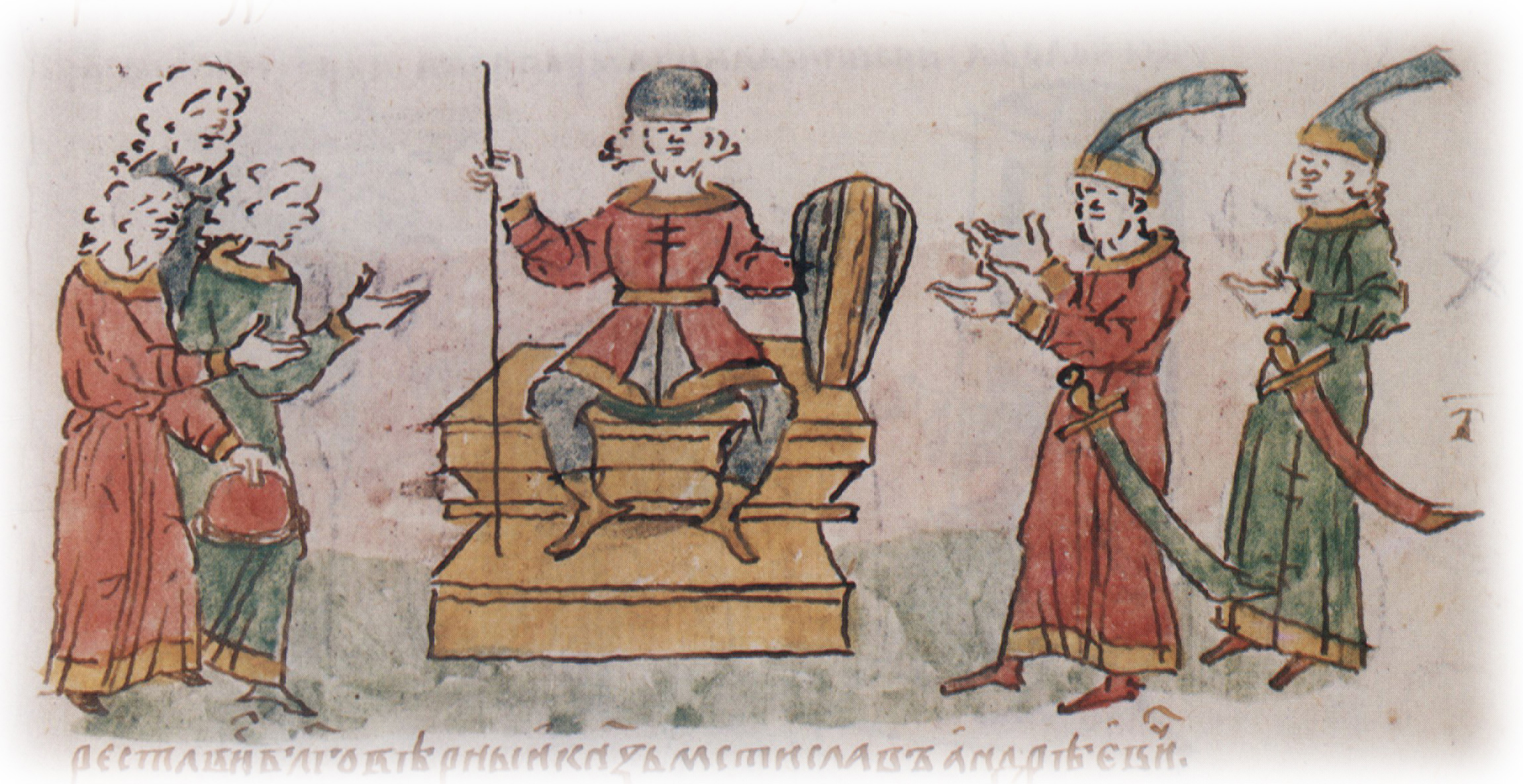
Roman on the throne, miniature from the Radziwiłł Chronicle (15th century)

Temporarily installed as grand prince of Kiev in July 1171, he was quickly replaced by Andrey Bogolyubsky's brother, Mikhail of Vladimir.

He had a son: Mstislav III of Kiev.

== Bibliography ==
- Pelenski, Jaroslaw (1988). "The Contest for the "Kievan Succession" (1155–1175): The Religious-Ecclesiastical Dimension". Harvard Ukrainian Studies. 12/13: 761–780. JSTOR 41036344. Proceedings of the International Congress Commemorating the Millennium of Christianity in Rus'-Ukraine (1988/1989).

== Succession ==
Roman Rostislavich Rostislavichi of Smolensk Died: 1180
Regnal titles
Preceded by Rostislav Mstislavich	Prince of Smolensk; 1160–1172	Succeeded by Iaropolk Romanovich
Preceded by Mstislav Rostislavich "The Brave"	Prince of Smolensk; 1177–1180	Succeeded by Davyd Rostislavich
Preceded by Iaropolk Rostislavich	Prince of Novgorod; 1178–1179	Succeeded by Mstislav Rostislavich "The Brave"
Preceded by Mikhail I	Grand Prince of Kiev; 1171–1173	Succeeded by Vsevolod III
Preceded by Yaroslav II	Grand Prince of Kiev; 1175–1177	Succeeded by Sviatoslav III
