= Iziaslav III of Kiev =

Grand Prince of Kiev (r. 1154–1155; 1157–1158; 1161)

Izyaslav III Davydovich
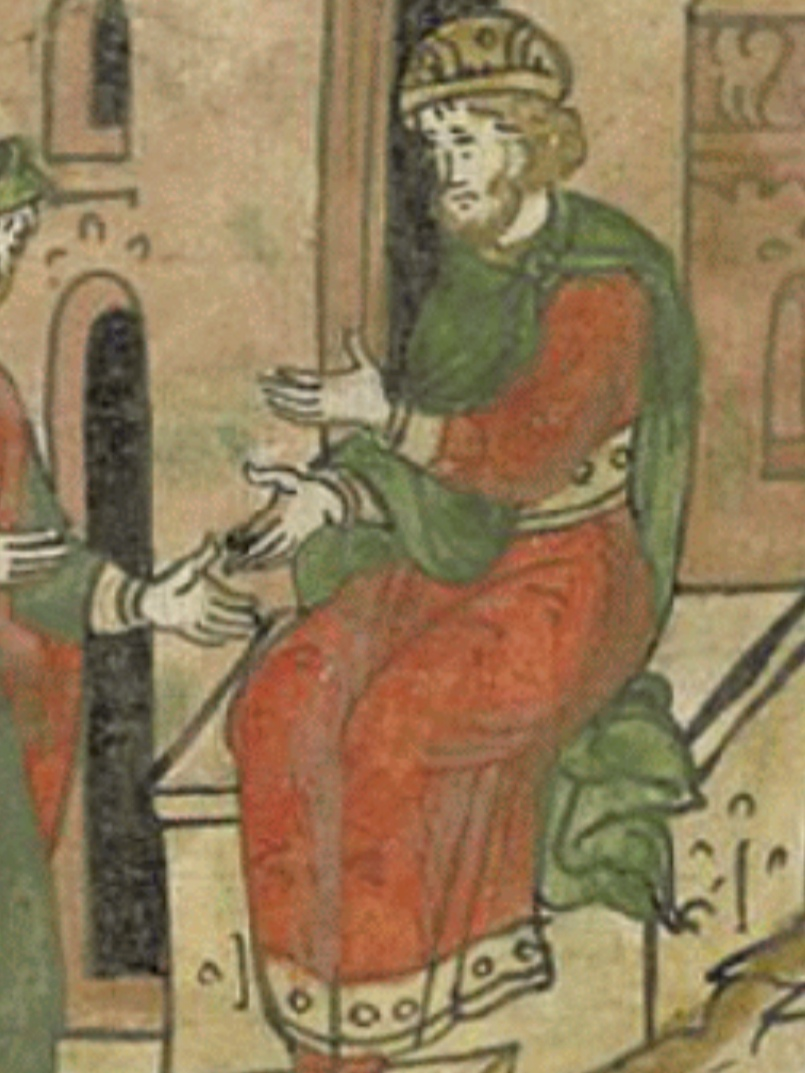
- Izyaslav III depicted in Facial Chronicle, 16th century

Prince of Chernigov
- Reign: 1151–1154
- Predecessor: Vladimir Davydovich
- Successor: Sviatoslav Olgovich

Grand Prince of Kiev (first)
- Reign: late 1154 – March 1155
- Predecessor: Rostislav I of Kiev
- Successor: Yuri Dolgorukiy

Grand Prince of Kiev (second)
- Reign: 19 May 1157 – autumn 1158
- Predecessor: Yuri Dolgorukiy
- Successor: Mstislav II of Kiev

Grand Prince of Kiev (third)
- Reign: 12 February – 6 March 1161
- Predecessor: Rostislav I of Kiev
- Successor: Rostislav I of Kiev
- Born: Unknown
- Died: 1161; Chernigov
- House: Sviatoslavichi
- Father: Davyd Sviatoslavich
- Religion: Eastern Orthodox Christianity

Izyaslav III Davydovich (Note: Russian: Изяслав III Давыдович; Ukrainian: Ізяслав Давидович) (died 1161) was Prince of Chernigov and Grand Prince of Kiev (1154–1155; 1157–1158; 1161). He was the son of Davyd Sviatoslavich of Chernigov.

== Notes ==
Preceded by George I	Grand Prince of Kiev; 1154–1155; 1157–1158; 1161	Succeeded by Rostislav I
