= Rostislav I of Kiev =

Grand Prince of Kiev (r. 1154–1155; 1159–1161; 1161–1167)

Rostislav I Mstislavich of Kiev
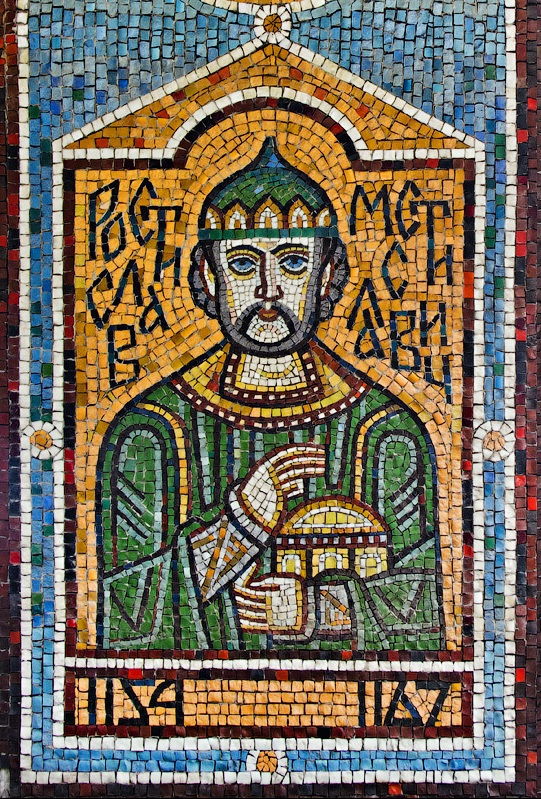

Grand Prince of Kiev
- Reign: December 1154; April 1159 – February 1161; March 1161 – March 1167

Prince of Smolensk
- Reign: 1127 – March 1167

Prince of Novgorod
- Reign: 1154 – 1154
- Born: c.1110 Kiev, Kievan Rus
- Died: 14 Mars 1167
- Issue: Davyd Rostislavich; Mstislav Rostislavich; Roman I of Kiev; Rurik Rostislavich; Elena Rostislavna; Agrafena Rostislavna
- House: Rurikids
- Father: Mstislav I of Kiev
- Mother: Christina Ingesdotter of Sweden

Rostislav I Mstislavich (Note: Russian: Ростисла́в Мстисла́вич; Belarusian: Расціслаў Мсціславіч; Ukrainian: Ростисла́в Мстисла́вич) (c. 1110 – 1167) was Prince of Smolensk (1125–1160), Novgorod (1154) and Grand Prince of Kiev (1154–1155; 1159–1161; 1161–1167). He is the founder of the Rostislavichi branch of Rurikid princes in Smolensk. He was the son of Mstislav I of Kiev and Christina Ingesdotter of Sweden.

== Reign ==
After Yaroslav II of Kiev was driven out of Novgorod, Rostislav was invited to become the ruler of Novgorod. He accepted, and became the prince on April 17, 1154. Then, learning that Iziaslav II had died, Rostislav left Novgorod to take the Kievan throne. Indignant that their prince had abandoned them and angered that "he did not make order among them, but tore them more apart", the citizens of Novgorod drove out Rostislav's son, Davyd, who was their governor. They replaced him with Mstislav Yurievich, the son of Yury Dolgoruky.

Rostislav ruled Kiev for one week before Iziaslav III of Kiev forced him to flee to Chernigov.

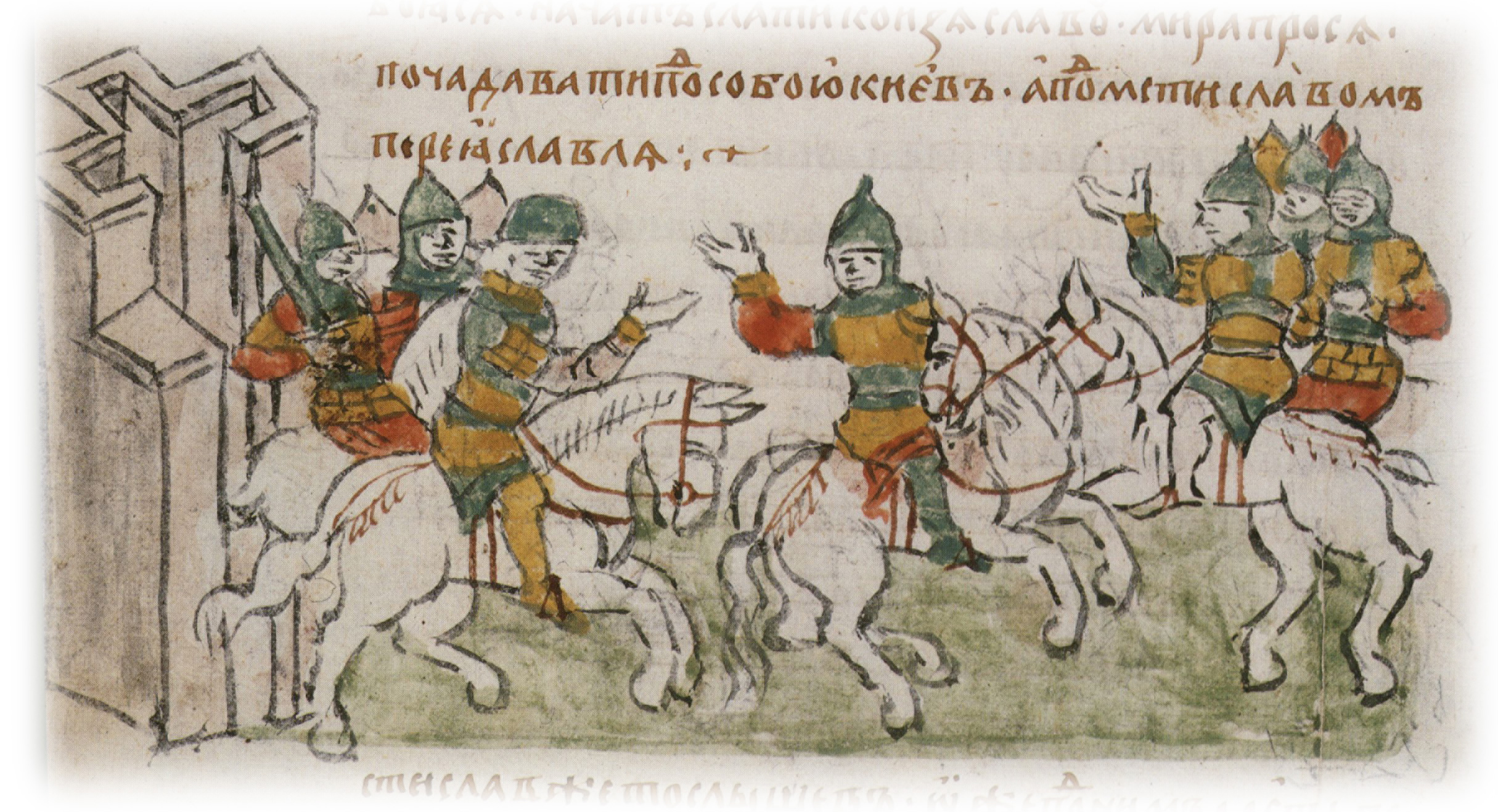
Attempts at negotiations between Rostislav Smolensky and Izyaslav Davydovich and Gleb Yuryevich who came out against him, miniature from the Radziwiłł Chronicle (15th century)

== Issue ==
Rostislav had four sons:

- Davyd Rostislavich, prince of Smolensk (1180–1197);
- Mstislav Rostislavich, prince of Smolensk (1175–1177);
- Roman I of Kiev, prince of Smolensk (1160–1172; 1177–1180), prince of Kiev (1171–1173; 1175–1177); and
- Rurik Rostislavich, prince of Belgorod (1173–1194), intermittently prince of Kiev.

He also had two daughters:

- Elena Rostislavna of Kiev-Smolensk (died 1204); and
- Agrafena Rostislavna (died 1237).

== Bibliography ==
- Martin, Janet (2007). Medieval Russia: 980–1584. Second Edition. E-book. Cambridge: Cambridge University Press. ISBN 978-0-511-36800-4.

Rostislav Mstislavich Rostislavichi of Smolensk Born: ± 1110 Died: 1167
Regnal titles
Unknown	Prince of Smolensk; 1125–1160	Succeeded by Roman Rostislavich
Preceded by Iaroslav Iziaslavich	Prince of Novgorod; 1154	Succeeded by Davyd Rostislavich
Preceded by Iziaslav II Mstislavich	Grand Prince of Kiev; 1154	Succeeded by Izyaslav III Davidovich
Preceded by Izyaslav III Davidovich	Grand Prince of Kiev; 1159–1167	Succeeded by Mstislav II
