= Gleb of Kiev =

Former Prince of Kursk

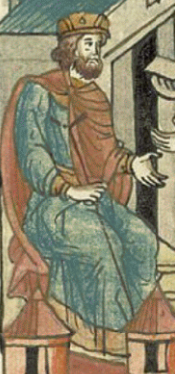
Gleb depicted in the Illustrated Chronicle of Ivan the Terrible (16th century)

Gleb Yurievich (Note: Russian: Глеб Юрьевич; Ukrainian: Гліб Юрійович) (died 1171) was Prince of Kursk (1147), Kanev (1149), Pereyaslavl (1155–1169), and Grand Prince of Kiev (1169-1170; 1170–1171). He was a son of Yuri Dolgorukiy.

== In popular culture ==
He appears in Louis L'Amour's historical novel The Walking Drum.

Preceded by Mstislav II	Grand Prince of Kiev; 1169-1170	Succeeded by Mstislav II
Preceded by Mstislav II	Grand Prince of Kiev; 1170-1171	Succeeded by Vladimir III
