= Mstislav III of Kiev =

Russian prince (died 1223)

Mstislav Romanovich the Old (Note: Russian: Мстислав Романович Старый; Ukrainian: Мстислав Романович Старий) (died 1223) was Prince of Pskov (1179–?), Smolensk (1197–?), Belgorod (1206), Galich (?–?) and Grand Prince of Kiev (1212–1223). He was the son of Roman Rostislavich.

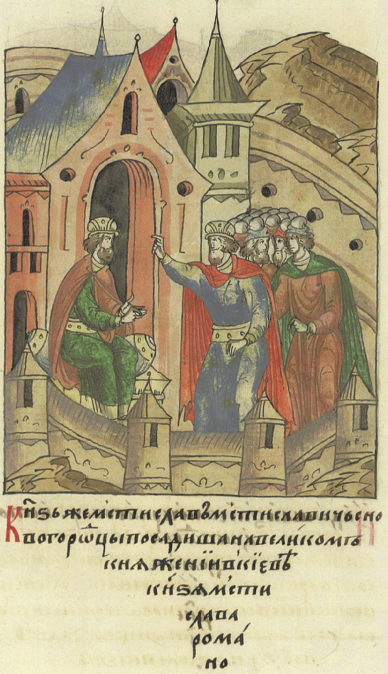
Enthronement of Mstislav III, miniature from the Illustrated Chronicle of Ivan the Terrible (16th century)

== Reign ==
Mstislav defeated an invading Hungarian army in 1221. In April 1223, the Mongols of Genghis Khan sent an envoy of ten ambassadors to negotiate a surrender or alliance. The Rus' haughtily executed them all. The Mongol commanders Subutai and Jebe defeated and captured him three days after the Battle of the Kalka River at a palisade on a nearby hill. According to the Novgorod First Chronicle, of the large Kievan Rus' army sent out to fight the Mongols, only "every tenth returned to his home." .

An account of Mstislav's execution after the battle is described in Jack Weatherford's historical book Genghis Khan and the Making of the Modern World:

At the end of the campaign, Subutai and Jebe led their soldiers down to spend a relaxing spring in the Crimea on the Black Sea. They celebrated their victory with a great drunken party that lasted for days. The guest of honor was the defeated Prince Mstislav and his two sons-in-law, but their treatment showed how much the Mongols had changed since the time of Genghis Khan. The Mongols wrapped the three of them in felt rugs, as befitted high-ranking aristocrats, and stuffed them beneath the floorboards of their ger, thereby slowly, but bloodlessly, crushing the men as the Mongols drank and sang through the night on the floor above them. It was important to the Mongols that the Russians understand the severe penalty for killing ambassadors, and it was equally as important for the Mongol leaders to reaffirm to their own men the extent to which they would always be willing to go to avenge the unjust killing of a Mongol.

== Notes ==
Preceded by Vsevolod IV	Grand Prince of Kiev; 1212–1223	Succeeded by Vladimir III
