= Old East Slavic =

Slavic language used in the 7th–14th centuries

- рѹсьскъ ꙗзыкъ
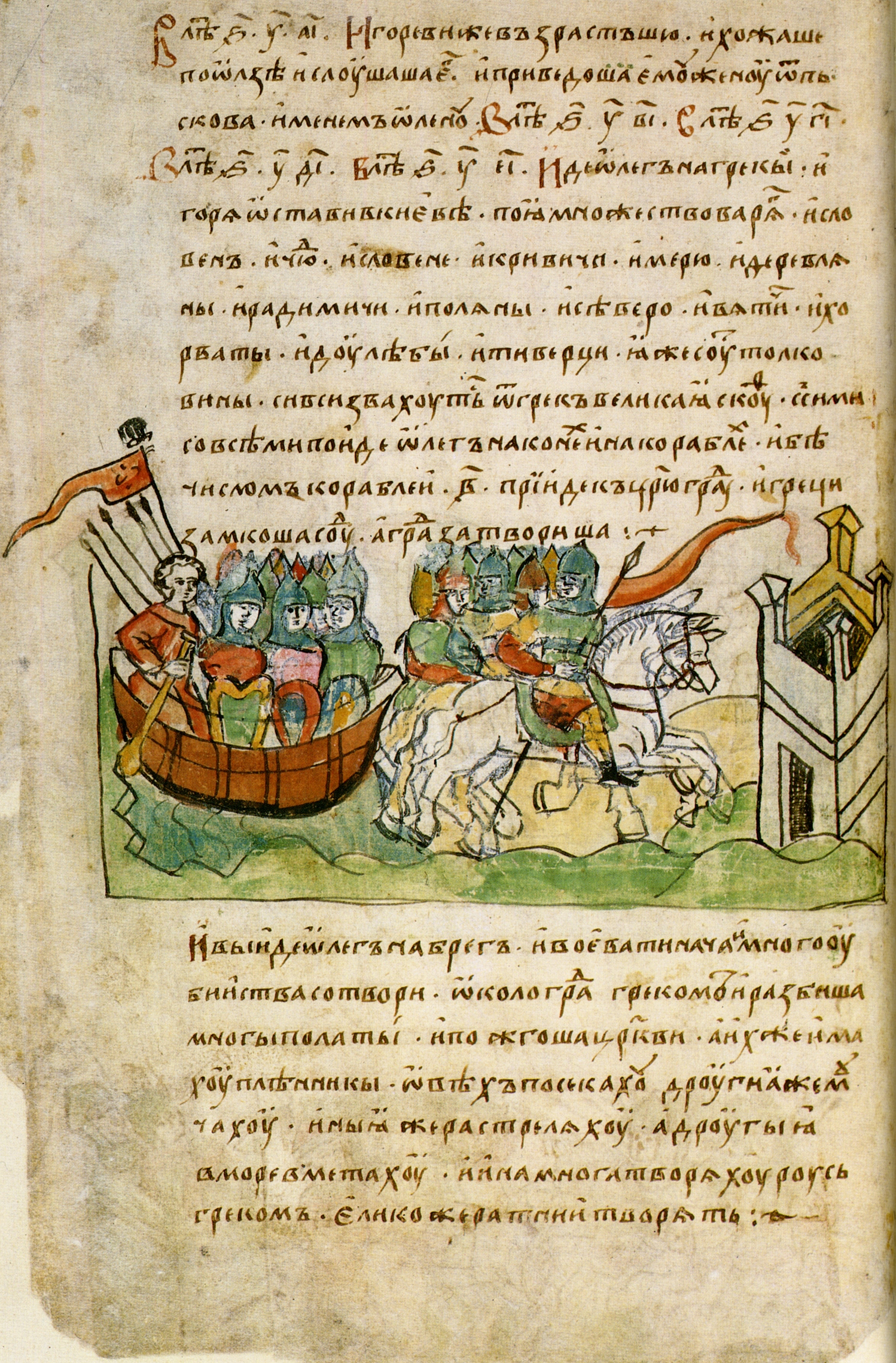
- Sheet from the Radziwiłł Chronicle
- Region: Eastern Europe
- Era: 7th or 8th century to the 13th or 14th century developed into Middle Russian and Ruthenian
- Language family: Indo-European: Balto-Slavic; Slavic; East Slavic; Old East Slavic
- Writing system: Early Cyrillic alphabet

Language codes
- ISO 639-3: orv
- Glottolog: oldr1238

Old East Slavic (Note: Belarusian: старажытнаруская мова, romanized: starazhytnaruskaya mova; Russian: древнерусский язык, romanized: drevnerusskiy yazyk; Rusyn: старорускій язык, romanized: staroruskiy yazyk; Ukrainian: давньоруська мова, romanized: davnioruska mova) (traditionally also Old Russian) was a language (or a group of dialects) used by the East Slavs from the 7th or 8th century to the 13th or 14th century, until it diverged into the Russian and Ruthenian languages. Ruthenian eventually evolved into the Belarusian, Rusyn, and Ukrainian languages.

== Terminology ==
The term Old East Slavic is used in reference to the common ancestor of the modern family of East Slavic languages. However, it is not universally applied. The language is also traditionally known as Old Russian; however, the term may be viewed as anachronistic. In English, the adjective Russian historically translates both русский (pertaining to modern Russia) and русьский (pertaining to medieval Rus'), which can conflate the common ancestor of all East Slavic languages with modern Russian. Because the initial stages of the language which it denotes predate the dialectal divisions marking the nascent distinction between modern East Slavic languages, a number of authors have proposed using Old East Slavic as a more appropriate and neutral term. While Old Russian is sometimes used for the written language in Russia up to the 18th century, linguists usually divide this span into two periods: the early common stage (often called Old East Slavic) and the later period after the split, known as Middle Russian. (Note: historically Great Russian)

Some scholars have also called the language Old Rus'ian or Old Rusan, Rusian, or simply Rus, although these are the least commonly used forms.

Ukrainian-American linguist George Shevelov used the term Common Russian or Common Eastern Slavic to refer to the hypothetical uniform language of the East Slavs.

American Slavist Alexander M. Schenker pointed out that modern terms for the medieval language of the East Slavs varied depending on the political context. He suggested using the neutral term East Slavic for that language. However, this view has recently been challenged. Based on a comprehensive linguistic analysis of the corpus identified by Schenker, the Polish Slavist Joanna Getka and the Ukrainian linguist and dialectologist Viktor Moisiienko have argued that there was, in fact, no single Old East Slavic language. Instead, they demonstrate that from as early as the eleventh century distinct written traditions were already developing within the lands of Rus', reflecting the emergence of separate linguistic and cultural communities rather than a unified East Slavic linguistic continuum.

== Phonology ==
=== Vowels ===
Early Old East Slavic Oral vowels
		Front	Back	
		Front	Unrounded	Rounded
Close	Tense	и /i/	ꙑ /ɯ/	у /u/
Close	Lax	ь /ɪ/	ъ /ʊ/	
Open	Lax	е /e/		о /ɔ/
Open	Tense	ѣ /eː/	a /ɑ/	

Nasal vowels
Front	Back
ѧ /ɛ̃/	ѫ /ɔ̃/

Note that there were also iotated variants: ꙗ, ѥ, ю, ѩ, ѭ.

Late Old East Slavic Oral vowels
		Front	Back	
		Front	Unrounded	Rounded
Close	Tense	и /i/	ꙑ /ɯ/	у /u/
Open	Lax	е /e/		о /ɔ/
Open	Tense	ѣ /eː/	a /a/	

The nasal vowels ѧ and ѫ had merged with ꙗ and у respectively at a very early stage (around the 10th century), prior to the writing of the earliest surviving manuscripts. Later, during the 11th–13th centuries, the yers ь and ъ either became silent (in "weak" positions) or vocalized into е and о (in "strong" positions) under Havlík's law.

=== Consonants ===
Old East Slavic consonant phonemes
		Labial	Dental/ Alveolar	Palatal	Velar
Nasal		m	n	nʲ	
Plosive	voiceless	p	t		k
Plosive	voiced	b	d		ɡ
Affricate	voiceless		t͡sʲ	t͡ɕ	
Affricate	voiced				
Fricative	voiceless		s	ɕ, sʲ	x
Fricative	voiced		z	ʑ	
Lateral			l	lʲ	
Approximant		ʋ	r	rʲ j	

Old East Slavic retains almost all the consonants of Proto-Slavic, with the exception of the palatal stops *ť and *ď, which merged with the pre-existing phonemes /č/ and /ž/ respectively.

Prior to the fall of the yers (11th–13th centuries), palatalization of consonants was positional (allophonic) before front vowels. The loss of the yers transformed palatalization into a contrastive, phonemic feature of the language.

== General considerations ==
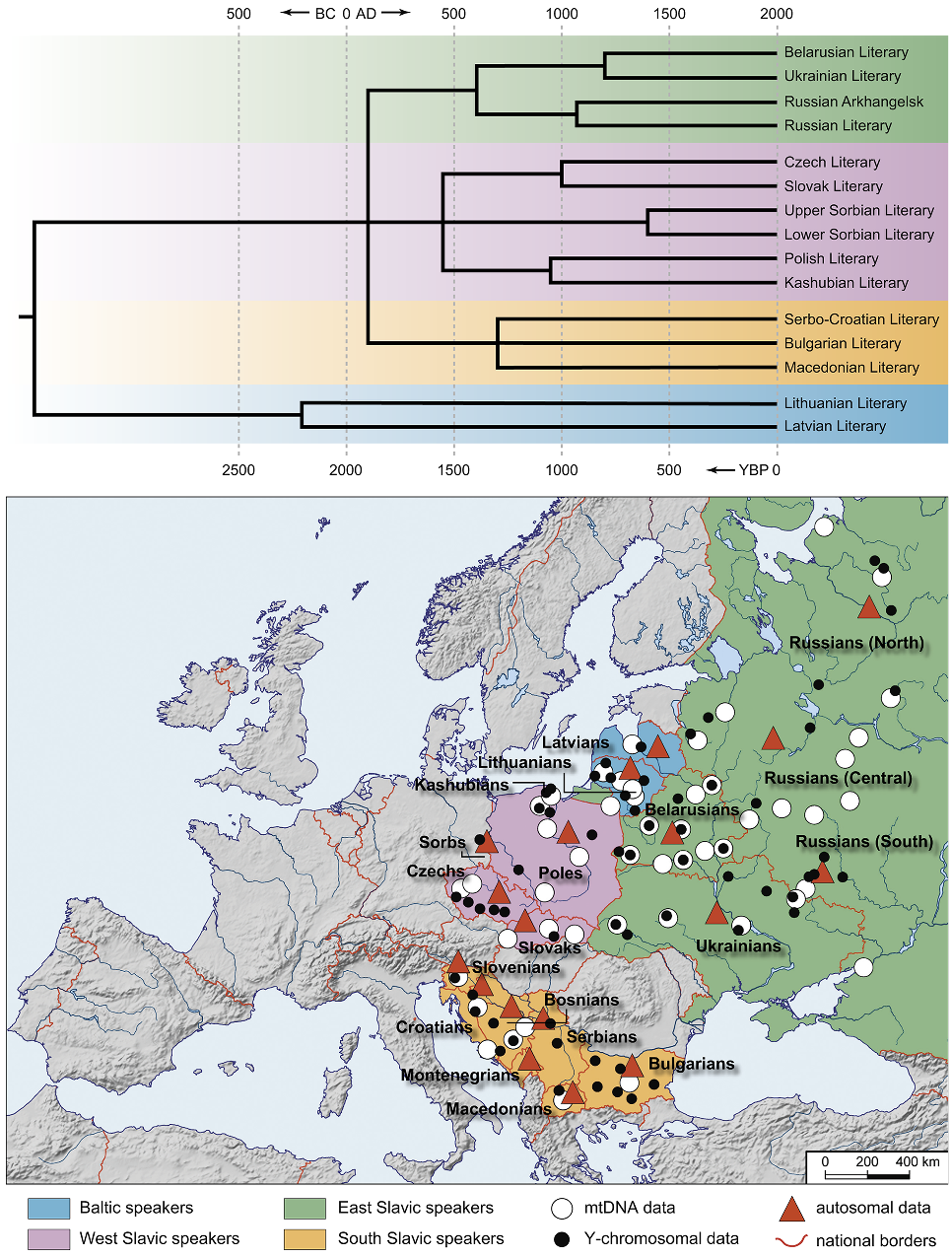
Map and tree of Balto-Slavic languages, according to Kassian and A. Dybo

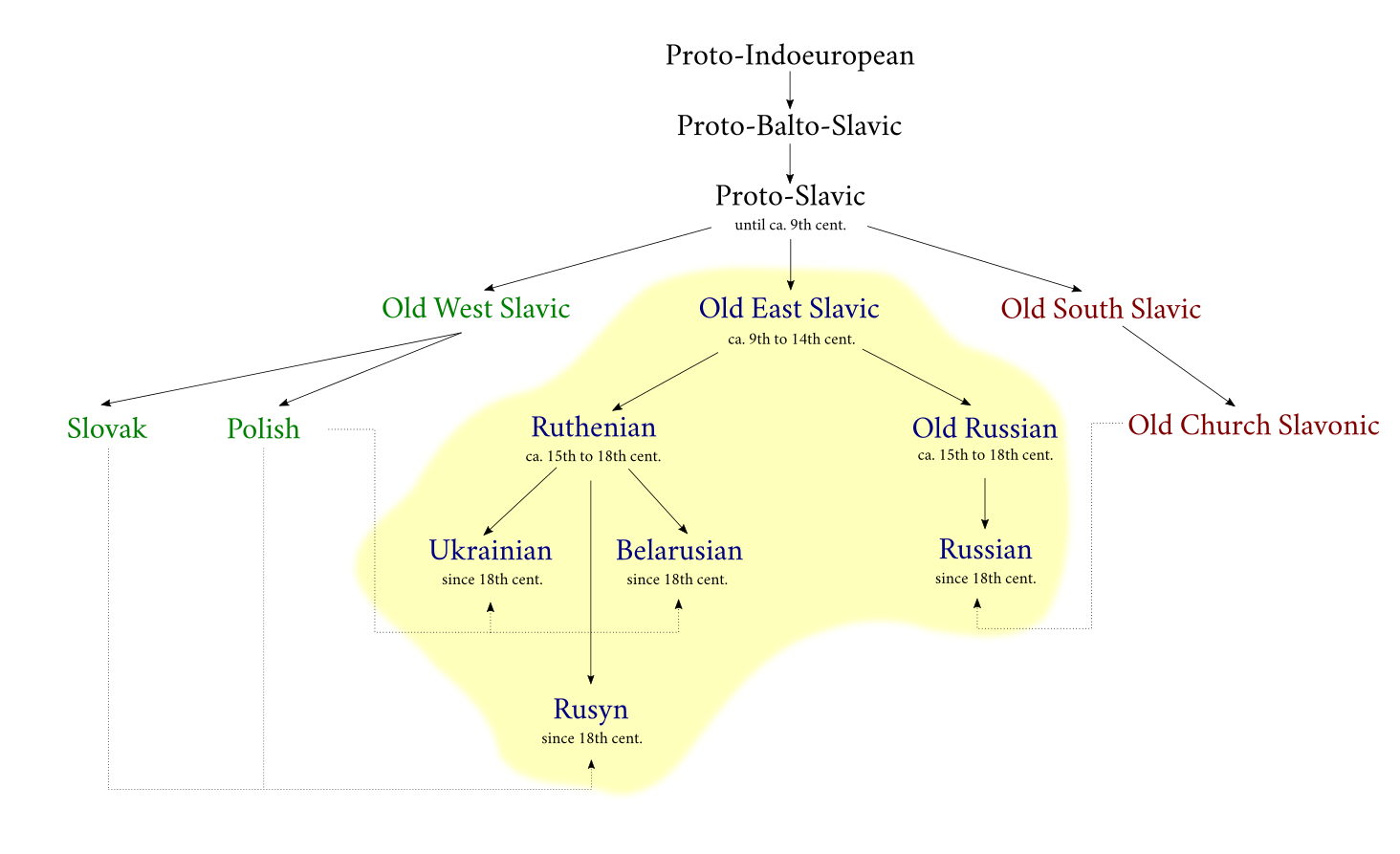
Development of the East Slavic languages

The language was a descendant of the Proto-Slavic language and retained many of its features. It developed so-called pleophony (or polnoglasie 'full vocalisation'), which came to differentiate the newly evolving East Slavic from other Slavic dialects. For instance, Common Slavic *gȏrdъ 'settlement, town' was reflected as OESl. gorodъ, Common Slavic *melkò 'milk' > OESl. moloko, and Common Slavic *kòrva 'cow' > OESl korova. Other Slavic dialects differed by resolving the closed-syllable clusters *eRC and *aRC as liquid metathesis (South Slavic and West Slavic), or by no change at all (see the article on Slavic liquid metathesis and pleophony for a detailed account).

Since extant written records of the language are sparse, it is difficult to assess the level of its unity. In consideration of the number of tribes and clans that constituted Kievan Rus', it is probable that there were many dialects of Old East Slavic. Therefore, today we may speak definitively only of the languages of surviving manuscripts, which, according to some interpretations, show regional divergence from the beginning of the historical records. By c. 1150, it had the weakest local variations among the four regional macrodialects of Common Slavic, c. 800 – c. 1000, which had just begun to differentiate into its branches.

With time, it evolved into several more diversified forms; following the fragmentation of Kievan Rus' after 1100, dialectal differentiation accelerated. The regional languages were distinguishable starting in the 12th or 13th century. Thus different variations evolved of the Russian language in the regions of Novgorod, Moscow, South Russia and meanwhile the Ukrainian language was also formed. Each of these languages preserves much of the Old East Slavic grammar and vocabulary. The Russian language in particular borrows more words from Church Slavonic than does Ukrainian.

However, findings by Russian linguist Andrey Zaliznyak suggest that, until the 14th or 15th century, major language differences were not between the regions occupied by modern Belarus, Russia and Ukraine, but rather between the north-west (around modern Novgorod and Pskov) and the center (around modern Kyiv, Suzdal, Rostov, Moscow as well as Belarus) of the East Slavic territories. The Old Novgorodian dialect of that time differed from the central East Slavic dialects as well as from all other Slavic languages much more than in later centuries. According to Zaliznyak, the Russian language developed as a convergence of that dialect and the central ones, whereas Ukrainian and Belarusian were a continuation of the development of the central dialects of the East Slavs.

Also, Russian linguist Sergey Nikolaev, analysing the historical development of the Slavic dialects' accent system, concluded that a number of other tribes in Kievan Rus' came from different Slavic branches and spoke distant Slavic dialects.

Another Russian linguist, G. A. Khaburgaev, and a number of Ukrainian linguists (Stepan Smal-Stotsky, Ivan Ohienko, George Shevelov, Yevhen Tymchenko, Vsevolod Hantsov, Olena Kurylo), deny the existence of a common Old East Slavic language at any time in the past. According to them, the dialects of East Slavic tribes evolved gradually from the common Proto-Slavic language without any intermediate stages.

Following the end of the "Tatar yoke", the territory of the former Kievan Rus' was divided between the Grand Duchy of Lithuania and the Grand Duchy of Moscow, and two separate literary traditions emerged in these states, Ruthenian in the west and medieval Russian in the east.

== Literary language ==
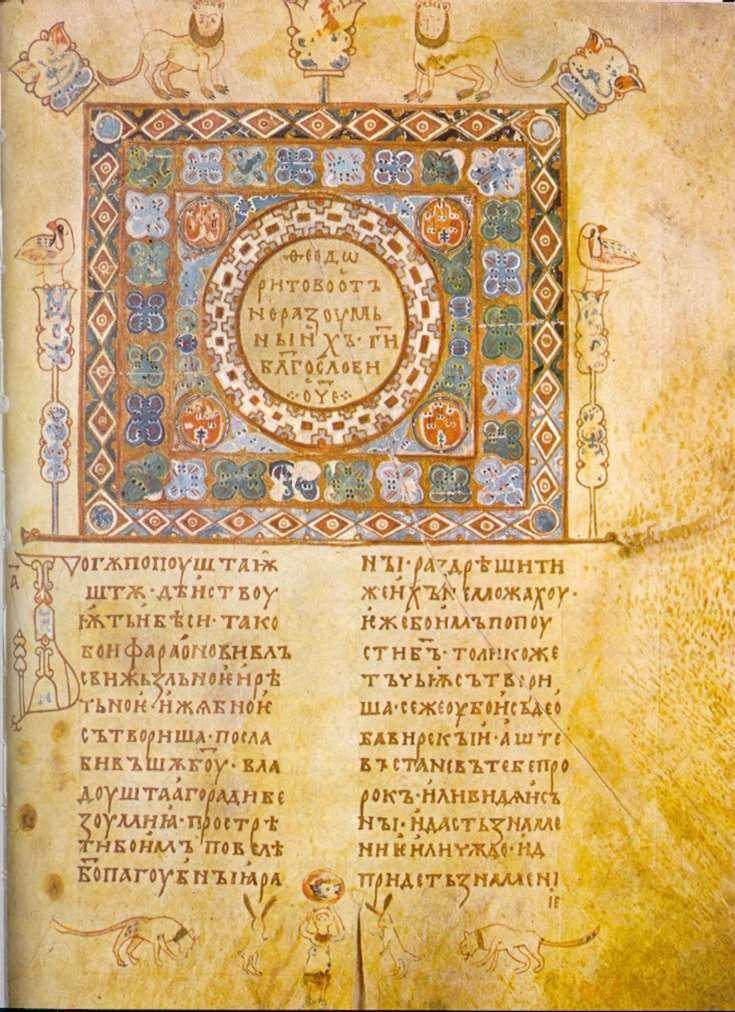
A page from Svyatoslav's Miscellanies (1073).

The political unification of the region into the state called Kievan Rus', from which modern Belarus, Russia and Ukraine trace their origins, occurred approximately a century before the adoption of Christianity in 988 and the establishment of the South Slavic Old Church Slavonic as the liturgical and literary language. Documentation of the Old East Slavic language of this period is scanty, making it difficult at best fully to determine the relationship between the literary language and its spoken dialects.

There are references in Byzantine sources to pre-Christian Slavs in Eastern Europe using some form of writing. Despite some suggestive archaeological finds and a corroboration by the tenth-century monk Chernorizets Hrabar that ancient Slavs wrote in "strokes and incisions", the exact nature of this system is unknown.

Although the Glagolitic alphabet was briefly introduced, as witnessed by church inscriptions in Novgorod, it was soon entirely superseded by Cyrillic. The samples of birch-bark writing excavated in Novgorod have provided crucial information about the pure tenth-century vernacular in vernacular in North-West Russia, almost entirely free of Church Slavonic influence. It is also known that borrowings and calques from Byzantine Greek began to enter the vernacular at this time, and that simultaneously the literary language in its turn began to be modified towards Eastern Slavic.

The following excerpts illustrate two of the most famous literary monuments.

NOTE: The spelling of the original excerpt has been partly modernized. The translations are best attempts at being literal, not literary.

=== Primary Chronicle ===
c. 1110, from the Laurentian Codex, 1377:

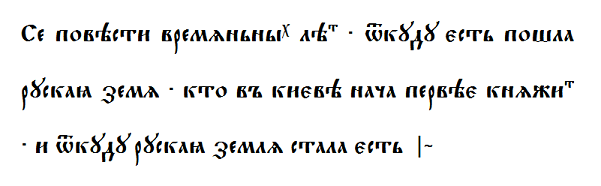

	Original	Transliteration
Old East Slavic	Се повѣсти времѧньны^{х} лѣ^{т} ‧ ѿкꙋдꙋ єсть пошла рꙋскаꙗ зем[л]ѧ ‧ кто въ києвѣ нача первѣє кнѧжи^{т} ‧ и ѿкꙋдꙋ рꙋскаꙗ землѧ стала єсть |~	Se pověsti vremęnĭnyx lět, otkudu estĭ pošla ruskaja zem[l]ę, kto vŭ kievě nača pervěe knęžit, i otkudu ruskaja zemlę stala estĭ.
Russian	Вот повести минувших лет, откуда пошла русская земля, кто в Киеве стал первым княжить, и как возникла русская земля.	Vot povesti minuvšix let, otkuda pošla russkaä zemlä, kto v Kijeve stal pervym knäžitj, i kak voznikla russkaä zemlä.
Ukrainian	Повість минулих літ Нестора, чорноризця Феодосієвого монастиря Печерського, звідки пішла Руська земля, і хто в ній почав спершу княжити, як Руська земля постала.	Povistj mynulyx lit Nestora, čornoryzcja Feodosijevoǧo monastyrja Pečersjkoǧo zvidky pišla Rusjka zemlia. i xto v nij počav speršu knjažyty, jak Rusjka zemlja postala.
Belarusian	Вось аповесці мінулых гадоў: адкуль пайшла руская зямля, хто ў Кіеве першым пачаў княжыць, і адкуль руская зямля паўстала.	Voś apoviesci minułych hadoŭ: adkul pajšła ruskaja ziamlia, chto ŭ Kijevie pieršym pačaŭ kniažyć, i adkul ruskaja ziamlia paŭstała.
English	These are the narratives of bygone years regarding the origin of the land of Rus', the first princes of Kiev, and from what source the land of Rus' had its beginning.	

In this usage example of the language, the fall of the yers is in progress or arguably complete: several words end with a consonant, e.g. кнѧжит, knęžit "to rule" < кънѧжити, kŭnęžiti (modern Uk княжити, knjažyty, R княжить, knjažit', B княжыць, knjažyc'). South Slavic features include времѧньнъıх, vremęnĭnyx "bygone" (modern R минувших, minuvšix, Uk минулих, mynulyx, B мінулых, minulyx). Correct use of perfect and aorist: єсть пошла, estĭ pošla "is/has come" (modern B пайшла, pajšla, R пошла, pošla, Uk пішла, pišla), нача, nača "began" (modern Uk почав, počav, B пачаў, pačaŭ, R начал, načal) as a development of the old perfect. Note the style of punctuation.

=== The Tale of Igor's Campaign ===
Слово о пълку Игоревѣ. c. 1200, from the Pskov manuscript, fifteenth cent.

	Original	Transliteration
Old East Slavic	Не лѣпо ли ны бяшетъ братїє, начяти старыми словесы трудныхъ повѣстїй о пълку Игоревѣ, Игоря Святъславлича? Начати же ся тъй пѣсни по былинамъ сего времени, а не по замышленїю Бояню. Боянъ бо вѣщїй, аще кому хотяше пѣснь творити, то растѣкашется мыслію по древу, сѣрымъ вълкомъ по земли, шизымъ орломъ подъ облакы.	Ne lěpo li ny bjašetŭ bratije, načjati starymi slovesy trudnyxŭ pověstij o pŭlku Igorevě, Igorja Svjatŭslaviča? Načati že sja tŭj pěsni po bylinamŭ sego vremeni, a ne po zamyšleniju Bojanju. Bojanŭ bo věščij, ašče komu xotjaše pěsnĭ tvoriti, to rastěkašetsja mysliju po drevu, sěrymŭ vŭlkomŭ po zemli, šizymŭ orlomŭ podŭ oblaky.
English	Would it not be meet, o brothers, for us to begin with the old words the martial telling of the host of Igor, of Igor Sviatoslavlich? And to begin this tale in the way of the true tales of this time, and not in the way of Bojan's inventions. For the wise Bojan, if he wished to devote to someone [his] song, would fly like a squirrel in the trees, like a grey wolf over land, like a bluish eagle beneath the clouds.	

Illustrates the sung epics, with typical use of metaphor and simile.

It has been suggested that the phrase растекаться мыслью по древу (rastekat'sja mysl'ju po drevu, to run in thought upon/over wood), which has become proverbial in modern Russian with the meaning "to speak ornately, at length, excessively," is a misreading of an original мысію, mysiju (akin to мышь "mouse") from "run like a squirrel/mouse on a tree"; however, the reading мыслью, myslĭju is present in both the manuscript copy of 1790 and the first edition of 1800, and in all subsequent scholarly editions.

== Old East Slavic literature ==
The Old East Slavic language developed a certain literature of its own, though much of it (along with that of other early written Slavic languages) was influenced as regards style and vocabulary by religious texts written in Church Slavonic. Surviving literary monuments include the legal code Russkaya Pravda, a corpus of hagiography and homily, The Tale of Igor's Campaign, and the earliest surviving manuscript of the Primary Chronicle – the Laurentian Codex of 1377.

The earliest dated specimen of Old East Slavic (or, rather, of Church Slavonic with pronounced East Slavic interference) must be considered the written Sermon on Law and Grace by Hilarion, metropolitan of Kiev. In this work there is a panegyric on Prince Vladimir of Kiev, the hero of so much of East Slavic popular poetry. It is rivalled by another panegyric on Vladimir, written a decade later by Yakov the Monk.

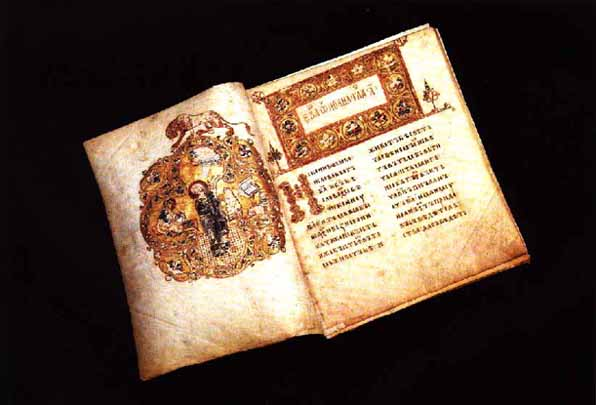
Ostromir Gospels from Novgorod, dating to 1056 or 1057

Other 11th-century writers are Theodosius, a monk of the Kiev Pechersk Lavra, who wrote on the Latin faith and some Pouchenia or Instructions, and Luka Zhidiata, bishop of Novgorod, who has left a curious Discourse to the Brethren. From the writings of Theodosius we see that many pagan habits were still in vogue among the people. He finds fault with them for allowing these to continue, and also for their drunkenness; nor do the monks escape his censures. Zhidiata writes in a more vernacular style than many of his contemporaries; he eschews the declamatory tone of the Byzantine authors. And here may be mentioned the many lives of the saints and the Fathers to be found in early East Slavic literature, starting with the two Lives of Sts Boris and Gleb, written in the late eleventh century and attributed to Jacob the Monk and to Nestor the Chronicler.

With the so-called Primary Chronicle, also attributed to Nestor, begins the long series of the Russian annalists. There is a regular catena of these chronicles, extending with only two breaks to the seventeenth century. Besides the work attributed to Nestor the Chronicler, there are the chronicles of Novgorod, Kiev, Volhynia and many others. Every town of any importance could boast of its annalists, Pskov and Suzdal among others.

In the 12th century, we have the sermons of Bishop Cyril of Turov, which are attempts to imitate in Old East Slavic the florid Byzantine style. In his sermon on Holy Week, Christianity is represented under the form of spring, Paganism and Judaism under that of winter, and evil thoughts are spoken of as boisterous winds.

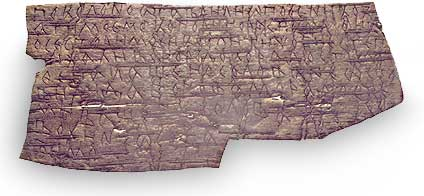
Literate 14th-century Novgorodians sent each other letters written on birch bark

There are also the works of early travellers, as the igumen Daniel, who visited the Holy Land at the end of the eleventh and beginning of the twelfth century. A later traveller was Afanasiy Nikitin, a merchant of Tver, who visited India in 1470. He has left a record of his adventures, which has been translated into English and published for the Hakluyt Society.

A curious monument of old Slavonic times is the Pouchenie (“Instruction”), written by Vladimir Monomakh for the benefit of his sons. This composition is generally found inserted in the Chronicle of Nestor; it gives a fine picture of the daily life of a Slavonic prince. The Paterik of the Kievan Caves Monastery is a typical medieval collection of stories from the life of monks, featuring devils, angels, ghosts, and miraculous resurrections.

Lay of Igor's Campaign narrates the expedition of Igor Svyatoslavich, the prince of Novgorod-Seversk, against the Cumans. It is neither epic nor a poem but is written in rhythmic prose. An interesting aspect of the text is its mix of Christianity and ancient Slavic religion. Igor's wife Yaroslavna famously invokes natural forces from the walls of Putyvl. Christian motifs are present along with depersonalised pagan gods in the form of artistic images. Another aspect, which sets the book apart from contemporary Western epics, is its numerous and vivid descriptions of nature, and the role which nature plays in human lives. Of the whole bulk of the Old East Slavic literature, the Lay is the only work familiar to almost every educated East Slav (Belarusian, Russian, or Ukrainian). Its brooding flow of images, murky metaphors, and ever-changing rhythm have not been successfully rendered into English yet. Indeed, the meanings of many words found in it have not been satisfactorily explained by scholars.

The Zadonshchina is a sort of prose poem much in the style of The Tale of Igor's Campaign, and the resemblance of the latter to this piece furnishes an additional proof of its genuineness. This account of the Battle of Kulikovo, which was gained by Dmitry Donskoy over the Mongols in 1380, has come down in three important versions.

The early laws of Rus' present many features of interest, such as the Russkaya Pravda of Yaroslav the Wise, which is preserved in the chronicle of Novgorod; the date is between 1018 and 1072.

== Study ==
The earliest attempts to compile a comprehensive lexicon of Old East Slavic were undertaken by Alexander Vostokov and Izmail Sreznevsky in the nineteenth century. Sreznevsky's Materials for the Dictionary of the Old Russian Language on the Basis of Written Records (1893–1903), though incomplete, remained a standard reference until the appearance of a 24-volume academic dictionary in 1975–99.

== Notable texts ==
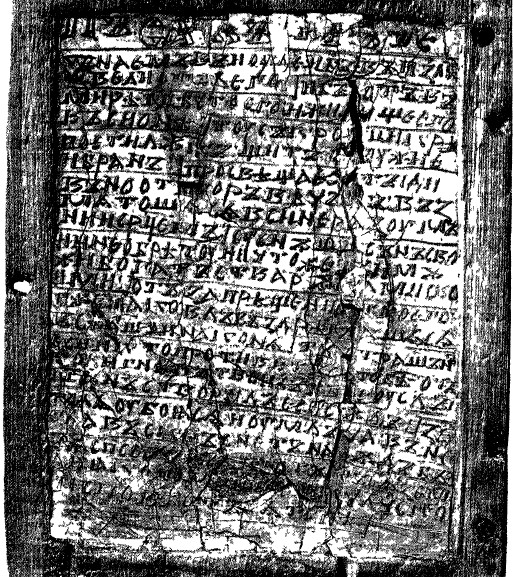
First page of the tenth-century Novgorod Codex, thought to be the oldest East Slavic book in existence

- Bylinas
- The Tale of Igor's Campaign – the most outstanding literary work in this language
- Russkaya Pravda – an eleventh-century legal code issued by Yaroslav the Wise
- Praying of Daniel the Immured
- A Journey Beyond the Three Seas

== See also ==
- Old Russians
- Outline of Slavic history and culture
- List of Slavic studies journals
- History of the East Slavic languages
- List of Latvian words borrowed from Old East Slavic

== Bibliography ==
- "Povest' vremennykh let" Повесть временных лет [Primary Chronicle]. Institute of Russian Literature (Pushkin House) of the Russian Academy of Sciences (in Russian).
- "Old Russian". Encyclopædia Britannica.
- Chauhan, Yamini (25 May 2012). "Grand Principality of Moscow | medieval principality, Russia". Encyclopædia Britannica.
- Karotki, Uladzimir (2004). Staražytnaja litaratura uschodnich slavian XI – XIII stahoddziaŭ Старажытная літаратура ўсходніх славян ХІ – ХІІІ стагоддзяў [Old Literature of the East Slavs in the 11th–13th Centuries] (PDF) (in Belarusian). Translated by Karotki, Uladzimir; Nekrashevich-Karotkaya, Zhanna; Kayala, U. I. Grodno: GrSU.
- Chisholm, Hugh, ed. (1911). "Slavonic, Old" . Encyclopædia Britannica. Vol. 25 (11th ed.). Cambridge University Press. pp. 227–228.
- Cross, Samuel Hazzard; Sherbowitz-Wetzor, Olgerd P. (2012) [1953]. The Russian Primary chronicle: Laurentian Text. Cambridge, MA: Mediaeval Academy of America. ISBN 978-0-915651-32-0.
- Derksen, Rick (2008). Etymological Dictionary of the Slavic Inherited Lexicon. Leiden-Boston: Koninklijke Brill NV. ISBN 978-90-04-15504-6. ISSN 1574-3586.
- Dybo, V. A.; Zamyatina, G. I.; Nikolaev, S. L. (1990). Bulatova, R.V. (ed.). Osnovy slavyanskoy aktsentologii Основы славянской акцентологии [Fundamentals of Slavic Accentology] (in Russian). Moscow: Nauka. ISBN 5-02-011011-6.
- Getka, Joanna, Moisiienko, Viktor, Na początku było Słowo… Od standardu mówionego do normy literackiej (Zarys genezy ukraińskiego języka literackiego) // Йоанна Ґетка, Віктор Мойсієнко, Спочатку було Слово... Від мовного узусу – до літературної норми (Нарис генези української літературної мови). Wydawnictwa Uniwersytetu Warszawskiego, 2024, ISBN 978-83-235-6700-4, ISBN 978-83-235-6701-1 (pdf online)
- Getka, Joanna, Moisiienko, Viktor, Origins of the Ukrainian literary language in the context of the polish hypothesis on genesis polish literary language „Українська полоністика”, 17/2020 DOI: https://doi.org/10.35433/2220-4555.17.2020.fil-4
- "Slovo o polku Ihorevim" СЛОВО О ПЛЪКУ ИГОРЕВЂ. Слово о полку Ігоревім. Слово о полку Игореве [The Tale of Igor's Campaign]. Izbornyk (in Ukrainian).
- "Letopis' po Lavrent'evskomu spisku" Лѣтопись по Лаврентьевскому списку [Laurentian Codex]. Izbornyk (in Russian).
- Khaburgaev, Georgiy Alexandrovich (2005). "Drenverusskiy Yazyk" Древнерусский язык [Old Russian]. In Moldovan, A. M.; Skorvid, S. S.; Kibrik, A. A.; Rogova, N. V.; Yakushkina, E. I.; Zhuravlev, A. F.; Tolstaya, S. M. (eds.). Yazyki mira. Slavyanskie Yazyki Языки мира. Славянские языки [Languages of the World. Slavic Languages] (in Russian). Moscow: Academia. pp. 418–437.
- Krause, Todd B.; Slocum, Jonathan (2013). "Old Russian Online, Series Introduction". Early Indo-European Online Language Lessons. University of Texas at Austin.
- Langston, Keith (2018). "The documentation of Slavic". In Jared Klein; Brian Joseph; Matthias Fritz (eds.). Handbook of Comparative and Historical Indo-European Linguistics. Walter de Gruyter GmbH & Co KG. pp. 1397–1413. ISBN 978-3-11-054243-1.
- Lotha, Gloria; Kuiper, Kathleen; Mahajan, Deepti; Shukla, Gaurav (13 September 2022). "Ukrainian Language". Encyclopædia Britannica.
- "Povist' minulikh lit" Повість минулих літ [Primary Chronicle]. The Library of Ukrainian Literature (in Ukrainian).
- Lunt, Horace G. (2001). Old Church Slavonic Grammar (seventh ed.). Berlin: Mouton De Gruyter. p. 184. ISBN 3-11-016284-9.
- Magocsi, Paul Robert (2010). A history of Ukraine: the land and its peoples (2nd ed.). Toronto: University of Toronto press. ISBN 978-1-4426-4085-6.
- Minns, Ellis Hovell (1911). "Slavs" . In Chisholm, Hugh (ed.). Encyclopædia Britannica. Vol. 25 (11th ed.). Cambridge University Press. pp. 228–237.
- "Laurentian Codex. 1377". The National Library of Russia.
- Nimchuk, V. V. (2001). "9.1. Mova" 9.1. Мова [9.1. The Language]. In Smoliy, V. A. (ed.). Istoriia ukrains'koi kultury Історія української культури [A History of the Ukrainian Culture] (in Ukrainian). Vol. 1. Kyiv: Naukova Dumka.
- Ostrowski, Donald (2018). Portraits of Medieval Eastern Europe, 900–1400. Christian Raffensperger. Abingdon, Oxon: Routledge. ISBN 978-1-315-20417-8. OCLC 994543451.
- "Laurentian Codex". Russian State Library.
- Schenker, Alexander M. (1995). The Dawn of Slavic: An Introduction to Slavic Philology. New Haven / London: Yale University Press. ISBN 0-300-05846-2.
- Schmalstieg, William R. (1995). "An introduction to Old Russian". Journal of Indo-European Studies Monograph Series (15). Washington, D.C.: Institute for the Study of Man. ISBN 0-941694-37-2.
- Shevelov, George Yurii (1984). "Common Russian". Internet Encyclopedia of Ukraine.
- Shevelev, George Yury Yurii (1979). A Historical Phonology of the Ukrainian Language. Historical Phonology of the Slavic Languages. Heidelberg: Universitätsverlag C. Winter. ISBN 3-533-02786-4. OL 22276820M. Wikidata Q105081119.
- Shevelov, George Yurii (1963). "History of the Ukrainian Language". In Kubijovyč, Volodymyr (ed.). Ukraine: A Concise Encyclopaedia. Vol. I. University of Toronto Press. LCCN 63023686.
- Shevelov, George Yurii (1979). Istorychna fonologiia ukrains'koi movy Історична фонологія української мови [A Historical Phonology of the Ukrainian Language] (in Ukrainian). Translated by Vakulenko, Serhiy; Danilenko, Andriy. Kharkiv: Acta.
- "639 Identifier Documentation: orv". SIL International (formerly known as the Summer Institute of Linguistics). 2022.
- Simone, Lucas Ricardo (2018). "Uma breve introdução ao idioma eslavo oriental antigo" [A Brief Introduction to the Old East Slavic Language]. Slovo – Revista de Estudos em Eslavística (in Portuguese). 1 (1): 14–39.
- Vinokur, G. O. (1971). Forsyth, James (ed.). The Russian Language: A Brief History. Translated by Forsyth, Mary A. Cambridge: Cambridge University. ISBN 0-521-07944-6.
- Yartseva, V. N.; Arutyunova, N. D. (1990). Lingvisticheskiĭ ėnt︠s︡iklopedicheskiĭ slovarʹ Лингвистический энциклопедический словарь [Linguistic Encyclopedic Dictionary] (in Russian). I︠A︡rt︠s︡eva, V. N. (Viktorii︠a︡ Nikolaevna), 1906–1999., Aruti︠u︡nova, N. D. (Nina Davidovna), Izdatelʹstvo "Sovetskai︠a︡ ėnt︠s︡iklopedii︠a︡." Nauchno-redakt︠s︡ionnyĭ sovet., Institut i︠a︡zykoznanii︠a︡ (Akademii︠a︡ nauk SSSR). Moscow: Sov. ėnt︠s︡iklopedii︠a︡. p. 143. ISBN 5-85270-031-2. OCLC 23704551.
- Zaliznyak, Andrey Anatolyevich (2012). "Ob istorii russkogo yazyka" Об истории русского языка [About Russian Language History]. Elementy (in Russian). Mumi-Troll School.
- Pugh, Stefan M. (1985). "The Ruthenian Language of Meletij Smotryc'kyj: Phonology". Harvard Ukrainian Studies. 9 (1/2): 53–60. JSTOR 41036132.
- Bermel, Neil (1 January 1997). Context and the Lexicon in the Development of Russian Aspect. University of California Press. ISBN 978-0-520-09812-1.
- Fortson, Benjamin W. (7 September 2011). Indo-European Language and Culture: An Introduction. John Wiley & Sons. ISBN 978-1-4443-5968-8.
- Pugh, Stefan M. (1996). Testament to Ruthenian: A Linguistic Analysis of the Smotryc'kyj Variant. Cambridge, Mass.: Harvard University Press. ISBN 978-0-916458-75-1.
- Matthews, W. K. (2013). The structure and development of Russian (First paperback ed.). Cambridge: Cambridge University Press. ISBN 978-1-107-61939-5.
