= Christianization of Kievan Rus' =

Conversion of Slavic state to Christianity

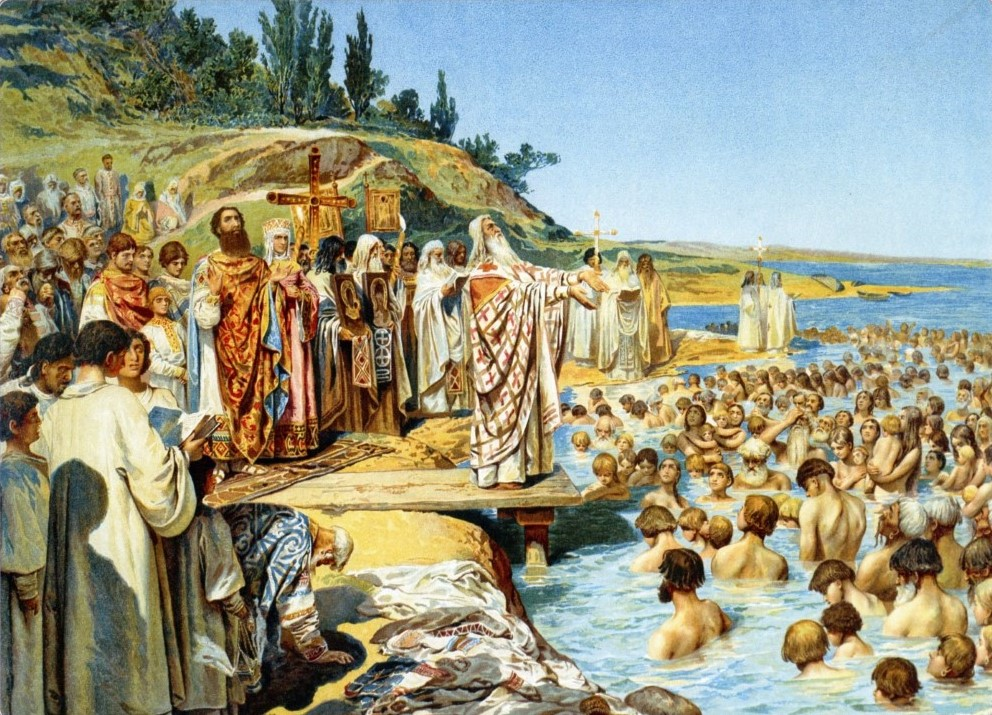
The Baptism of Rus' (Klavdiy Lebedev c. 1900)

The Christianization of Kievan Rus' was a long and complicated process that took place in several stages. In 867, Patriarch Photius of Constantinople told other Christian patriarchs that the Rus' people were converting enthusiastically, but his efforts seem to have entailed no lasting consequences, since the Russian Primary Chronicle and other Slavonic sources describe the tenth-century Rus' as still firmly entrenched in Slavic paganism. The traditional view, as recorded in the Russian Primary Chronicle, is that the definitive Christianization of Kievan Rus' dates happened c. 988 (the year is disputed), when Vladimir the Great was baptized in Chersonesus (Korsun) and proceeded to baptize his family and people in Kiev. The latter events are traditionally referred to as baptism of Rus' (Russian: Крещение Руси, romanized: Kreshcheniye Rusi; Ukrainian: Хрещення Русі, romanized: Khreshchennia Rusi; Belarusian: Вадохрышча Русі, romanized: Vadokhryshcha Rusi) in Russian, Ukrainian and Belarusian literature.

== Antiquity ==
=== Early presence ===
Although sometimes solely attributed to Vladimir/Volodymyr, the Christianization of Kievan Rus' was a long and complicated process that began before the state's formation. As early as the 1st century AD, Greeks in the Black Sea Colonies converted to Christianity, although most of these lands never became part of Kievan Rus'.

The Goths migrated to through the region in the 3rd century, adopting Arian Christianity in the 4th century, leaving behind 4th- and 5th-century churches excavated in Crimea (which was outside of Kievan control, except for Tmutarakan), although the Hunnic invasion of the 370s halted Christianisation for several centuries.

=== Apostolic legends ===
The Primary Chronicle (pages 7.21–9.4) records the legend of Andrew the Apostle's mission to these coastal settlements, as well as blessing the site of present-day Kyiv. Andrew supposedly travelled from Sinope towards Chersonesus (Korsun) in Crimea, up the river Dnipro, and reached the future location of Kyiv, where he erected a cross. Next, he is said to have journeyed north to the Slovenes near the future site of Veliky Novgorod, although he had a negative attitude towards their customs (particularly their washing in a hot steam bath, banya); then he visited Rome and returned to Sinope. In a later passage of the Primary Chronicle under the year 6404 (898; page 28), claims are made about how a certain Andronicus, a purported disciple of Paul the Apostle, was the "Apostle of the Slavs", due to his preaching amongst the "Moravians" in "Illyricum", with the "Rus'" supposedly descended from the "Slavs"; this contradicts claims made elsewhere in the same Primary Chronicle.

For one, the chronicle says explicitly sub anno 6491 (983): 'the Apostles were not by body here'; (Note: 'Аще бо и тѣлъмь апостоли суть не были' (PVL 83.20–21).) 'the apostles did not teach here; and also the prophets did not prophecy here'. (Note: 'сьде бо не суть учили апостоли, ни пророци прорекли.' (PVL 83.15–16).) Secondly, the legend of Andrew travelling through Scythia dates from the 3rd or 4th century, and it was not until the 9th century that the monk Epiphanius wrote a vita in Greek about Andrew that mentions the cities of Sinope and Kherson for the first time. Moreover, the external evidence suggests nobody was aware of the legend of Andrew blessing the future site of Kyiv until the late 11th century, and the internal evidence suggests that the trip to the would-be Novgorod Slavs was the first interpolation – as Andrew tells people about it in Rome, but says nothing about erecting a cross and blessing the future site of Kyiv. Therefore, the latter would have been a secondary interpolation that was only formulated later in order to claim an apostolic origin for Kyiv.

== Ninth century ==
Some of the earliest Kievan princes and princesses such as Askold and Dir and Olga of Kiev reportedly converted to Christianity, but Oleg the Wise, Igor of Kiev and Sviatoslav I remained pagans. According to some sources and historians, there was an attempt in the 9th century to Christianise Kievan Rus'. The most authoritative source for this purported first conversion attempt is an encyclical letter of Patriarch Photius of Constantinople, datable to early 867. Referencing the Rus'-Byzantine War of 860, Photius informs the Oriental patriarchs and bishops that, after the Bulgarians turned to Christ in 864, the Rus' followed suit so zealously that he found it prudent to send to their land a bishop.

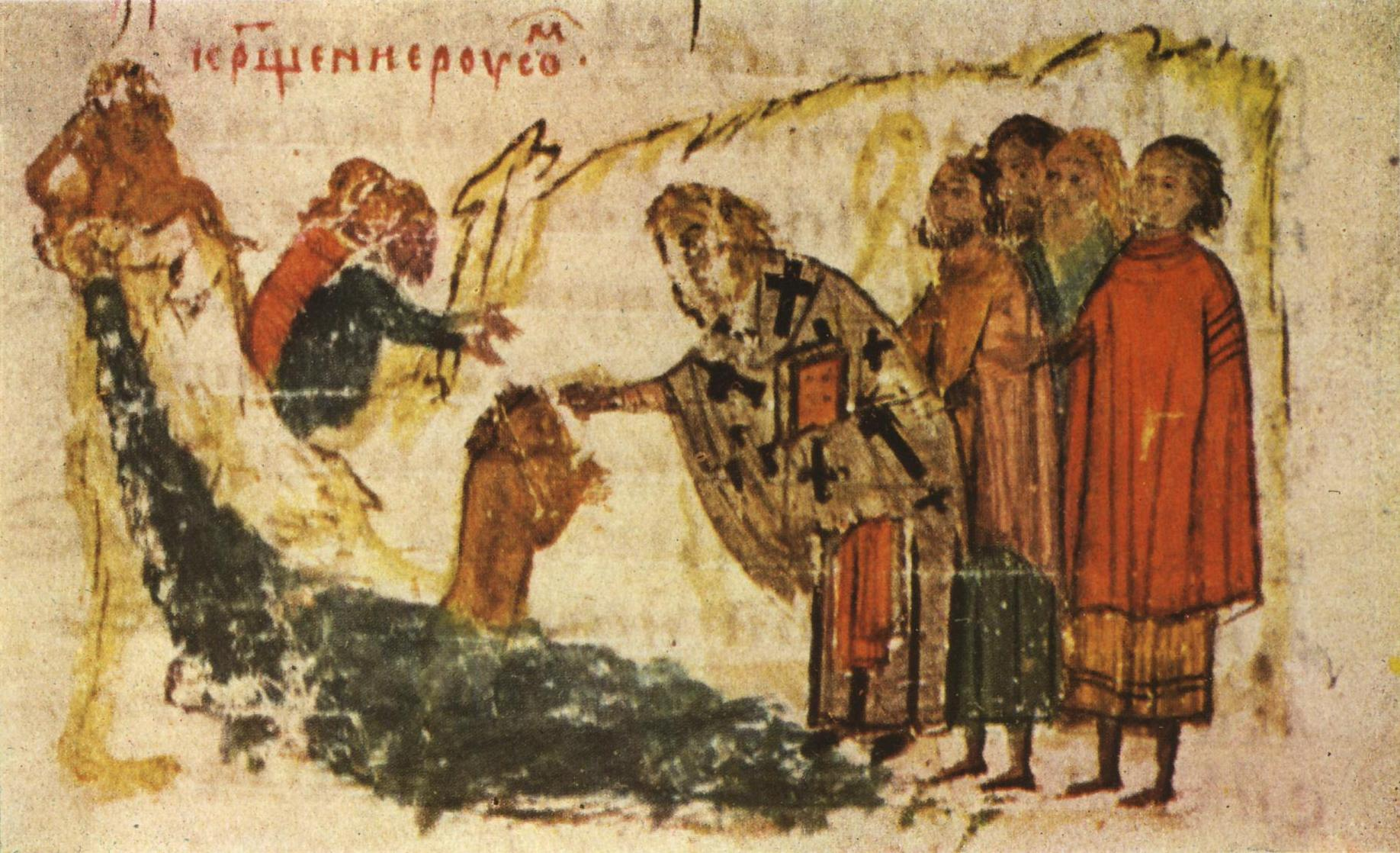
Baptism of the first Rus, illustrated in the 14th century Manasses Chronicle.

Byzantine historians, starting with the continuation of Theophanes the Confessor, assumed that the Rus' raid against Constantinople in 860 was a Byzantine success and attributed the presumed victory to the Intercession of the Theotokos. This conviction dictated the following interpretation: awed by the miracles they witnessed under the walls of the imperial capital and grief-stricken at the disaster that befell them, the Rus' sent envoys to Photius and asked him to send a bishop to their land.

According to Constantine VII, who authored a biography of his grandfather, Basil the Macedonian, it was his ancestor who persuaded the Rus' to abandon their pagan ways. Constantine attributes the conversion to Basil and to Patriarch Ignatius, rather than to their predecessors, Michael III and Photius. He narrates how the Byzantines galvanized the Rus' into conversion by their persuasive words and rich presents, including gold, silver, and precious tissues. He also repeats a traditional story that the pagans were particularly impressed by a miracle: a gospel book thrown by the archbishop (sic) into an oven was not damaged by fire.

Constantine's account precipitated a long-term dispute over whether the 9th-century Christianization of the Rus' went through two stages. One school of thought postulates that there was only one Christianization: wishing to glorify his ancestor, Constantine simply ascribed to Basil the missionary triumphs of his predecessor, Michael III.

On the other hand, Constantine Zuckerman argues that, in response to the initial request of the Rus', Photius (and Michael III) sent to the Rus' Khaganate a simple bishop. The pagans felt slighted at the low rank of the prelate and their Christian zeal evaporated. In September 867, Michael was assassinated by Basil, who (together with a new patriarch, Ignatius) sent to the Rus' an archbishop who propped up the religious fervor of the local leaders with rich presents. Parenthetically, the contemporaneous Christianization of Bulgaria was likewise effected in two stages: the Bulgars were offended when a simple bishop arrived to their capital from Constantinople and requested Pope Nicholas I to send them a higher-ranking church official. Such considerations were an important matter of political prestige. This pattern has parallels with the stories of Frankish historians about the multiple "baptisms" of the Norsemen, whose true intention was to get hold of the rich gifts accompanying the Christianization rituals.

The date and rationale for the Christianization are also shrouded in controversy. Grigory Litavrin views the event as "a formal and diplomatic act making it easier to obtain advantageous agreements with the ruler of the Christian state." Zuckerman argues that Ignatius sent his archbishop to Rus' in about 870, while Dmitry Obolensky inclines to accept 874 as the date of the definitive Christianization.

== Tenth century ==
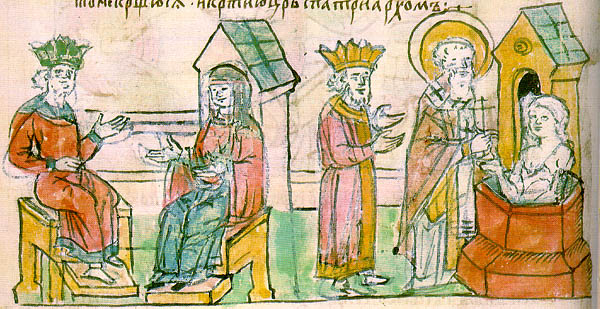
The baptism of St. Princess Olga in Constantinople, a miniature from the Radziwiłł Chronicle

Whatever the scope of Photius's efforts to Christianize the Rus', their effect was not lasting. Although they fail to mention the mission of Photius, the authors of the Primary Chronicle were aware that a sizable portion of the Kievan population was Christian by 944. From the times of Askold's rule, Christianity had spread among members of the princes' druzhina, as well as the merchant class. In the Rus'-Byzantine Treaty, preserved in the text of the chronicle, the Christian part of the Rus' swear according to their faith, while the ruling prince and other non-Christians invoke Perun and Veles after the pagan custom. In the late 9th century a church in honour of Saint Nicholas was erected on Askold's Grave in Kyiv, and by the end of the following half century a church dedicated to Saint Elijah had been founded in the city. The collegiate church of St. Elijah (whose cult in the Slavic countries was closely modeled on that of Perun) is mentioned in the text of the chronicle, leaving modern scholars to ponder how many churches existed in Kiev at the time.

Either in 945 or 957, the ruling regent, Olga of Kiev, visited Constantinople with a certain priest, Gregory. Her reception at the imperial court is described in De Ceremoniis. According to legends, Byzantine Emperor Constantine VII fell in love with Olga; however, she found a way to refuse him by tricking him into becoming her godfather. When she was baptized, she said it was inappropriate for a godfather to marry his goddaughter.

Although it is usually presumed that Olga was baptized in Constantinople rather than Kiev, there is no explicit mention of the sacrament, so neither version is excluded. Olga is also known to have requested a bishop and priests from Rome. In 959 Olga appealed to the Holy Roman Emperor, asking him to appoint a bishop and priests for her realm. However, Adalbert of Trier, who entered Rus' with a mission in 962, failed in his task and was forced to flee the country. Adalbert himself later blamed Olga of being dishonest in her claim to support Christianization.

Olga's son, Sviatoslav (r. 963–972), continued to worship Perun and other gods of the Slavic pantheon. He remained a stubborn pagan all of his life; according to the Primary Chronicle, he believed that his warriors would lose respect for him and mock him if he became a Christian. Under Sviatoslav's rule an anti-Christian campaign led to the destruction of Kyiv's churches.

Sviatoslav's successor, Yaropolk I (r. 972–980), seems to have had a more conciliatory attitude towards Christianity. Late medieval sources even claim that Yaropolk exchanged ambassadors with the Pope. The Chronicon of Adémar de Chabannes and the life of St. Romuald (by Pietro Damiani) actually document the mission of St. Bruno of Querfurt to the land of Rus', where he succeeded in converting to Christianity a local king (one of three brothers who ruled the land). Alexander Nazarenko suggests that Yaropolk went through some preliminary rites of baptism, but was murdered at the behest of his pagan half-brother Vladimir (whose own rights to the throne were questionable) before his conversion was formalized. Following this theory, any information on Yaropolk's baptism according to the Latin form would have been suppressed by the later Eastern Orthodox chroniclers, zealous to keep Vladimir's image of the Rus Apostle untarnished for succeeding generations.

Immediately after taking the throne in Kyiv in 980, Vladimir, who during that time supported anti-Christian attitudes, ordered the erection of a pagan pantheon consisting of six Slavic deities near his princely residence. The pantheon stood on the location for eight years, signifying the last wave of paganism in Rus'.

== Conversion of Vladimir ==
The Conversion of Vladimir is a narrative recorded in several different versions in medieval sources about how Vladimir the Great converted from Slavic paganism to Byzantine Christianity in the 980s.

In traditional historiography, it is known as the Baptism of Volodimer, (Note: Old Church Slavonic: Крьщєниѥ Володимѣра, romanized: Krĭštenijĕ Volodiměra; Belarusian: Хрышчэнне Уладзіміра, romanized: Khryshchennye Uladzimira; Russian: Крещение Владимира, romanized: Kreshchenie Vladimira; Ukrainian: Хрещення Володимира, romanized: Khreshchennia Volodymyra.) and regarded as the highlight of the Christianization of Kievan Rus' (dubbed the Baptism of Rus').

What virtually all accounts agree on is that Volodimer's baptism happened around the same time as two other events: Volodimer's marriage to Byzantine princess Anna Porphyrogenita, sister of co-emperors Basil II and Constantine VIII, and Volodimer's siege and capture of a Byzantine city in the Crimean peninsula called Chersonesus (Medieval Greek: Χερσών, romanized: Chersōn; Church Slavonic: Кърсунь/корсоунь, romanized: Kŭrsunĭ/Korsun', modern Ukrainian and Russian: Херсон(ес) Kherson(es) (Note: Not to be confused with the present-day city of Kherson, named after it, and founded in 1778 (since 1803 capital of the Kherson Governorate), in present-day mainland Ukraine.)). What they disagree on is how these three events were related, in which sequence they happened, and why. The entire conversion story covers a large chunk of the Primary Chronicle (PVL): pages 84–121, or 37 out of a total of 286 pages (12.9%) of the entire text.

The conversion, while having strategic importance, likely had its immediate roots in the dynastic relationships between Rus' and the Byzantine Empire. In 987 Bardas Phokas proclaimed himself emperor and rose up against Basil II, leading the latter to send an appeal for support to Kyiv. Vladimir agreed to support the legitimate emperor with his military, but demanded to be allowed to marry the emperor's sister Anne in exchange. Eventually, according to the historian Alex M. Feldman, an agreement was reached, according to which the prince would marry the princess on the condition that he would capture the Crimean city of Chersonesus on behalf of his new brother-in-law, which had ostensibly joined the Phokas rebellion, and that he and the whole of his people would convert to Christianity.

== Baptism of Kiev ==
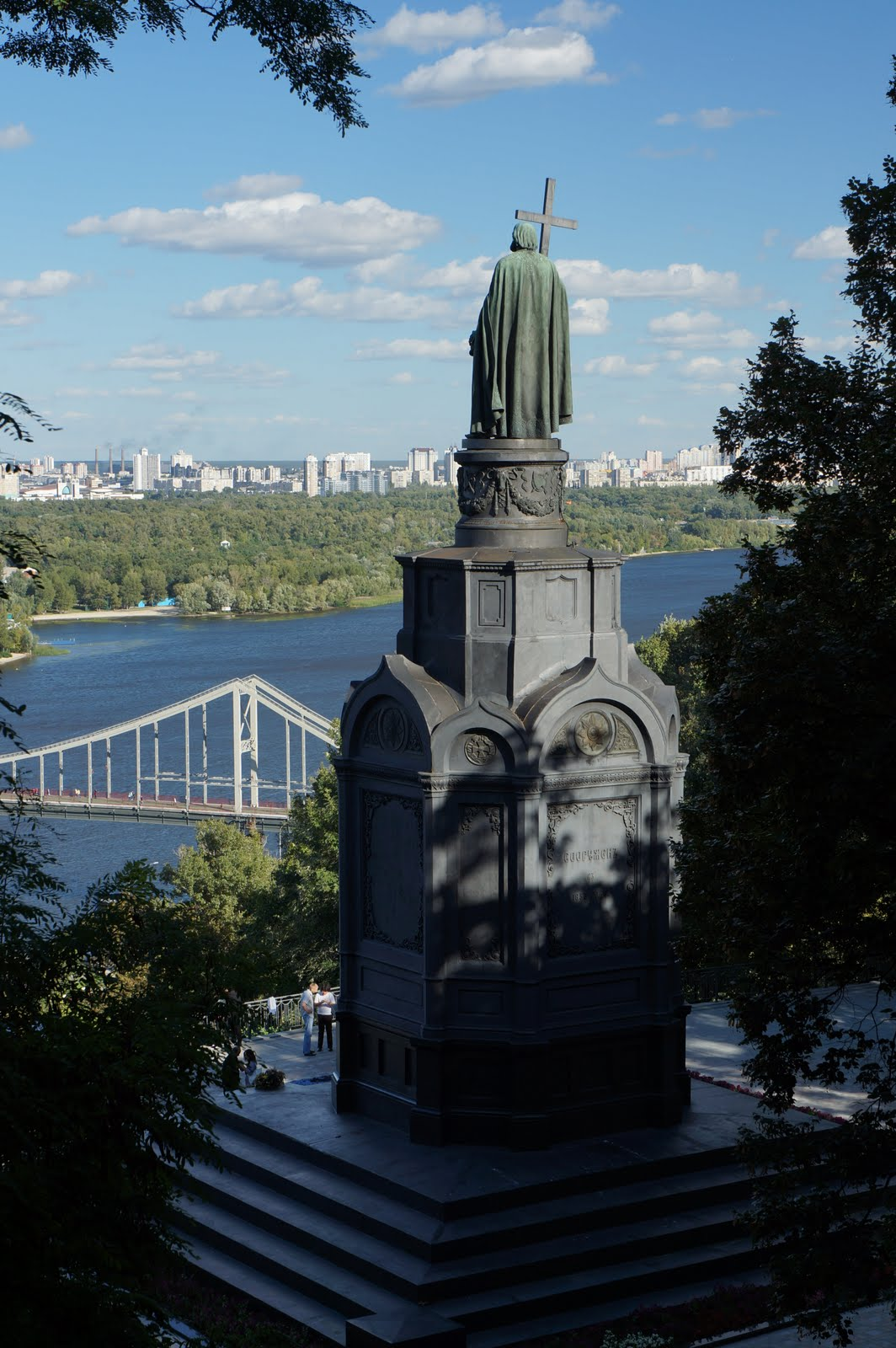
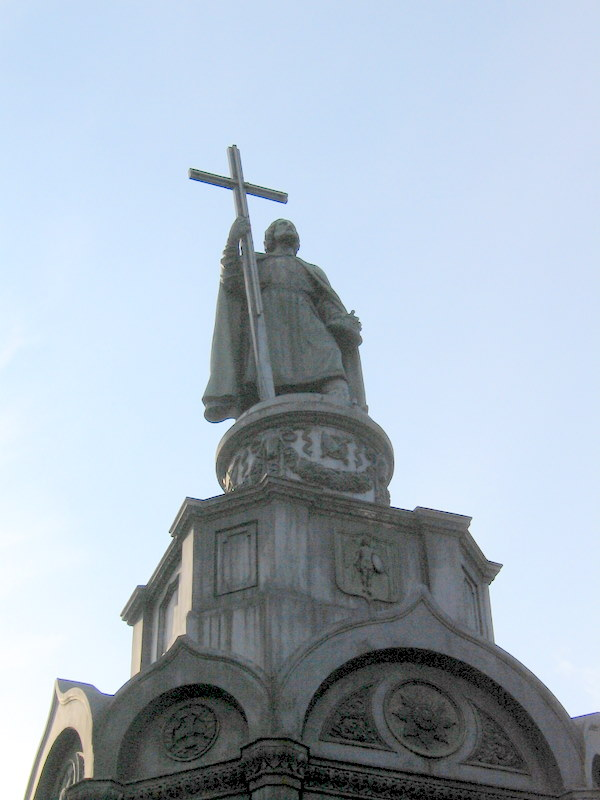
Monument to Prince Vladimir erected on Volodymyrska Hill in Kiev near the place of the mass baptism of Kiev people

In spring of 988 the Rus' army united with the emperor's military and defeated Phokas. However, the emperor was reluctant to allow Vladimir's marriage to Anne, so Vladimir turned against Chersonesus, with his men taking and pillaging the city and sending a signal that the same fate could await Constantinople. This threat forced Basil II to concede. Together with his new bride, Vladimir left to Kyiv, where he ordered all the pagan idols to be removed and destroyed, and the city's inhabitants underwent mass baptism in the Dnieper.

At first, Vladimir baptized his twelve sons and many boyars. He destroyed the wooden statues of Slavic pagan gods (which he had himself raised just eight years earlier). They were either burnt or hacked into pieces, and the statue of Perun — the supreme god — was thrown into the Dnieper.

Then Vladimir sent a message to all residents of Kiev, "rich, and poor, and beggars, and slaves", to come to the river on the following day, lest they risk becoming the "prince's enemies". Large numbers of people came; some even brought infants with them. They were sent into the water while priests, who came from Chersonesos for the occasion, prayed.

To commemorate the event, Vladimir built the first stone church of Kievan Rus', called the Church of the Tithes, where his body and the body of his new wife were to repose. Another church was built on top of the hill where pagan statues stood before. Though the site of this second church is not certain, it is usually identified with the site of the later Three Saints Church, which was itself demolished by the Soviet government starting in 1935 to make way for the Council of People's Commissars.

== Aftermath ==
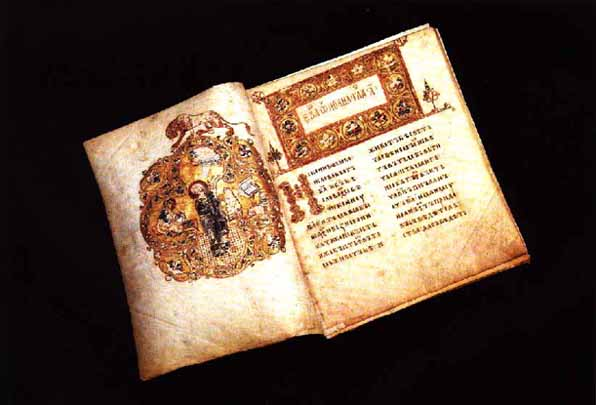
The Ostromir Gospels, written in Church Slavonic, one of the first dated East Slavic books.

In other locations of Rus' the process of Christinization met with serious difficulties: in Novgorod the locals could be baptized only in 989 after fierce clashes. The Ioakim Chronicle says that Vladimir's uncle, Dobrynya, forced the Novgorodians into Christianity "by fire", while the local mayor, Putyata, persuaded his compatriots to accept Christian faith "by the sword". At that same time, Bishop Ioakim Korsunianin built the first, wooden, Cathedral of Holy Wisdom "with 13 tops" on the site of a pagan cemetery.

Even almost a century after the baptism, instances of pagan reaction were documented in Novgorod, Rostov Land and Kyiv. The long preservation of pre-Christian practices is demonstrated by the persistence of pagan burial rituals and mention of Slavic deities in the late-12th century Tale of Igor's Campaign. Paganism persisted in the country for a long time, surfacing during the Upper Volga Uprising and other occasional pagan protests. The northeastern part of the country, centred on Rostov, was particularly hostile to the new religion. Novgorod itself faced a pagan uprising as late as 1071, in which Bishop Fedor faced a real threat to his person; Prince Gleb Sviatoslavich broke up the crowd by chopping a sorcerer in half with an axe.

The Christianization of Rus firmly allied it with the Byzantine Empire. The Greek learning and book culture was adopted in Kiev and other centres of the country. Churches started to be built on the Byzantine model. During the reign of Vladimir's son Yaroslav I, Metropolitan Ilarion authored the first known work of East Slavic literature, an elaborate oration in which he favourably compared Rus to other lands known as the "Sermon on Law and Grace". The Ostromir Gospels, produced in Novgorod during the same period, was the first dated East Slavic book fully preserved. But the only surviving work of lay literature, The Tale of Igor's Campaign, indicates that a degree of pagan worldview remained under Christian Kievan Rus'.

In 1988, the faithful of the Eastern Catholic and Orthodox churches which have roots in the baptism of Kiev celebrated a millennium of Eastern Slavic Christianity. The great celebrations in Moscow changed the character of relationship between the Soviet state and the church. For the first time since 1917, numerous churches and monasteries were returned to the Russian Orthodox Church. In Ukrainian communities around the world, members of various Ukrainian churches also celebrated the Millennium of Christianity in Ukraine.

In 2008, the National Bank of Ukraine issued into circulation commemorative coins "Christianization of Kievan Rus" within "Rebirth of the Christian Spirituality in Ukraine" series.

In 2022, the traditional date of the holiday was granted the status of state public holiday in Ukraine under the title of Statehood Day.

== Gallery ==
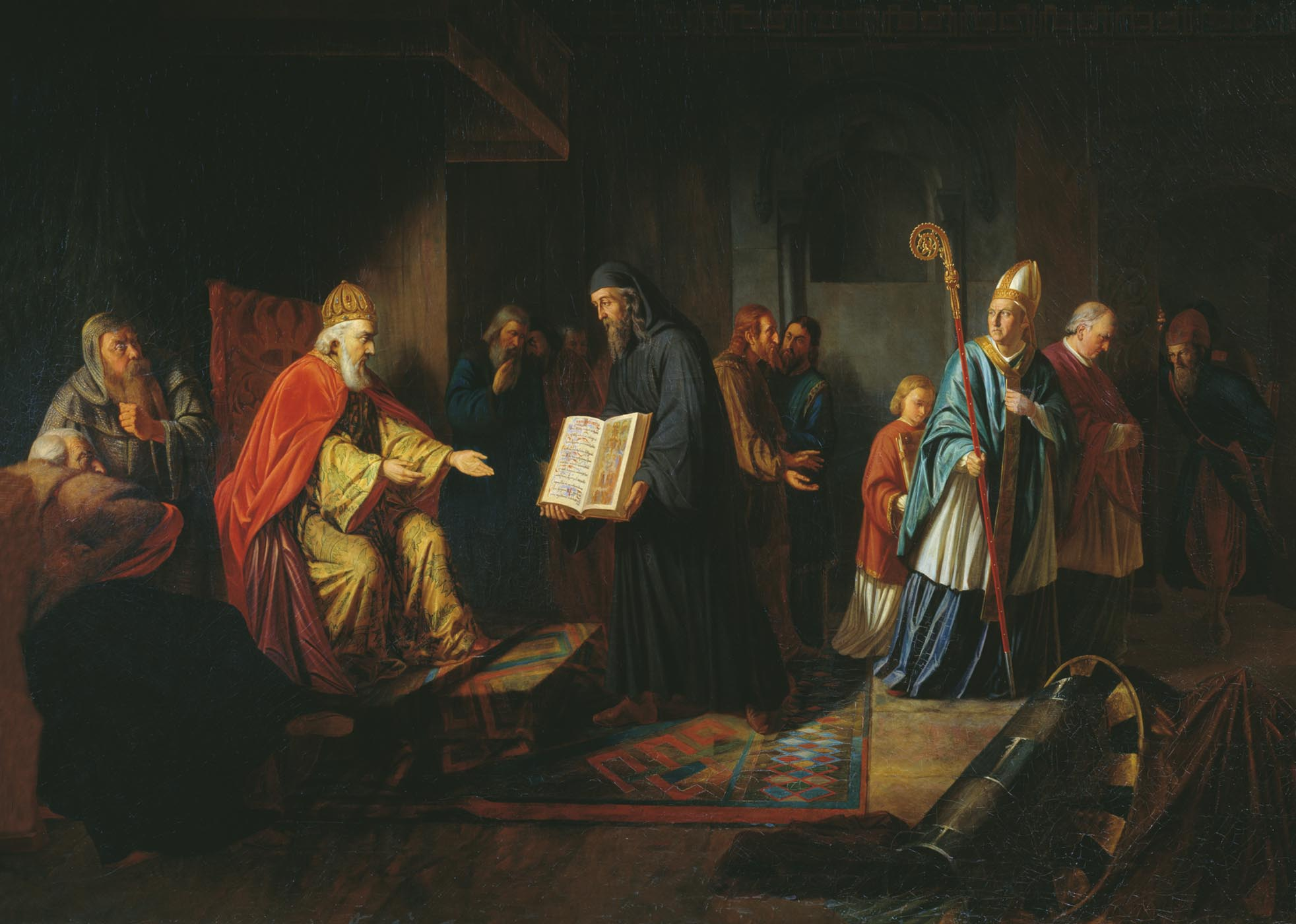
Vladimir listening to the Orthodox priests, while the papal envoy stands aside in discontent (Ivan Eggink 1822)

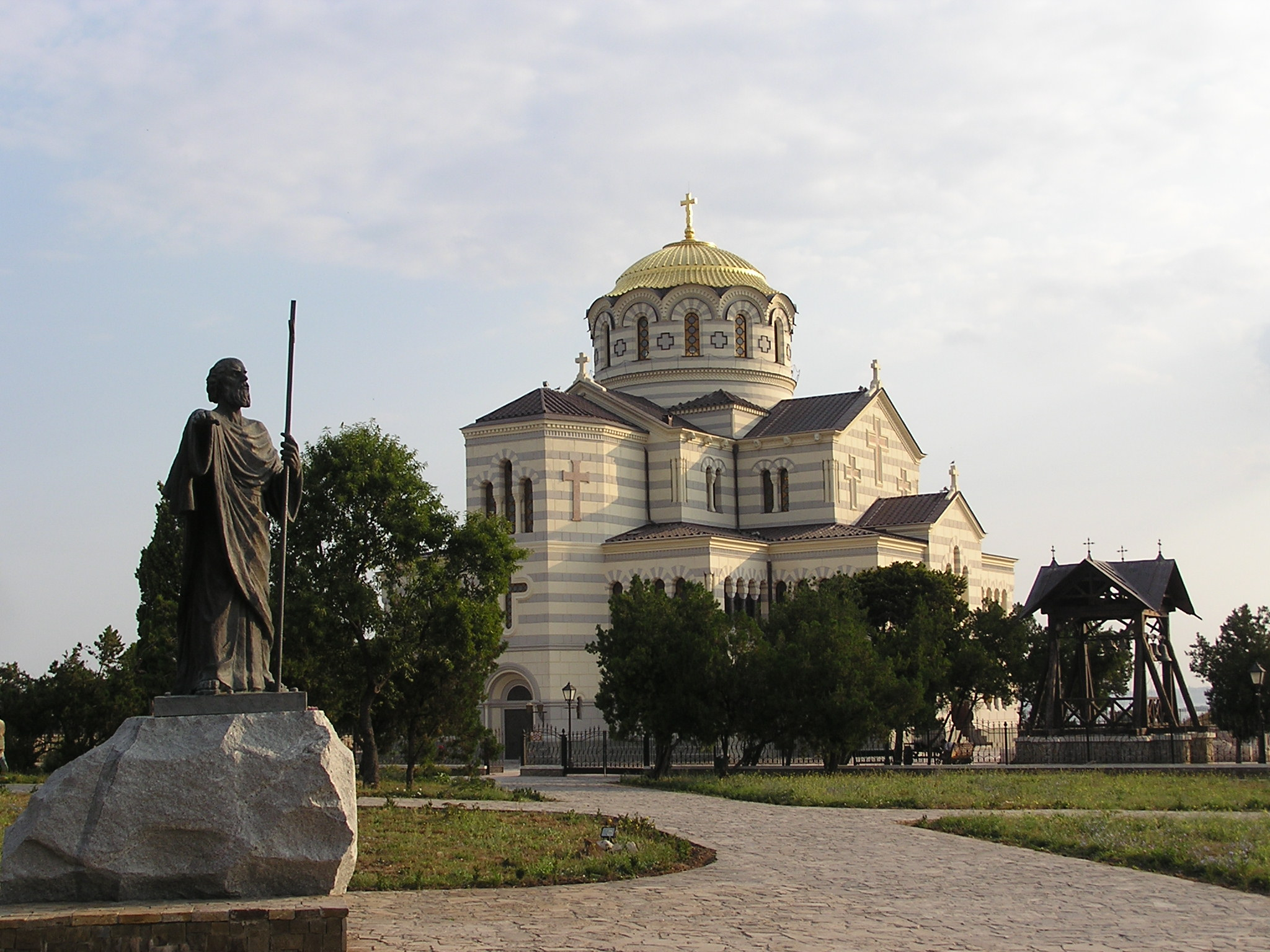
St. Vladimir's Cathedral in Chersonesus, with the statue of Saint Andrew in the foreground

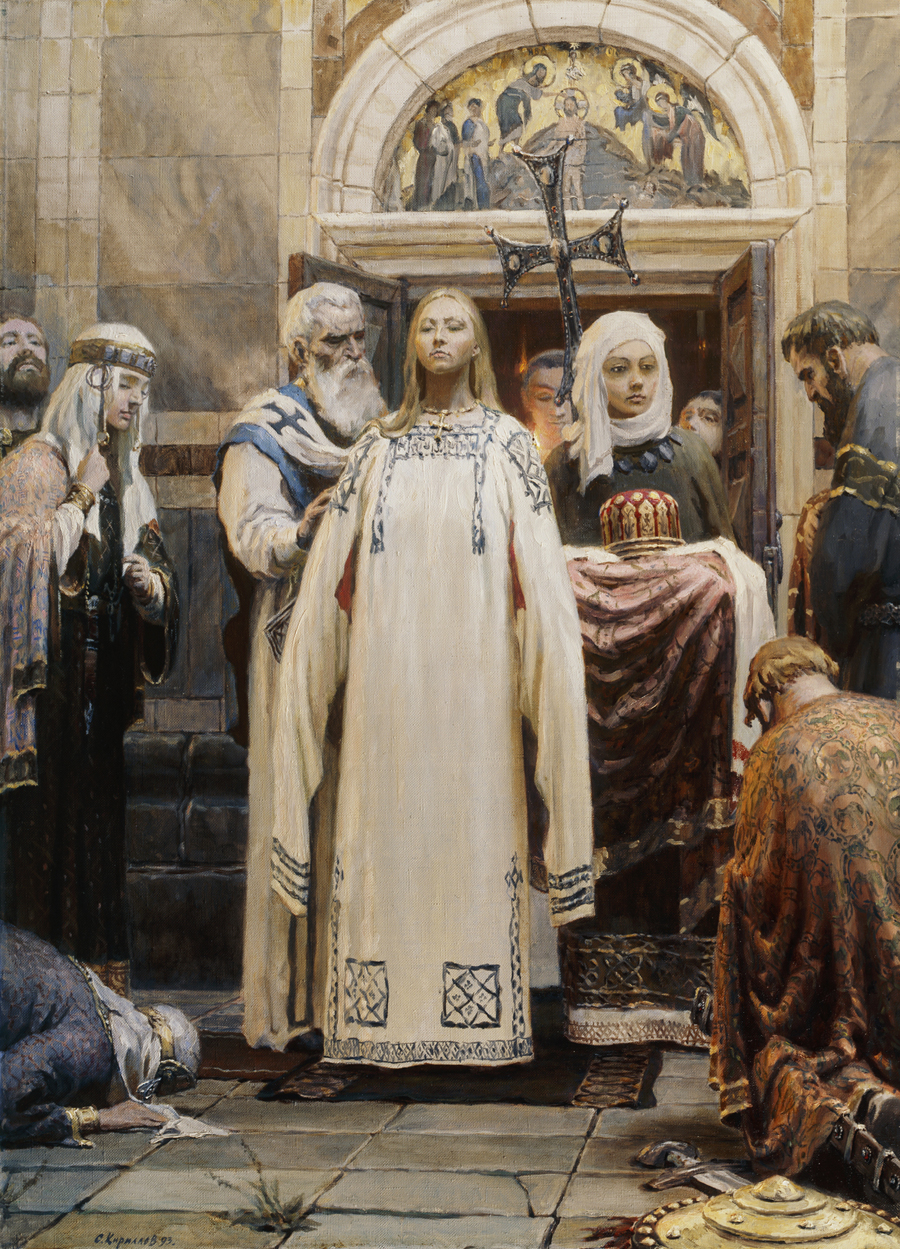
Baptism of Olga of Kiev (Sergey Kirillov 1993)

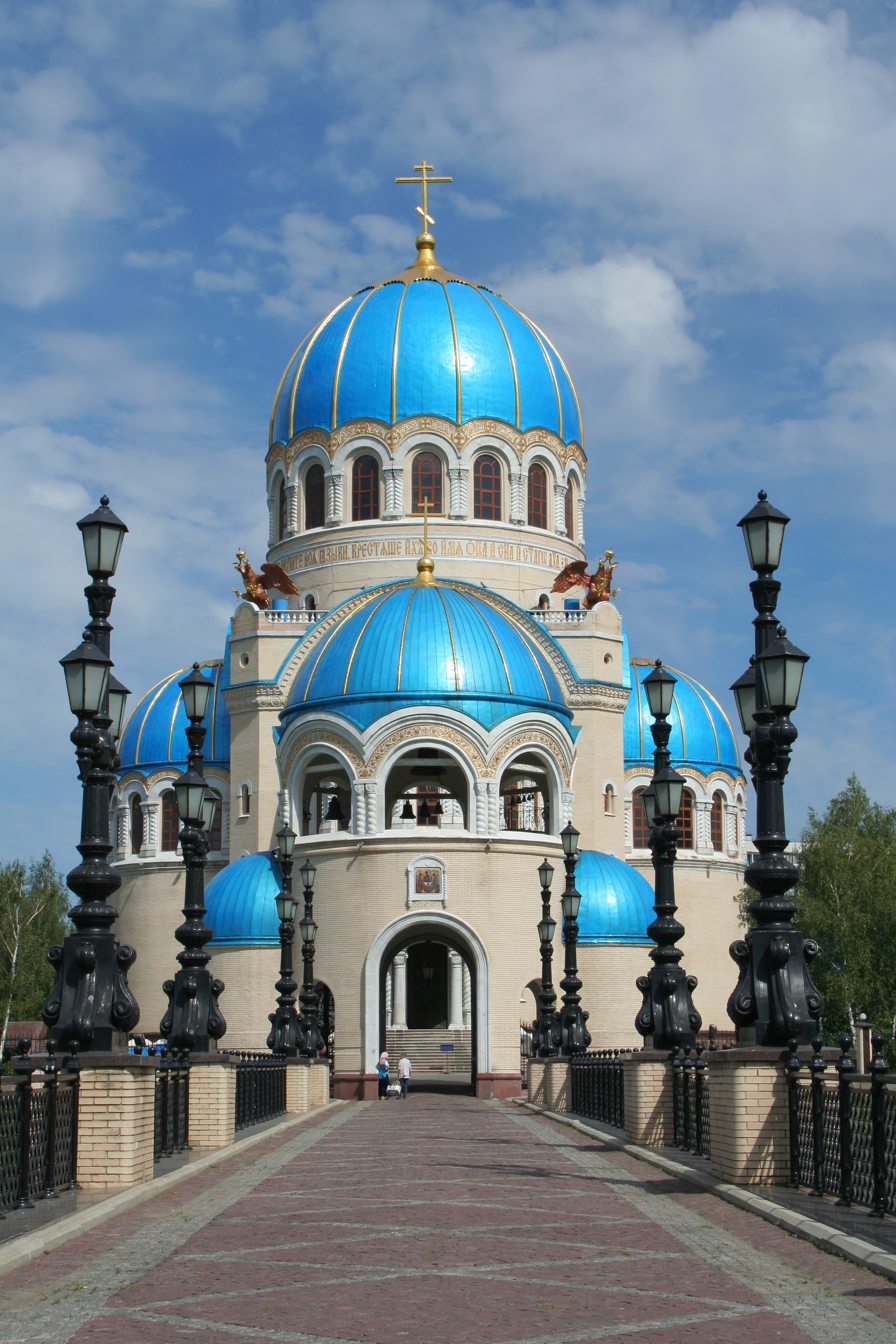
The Orekhovo-Borisovo Cathedral was built in the 21st century to celebrate the millennium of the Baptism of Rus'

== See also ==
- Chersonesus Cathedral
- Christianization of Poland
- Christianity in the 10th century
- Theodore the Varangian and his son John
- Statehood Day (Ukraine)

== Bibliography ==
- Cross, Samuel Hazzard; Sherbowitz-Wetzor, Olgerd P. (1930). The Russian Primary Chronicle, Laurentian Text. Translated and edited by Samuel Hazzard Cross and Olgerd P. Sherbowitz-Wetzor (1930) (PDF). Cambridge, Massachusetts: The Mediaeval Academy of America.
- Katchanovski, Ivan; Kohut, Zenon E.; Nesebio, Bohdan Y.; Yurkevich, Myroslav (2013). Historical Dictionary of Ukraine. Lanham, Maryland; Toronto; Plymouth: Scarecrow Press. p. 992. ISBN 9780810878471.
- Ostrowski, Donald (2006). "The Account of Volodimer's Conversion in the "Povest' vremennykh let": A Chiasmus of Stories". Harvard Ukrainian Studies. 28 (1–4). Harvard Ukrainian Research Institute: 567–580. JSTOR 41036982.
- Ostrowski, Donald; Birnbaum, David J. (7 December 2014). "Rus' primary chronicle critical edition – Interlinear line-level collation". pvl.obdurodon.org (in Church Slavic). Archived from the original on 28 April 2025.
- Santos Marinas, Enrique (2011). "Christian Myths of Origin among the East Slavs: The alleged Apostolic Roots of Christianity in the Kievan Rus'". Europe of Nations. Myths of Origin. Aveiro: Aveiro University. pp. 324–335.
- Thuis, Hans (2015). Nestorkroniek. De oudste geschiedenis van het Kievse Rijk (in Dutch). Nijmegen: Uitgeverij Vantilt. p. 304. ISBN 9789460042287.
