= Conversion of Vladimir the Great =

Religious conversion of Vladimir the Great to Byzantine Christianity

The Conversion of Vladimir is a narrative recorded in several different versions in medieval sources about how Vladimir the Great converted from Slavic paganism to Byzantine Christianity in the 980s.

In traditional historiography, it is known as the Baptism of Volodimer, (Note: Old Church Slavonic: Крьщєниѥ Володимѣра, romanized: Krĭštenijĕ Volodiměra; Belarusian: Хрышчэнне Уладзіміра, romanized: Khryshchennye Uladzimira; Russian: Крещение Владимира, romanized: Kreshchenie Vladimira; Ukrainian: Хрещення Володимира, romanized: Khreshchennia Volodymyra.) and regarded as the highlight of the Christianization of Kievan Rus' (dubbed the Baptism of Rus').

What virtually all accounts agree on is that Volodimer's baptism happened around the same time as two other events: Volodimer's marriage to Byzantine princess Anna Porphyrogenita, sister of co-emperors Basil II and Constantine VIII, and Volodimer's siege and capture of a Byzantine city in the Crimean peninsula called Chersonesus (Medieval Greek: Χερσών, romanized: Chersōn; Church Slavonic: Кърсунь/корсоунь, romanized: Kŭrsunĭ/Korsun', modern Ukrainian and Russian: Херсон(ес) Kherson(es) (Note: Not to be confused with the present-day city of Kherson, named after it, and founded in 1778 (since 1803 capital of the Kherson Governorate), in present-day mainland Ukraine.)). What they disagree on is how these three events were related, in which sequence they happened, and why. The entire conversion story covers a large chunk of the Primary Chronicle (PVL): pages 84–121, or 37 out of a total of 286 pages (12.9%) of the entire text.

== According to the earliest sources ==
=== Thietmar of Merseburg ===
German bishop Thietmar of Merseburg (c. 1015) described Volodimer as 'an immense fornicator' (Latin: fornicator immensus) until his marriage to a 'decent wife from Greece' (Latin: a Grecia decens uxorem) and adoption 'of the holy faith of Christianity at her instigation' (Latin: christianitatis sanctae fidem eius ortatu suscepit). Although his account is perhaps the earliest historical source of Volodimer's conversion, penned down about 28 years after the events, bishop Thietmar shows he is heavily biased against paganism and in favour of Christianity (showing no division yet between his own Western Latin Catholic and Volodimer's Byzantine Greek Orthodox version of it). In his view, it was this 'decent Greek wife' who instigated Volodimer to adopt the 'holy Christian faith' and abandon his pagan 'immense fornication'.

=== Jacob the Monk and Hilarion of Kiev ===
'The next year after baptism, he went to the thresholds, in the third year he took the city of Korsun'. (...) In those days there were two tsars in Tsarigradŭ: Constantine and Basil. And Volodimer sent to them, asking them for their sister as his wife – so that he would be strengthened even more in the Christian law.'

— Jacob the Monk, Memory and Eulogy of Volodimer (1040s)

In the Memory and Eulogy of Volodimer, (Note: Church Slavonic: Память и похвала князю русскому Володимеру, romanized: Pamyatĭ i poxvala knyazju russkomu Volodimeru, lit. 'Memory and praise to the Rus' prince Volodimer'.) the author (who identifies himself as a monk named "James" or "Jacob") claims that Volodimer was already baptised before his military campaign against Chersonesus (Kherson, Korsun) and his marriage to Byzantine princess Anna Porphyrogenita. This text is approximately dated to the 1040s, written about 60 years after the events.

Scholars think the Sermon on Law and Grace, attributed to metropolitan Hilarion of Kiev between 1037 and 1050, was written to take a stance in discussions on the canonisation of Volodimer that appeared to have been going on at the time. Whether he was worthy of sainthood depended on the question whether he himself took the initiative to get baptised, or whether it was primarily the result of Greek influence that he did so.

=== Yahya of Antioch ===
The earliest Arabic writer to mention the adoption of Christianity by the prince of Kiev was probably Yahya of Antioch (died c. 1066), a Melkite Christian originally from Alexandria who emigrated to Antioch, and 'in all likelihood had access to Byzantine material' there according to Jonsson Hraundal (2014). In 987, the generals Bardas Sclerus and Bardas Phocas revolted against the Byzantine emperor Basil II. Both rebels briefly joined forces and advanced on Constantinople. On 14 September 987, Bardas Phocas proclaimed himself emperor. Anxious to avoid the siege of his capital, Basil II turned to the Rus' for assistance, even though they were considered enemies at that time. Volodimer agreed, in exchange for a marital tie; he also agreed to accept Christianity as his religion and bring his people to the new faith. When the wedding arrangements were settled, Volodimer dispatched 6,000 troops to the Byzantine Empire and they helped to put down the revolt.

== According to the Primary Chronicle ==
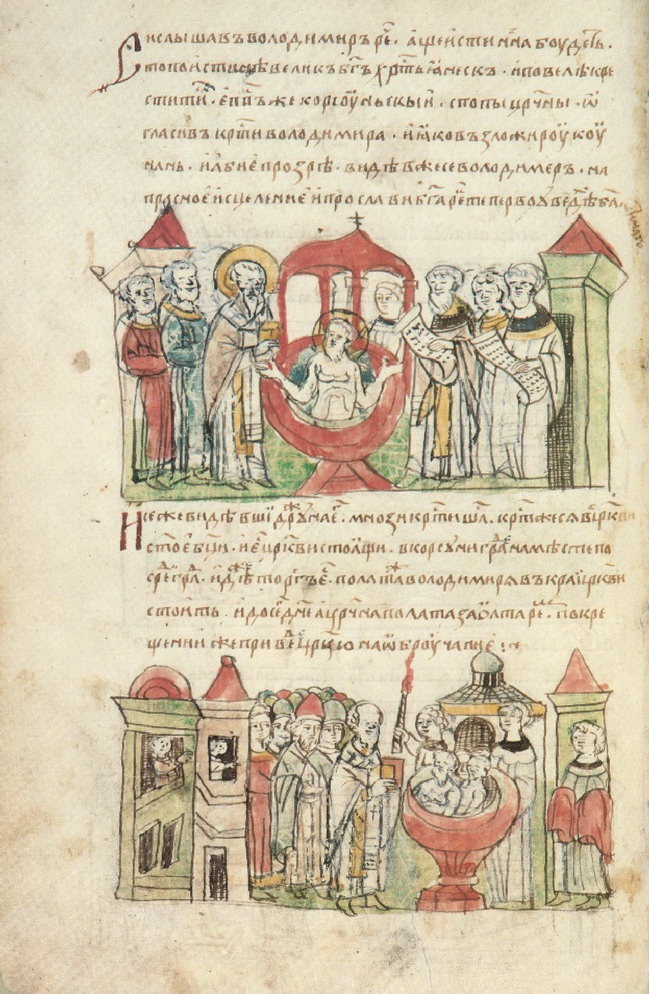
A miniature in the 15th-century Radziwiłł Chronicle depicting the baptism of Volodimer

The Primary Chronicle (Povest' vremennykh let, PVL), which was compiled in the 1110s, about 128 years after the events it narrates, contains the story of Volodimer's conversion in pages 84–121.

=== Contents ===
The account of Volodimer's conversion is a compilation of four distinct conversion stories loosely tied together (as identified by Donald Ostrowski 2006 and other scholars):

1. The "Examination of Religions" part 1: "the missionaries coming to Kyiv" – set in the year 6494 (986/7)
2. The "Examination of Religions" part 2: "Volodimer's sending envoys to various peoples" – set in the year 6495 (987/8)
3. The "Kherson/Korsun Legend" part 1: "the capture of Kherson resulting in negotiations for the hand of the sister of the co-emperors of Byzantium" – set in the year 6496 (988/9)
4. The "Kherson/Korsun Legend" part 2: "the curing of Volodimer's blindness through baptism".

==== "Missionaries coming to Kyiv" ====
The Primary Chronicle reports that, in the year 6495 (987), missionaries from 'the Bulgars' (representing Islam), 'the Germans' (Немци Nemtsi, representing Western Christianity), 'the Jews' (representing Judaism; these may have been Khazars), and 'the Greeks' (representing Eastern Christianity), came to Kiev to in attempts to have Volodimer convert to their particular religion. Ostrowski (2006) remarked: 'The entire episode of the missionaries is reminiscent of a disputation before the Khazar Khagan Bulan in the eighth century.'

The result is described in the following apocryphal anecdote. Upon the meeting with envoys of the Volga Bulgars, Volodimer found their religion unsuitable due to its requirement to circumcise and taboos against wine and pork; supposedly, Volodimer said on that occasion: "Drinking is the joy of the Rus'." He also consulted with Jewish envoys (who may or may not have been Khazars), questioned them about Judaism but ultimately rejected it, saying that their loss of Jerusalem was evidence of their having been abandoned by God. However, the long speech of a Greek philosopher (known as the "Philosopher's Speech"), providing an exegesis of the Old and New Testaments in favour of Eastern Christianity, impresses Volodimer. Nevertheless, he hesitates and does not convert.

==== "Volodimer's sending envoys to various peoples" ====
In the year 987, as the result of a consultation with his boyars, Volodimer sent envoys to study the religions of three neighbouring peoples – the Islamic Volga Bolgars, the Western Christian Germans, and the Eastern Christian Greeks, whose representatives had been urging him to embrace their respective faiths. It is unclear why no delegation was sent to the Jewish Khazars, who are also mentioned in story 1.

At Hagia Sophia, where the full festival ritual of the Byzantine Church was set in motion to impress them, they found their ideal: "We did not know whether we were in heaven or on earth", they reported.

Presented with these reports, once again clearly in favour of Greek Eastern Christianity, Volodimer again hesitates, and does not convert.

==== "Capture of Kherson, Byzantine princess marriage negotiations" ====
In the Primary Chronicle, the account of Volodimer's baptism is preceded by the so-called Korsun Legend. According to this apocryphal story, in 988 Volodimer besieges the Greek town of Kherson (Chersonesus, Korsun'). He tries to cut the city's water-supply, and vows to convert to Christianity if the plan works: "If this is successful, I will be baptised" (Church Slavonic: Аще се ся събудеть, имамь ся крьстити). However, Volodimer does not convert upon capturing the town, and the vow is never mentioned again.

After capturing Kherson, Volodimer sends a message threatening the co-emperors Basil and Constantine to attack and occupy Constantinople itself unless he is promised the hand of their sister, Anna Porphyrogenita, in marriage. The three monarchs then conduct negotiations, during which the emperors demand Volodimer be baptised before marrying off their sister to him, and Volodimer promises that he will be baptised by the priests in Anna's company once she arrives. Anna vehemently protests the whole arrangement: 'It is as if I were setting out into captivity,' she lamented; 'better were it for me to die at home'. Her co-Emperor brothers beg her to go: 'Through your agency God turns the land of Rus' to repentance, and you will relieve Greece from the danger of grievous war. Do you not see how much harm the Rus' have already brought upon the Greeks? If you do not set out, they may bring on us the same misfortunes.' Thus, for the sake of peace between Byzantium and Kiev, she agrees. A tearful princess Anna says goodbye to her homeland, and arrives at Kherson, where the town's inhabitants receive her.

==== "Curing of Volodimer's blindness through baptism" ====
Prior to the wedding, just when Anna arrives, Volodimer is suddenly struck by blindness. Anna tells him to get baptised so that he will regain his sight. And so he is baptised, instantly being cured from blindness. The Chronicle states that the baptism happened in Chersonesus, although the text says some people have mistakenly claimed it happened in Kiev, Vasil'ev, or elsewhere instead. The sacrament was followed by his marriage with the Byzantine princess.

=== Literary analysis ===
'Those who do not know the truth say he was baptized in Kyiv, while others said he was baptized in Vasil'ev, with still others saying elsewhere.'

— Sylvester, Primary Chronicle (1110s)

Shepard (1992) observed that each story works up to a punchline, namely the ruler's conversion, but each time Volodimer hesitates and postpones the decision, whereupon the next story immediately begins. Ostrowski (2006) argued that 'the view that the account appearing in the PVL is mostly a literary invention should now be accepted.' He argued that the narrative was a compilation of four distinct stories involving five separate traditions that were woven into a single account, but the traces of the originally separate stories can still be found, including internal contradictions. The compiler, probably Sylvester of Kiev, noted that there was disagreement about where Volodimer was baptised, himself insisting that it happened at Kherson by saying: 'Those who do not know the truth say he was baptized in Kyiv, while others said he was baptized in Vasil'ev, with still others saying elsewhere.' This shows that Sylvester had access to multiple inconsistent accounts, had to choose which one to believe, copyedit, and write down, and to exclude all those sources which said something else about where the baptism happened (at least three competing alternative locations in total). Four of the five traditions contained elements which 'are similar to, and borrow from, traditions told about the conversion of previous rulers in other countries, and thus can be considered literary commonplaces.'

Although 'Jews' are mentioned in "Examination of Religions" part 1, Volodimer does not send any envoys to the Khazars in part 2; Ostrowski suggested 'probably it was because no independent Khazar kingdom existed at that time.' Ostrowski found Volodimer's vow to convert upon the capture of Kherson to be 'gratuitous', and 'completely out of context' if it weren't for Volodimer's already implicit sympathy for Byzantine Christianity due to the two earlier "Examination of Religions" stories, judging that this one sentence containing a pre-conquest vow 'more likely represents a different tradition'. The vow does not make sense in the story: Volodimer does not make this promise to anyone who asks him (unlike the two previous occasions), and after he captures Kherson, Volodimer does not follow through and convert; the vow isn't even mentioned again after the battle.

About the last part, Ostrowski observed: 'From a narrative point of view, story 4 appears unnecessary, since Volodimer has already promised to be baptized as soon as Anna arrives with priests.'

=== Stylistic analysis ===
Donald Ostrowski (2006) identified two chiastic structures within the Primary Chronicle (PVL) account of Volodimer's conversion.

Chiastic structure of the "Examination of Religions" (story 1 and story 2)
A: 'Foreign missionaries come to Volodimer in Kyiv to tell about their respective religions'

B: 'Volodimer decides to wait a little so he can find out about all religions'

X: 'Volodimer calls boyars and elders to find out what he should do'

B': 'Volodimer is advised to send envoys to find out about each religion'

A': 'Volodimer sends envoys out to report on the religions of the people they visit'

Chiastic structure of the "Kherson Legend" (story 3 and story 4)
A: 'Volodimer vows to be baptized if he is successful in capturing Kherson'

B: Volodimer takes Kherson but is not baptized'

C: 'Volodimer demands marriage to Anna, sister of the Byzantine co-emperors'

D: 'The Emperors agree in principle to send Anna'

E: 'The Emperors propose that Volodimer be baptized first'

X: 'Volodimer's counterproposal to be baptized by Anna's priests'

E': 'The Emperors agree to Volodimer's counterproposal'

D': 'The Emperors send Anna to Kherson'

C': 'Anna arrives in Kherson to be married to Volodimer'

B': 'Volodimer's blindness related'

A': 'Volodimer is baptized on Anna's instruction and regains his sight'

=== Historical analysis ===
'It is an obvious anachronism to represent Byzantine Christianity before 1054 as a different religion (as different as Judaism or Islam) from Catholic Christianity.'

— Samuel Hazzard Cross (1930)

Andrzej Poppe (1988) dated the "Examination of Religions" narrative to 'not earlier than the second half of the eleventh century', and the "Kherson Legend" to the 1070s–1080s. These traditions were compiled in the 1110s into the Primary Chronicle (PVL) account of Volodimer's conversion, about 128 years after the purported events. It gives insights about what the Chronicle's compilers thought had happened. Johnsson Hraundal added that 'the text [of the Primary Chronicle] was compiled much later than the period in question, in a rather different context, and is first and foremost a literary expression of the civilization and political system prevailing in Kiev at the time of its composition.'

Cross (1930) mentioned that 'the presentation of this story in which Western Christianity represented as a religion that is as different from Eastern Christianity as Islam and Judaism presupposes that the final split between Rome and Constantinople, which usually is dated to 1054, had already occurred.' Jonsson Hraundal stated that one of the PVL's goals was 'to write the Rus lands and its people into Christian universal history', and that the adoption of Christianity was one of the narratives which could be corroborated due to being attested in Byzantine sources. However, Ostrowski remarked that regarding Volodimer's conversion 'only one of the [five] traditions – negotiations for the hand of Anna – finds independent corroboration in other sources of the time.'

Traditional Russian, Ukrainian and Belarusian historiography had assumed Volodimer was solely motivated to conquer Chersonesus in order to force the Byzantine emperors to marry off their sister to him. According to Poppe, the siege and capture of Chersonesus by the military of Kievan Rus' had to be connected with the concurrent rebellion of Bardas Phokas the Younger (February 987 – October 989), in which Chersonesus fell to rebel hands, while Volodimer allied with the forces loyal to the Byzantine emperors and (re)captured it on their behalf. Building on the work of both Poppe and Ostrowski, the historian Alex M. Feldman argues that the marriage arrangement, the promise to convert to (Byzantine) Christianity, and the siege of Chersonesus, were thus all part of that alliance between Volodimer and Basil & Constantine against the rebel forces of Phokas.

== According to later foreign sources ==
According to an account written by Sharaf al-Zaman al-Marwazi (died 1124), the Rūs converted to Christianity "in the year 300" (which would have been 'around 912' according to Jonsson Hraundal), but were unhappy with it because Christianity had 'blunted their swords', and they 'desired to become Muslims'. Their 'independent king called V.lādmīr' supposedly sent messengers to the king of Khwarezm, who 'was delighted at their eagerness to become Muslims, and sent someone to teach them the religious laws of Islam. So they were converted.' Sherbowitz-Wetzor (1953) commented that this account 'contains, in an exaggerated form, an indication of Islamic proselytism in Rus'.' Shepard (1992) interpreted it as 'strongly corroborat[ing] the Slavic sources' that Volodimer's conversion was initiated by himself rather than the Byzantine church or emperor, but Ostrowski countered that the Primary Chronicle 'does not ascribe to Volodimer the initiative for his own conversion', since the foreign missionaries 'come unbeckoned to Kyiv'. Moreover, Marwazi claimed Volodimer sent four kinsmen to Khwarezm and that a sage returned to Kiev to convert him (which he does), whereas the PVL has the Islamic missionaries come from Bolghar, after which Volodimer sends agents to Bolghar; nobody is said to come back to Kiev to invite him to join the Muslim religion afterwards (which he doesn't). Ostrowski thus saw more differences than similarities between the two accounts, and they contradicted rather than corroborated each other.

The followers of Yahya of Antioch – al-Rudhrawari, al-Makin, Al-Dimashqi, and ibn al-Athir (Note: Ibn al-Athir dates these events to 985 or 986.) – give essentially the same account as Yahya before them.

== See also ==
- Calling of the Varangians – another story in the Primary Chronicle
- Chersonesus Cathedral – built 1850–1876
- Christianization of Kievan Rus' – wider historical context and process
- Textual criticism of the Primary Chronicle – scholarly efforts to reconstruct the original form of the Primary Chronicle's text

== Bibliography ==
=== Primary sources ===
- Cross, Samuel Hazzard; Sherbowitz-Wetzor, Olgerd P. (1953) [1930]. The Russian Primary Chronicle, Laurentian Text. Translated and edited by Samuel Hazzard Cross and Olgerd P. Sherbowitz-Wetzor (1953) (PDF). Cambridge, Massachusetts: The Mediaeval Academy of America. p. 325.
- Ostrowski, Donald; Birnbaum, David J. (7 December 2014). "Rus' primary chronicle critical edition – Interlinear line-level collation". pvl.obdurodon.org (in Church Slavic). Archived from the original on 28 April 2025.
- Minorsky, V. (1942). Sharaf al-Zaman Tahir Marvazi on China, the Turks and India. London: The Royal Asiatic Society. p. 234.
- Milyutenko, N. I. (1997). "Память и похвала князю русскому Володимеру" [Memory and praise to the Rus' prince Volodimer]. Pushkin House (in Church Slavic and Russian).

=== Literature ===
- Jonsson Hraundal, Thorir (2014). "New Perspectives on Eastern Vikings/Rus in Arabic Sources". Viking and Medieval Scandinavia. 10: 65–97. doi:10.1484/j.vms.5.105213.
- Ostrowski, Donald (2006). "The Account of Volodimer's Conversion in the "Povest' vremennykh let": A Chiasmus of Stories". Harvard Ukrainian Studies. 28 (1–4). Harvard Ukrainian Research Institute: 567–580. JSTOR 41036982.
- Poppe, Andrzej (1988). "Two Concepts of the Conversion of Rus' in Kievan Writings". Harvard Ukrainian Studies. Proceedings of the International Congress Commemorating the Millennium of Christianity in Rus'-Ukraine 1988–1989. 12. Harvard Ukrainian Research Institute: 488–504. JSTOR 41036329.
- Shepard, Jonathan (1992). "Some Remarks on the Sources for the Conversion of Rus'". Le Origini e lo sviluppo della Cristianità slavo-bizantina. Volume 17 of Nuovi studi storici. Rome: Istituto Storico Italiano per il Medio Evo. p. 64.
