= Old Russians =

Theorized ethnic group

According to some historians, the Old Russian people (Russian: Древнерусская народность, romanized: Drevnerusskaya narodnost', Ukrainian: Давньоруська народність, romanized: Davnʹorusʹka narodnistʹ) were a unified ethnic group that emerged from East Slavic tribes of the Kievan Rus. The foundations for this theory were laid by Sergei Tokarev and further developed by Boris Rybakov and Pyotr Tretyakov. However, this theory is controversial among historians.

== In favour of the theorized existence of the Old Russians ==
Proponents of this concept cite the historically disputed use of a common Old Russian language, close regional political and economic ties, a common spiritual and material culture, a common Russian Orthodox religion, a shared system of law, customs, traditions, and warfare, a common struggle against external enemies and the awareness of the unity of the Rus depicted in the sources as characteristics of ethnic unity. The disappearance of old tribal names from sources starting in the middle of the 12th century onwards in favor of the term “Russian people” which is also used as an argument for ethnic unity. Last but not least, proponents of the concept of the Old Russian people point to comparative studies with other countries and regions of Europe such as Germany, France, Scandinavia, Poland, which demonstrate a greater sense of ethnic consciousness among the Rus during this period.

== Against the theorized existence of the Old Russians ==
Opponents of the theory of a unified Old Russian people argue that within the relatively short period of two centuries before the Mongol invasion, no unified ethnic group could have emerged over such a large area. Furthermore, the Kievan Rus was a relative loose federation of various principalities. The territory of Rus was also unevenly populated and the population consisted of Baltic, Turkic and Finno-Ugric tribes. Furthermore, the commonality in language, religion and culture can only be confirmed among the rulers, but not for the population. There is no evidence for a supposed common colloquial language in the Kievan Rus. Volodymyr Rachka and Petro Tolochko therefore suggest using the term “Old Russian ethnocultural community”, which subsumes the various heterogeneous population groups in Kievan Rus.

== See also ==
- Rus' people
- Russians
- Ruthenians
- All-Russian nation

== Literature ==
- Третьяков, П.Н. У истоков древнерусской народности, «Наука», 1970
- Лебединский, М.Ю. К вопросу об истории древнерусской народности. Москва, 1997
- Седов, В.В. Древнерусская народность. М.: Языки русской культуры, 1999
- Толочко, П.П. Древнерусская народность: воображаемая или реальная. – СПб.: Алетейя, 2005
