= Theodore the Varangian and his son John =

Christian martyrs in the Primary Chronicle

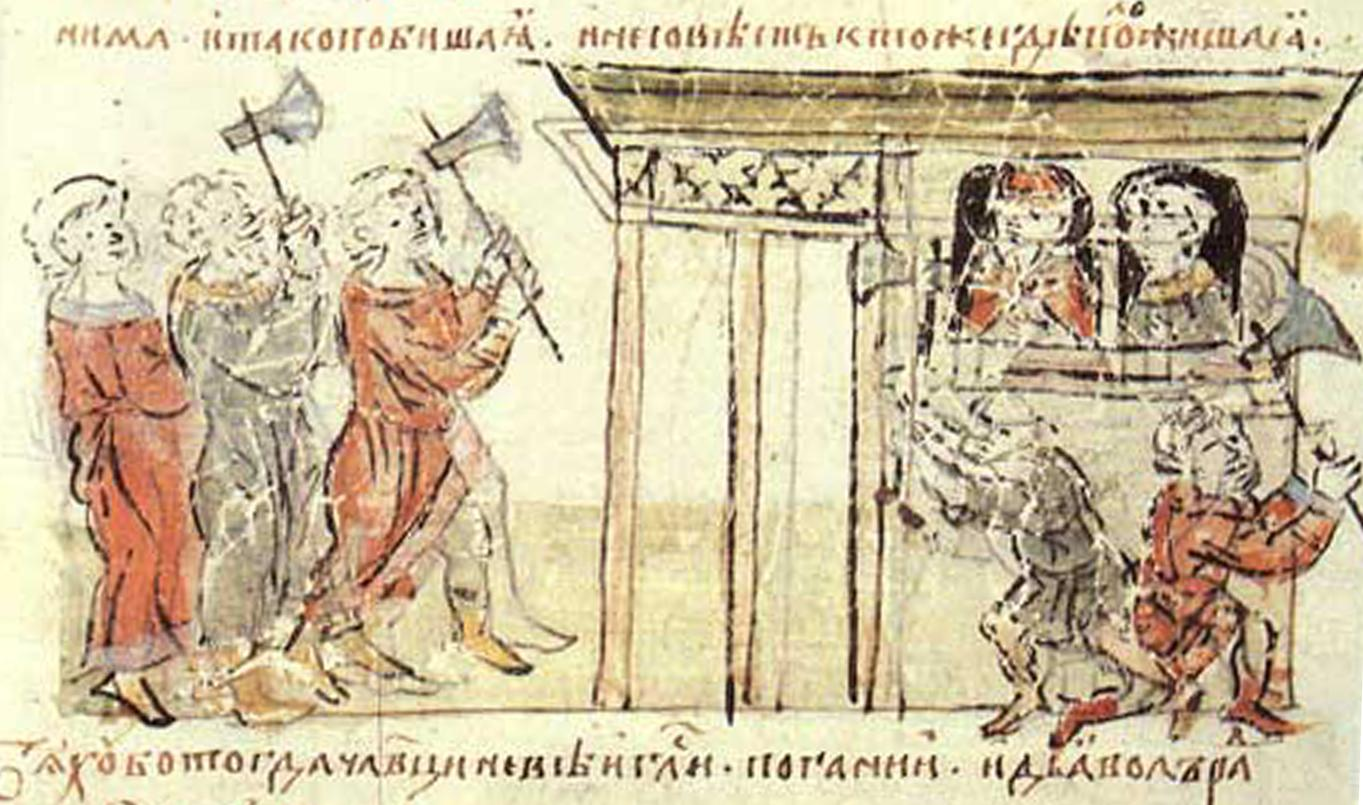
Murder of Martyrs Theodor the Varangian and his son John. Radziwiłł Chronicle

Theodore the Varangian and his son John (Note: Russian: Феодор Варяг и сын его Иоанн, romanized: Feodor Varyag i syn yego Ioann. Ukrainian: Феодор-варяг і син його Іван, romanized: Feodor-varyah i syn joho Ivan.) (10th century) are the names traditionally attributed to a Varangian Christian man from Greece and his young son living in Kiev (modern Kyiv), who were killed in a story recorded in the Primary Chronicle under the year 6491 (983). The chronicle glorifies their deaths as examples of Christian martyrs who suffered persecution by the pagan establishment of Kievan Rus' during the reign of prince Vladimir the Great (before his own conversion to Byzantine Christianity around 988).

== Early life ==
According to Saint Nestor the Chronicler, Tur (Thor) had served in the military at Constantinople before being baptised as a Christian and changing his name to Theodore; his son John was also a devout Christian.

== Text in the Primary Chronicle ==
Under the year 6491 (983; pages 82.5–83.25), the Primary Chronicle reports the following story:

Vladimir marched on the Yatvingians, conquered them, and seized their territory. He returned to Kiev, and together with his people made sacrifice to the idols. And the elders and boyars said: "Let us cast lots upon the boys and girls. Upon whichever one it falls, that one we shall slaughter in sacrifice to the gods." Now there was a certain Varangian whose house was situated by the spot where now stands the Church of the Holy Virgin which Vladimir built. This Varangian had immigrated from Greece. He adhered to the Christian faith, and he had a son, fair in face and in heart, on whom, through the devil's hatred, the lot fell. [...]

Messengers thus came and said to the father, "Since the lot has fallen upon your son, the gods have claimed him as their own. Let us therefore make sacrifice to the gods." But the Varangian replied, "These are not gods, but only idols of wood. Today it is, and tomorrow it will rot away. These gods do not eat, or drink, or speak; they are fashioned by hand out of wood. But the God whom the Greeks serve and worship is one; it is he who has made heaven and earth, the stars, the moon, the sun, and mankind, and has granted him life upon earth. But what have these gods created? They are themselves manufactured. I will not give up my son to devils."

So the messengers went back and reported to the people. The latter took up arms, marched against the Varangian and his son, and on breaking down the stockade about his house, found him standing with his son upon the porch. They then called upon him to surrender his son that they might offer him to the gods. But he replied, "If they be gods, they will send one of their number to take my son. What need have you of him?" They straightway raised a shout, and broke up the structure under them. Thus the people killed them, and no one knows where they are buried. For at this time the people were ignorant pagans. [...]

== Later traditions ==
The pagans killed both father and son in their own home. Martin C. Putna (2021) commented that although they clearly had fewer ulterior motives than other early Rus' martyrs, the two have a surprisingly meagre following.

The exact date of the death of Theodore and John is unknown. According to the traditional version, their demise came on July 12, 978, the day after Vladimir of Kiev's succession to the throne was celebrated with pagan thanksgiving to the gods including human sacrifices; however, some historians argue this event happened in summer of 983, during the revolt of the Gentiles throughout the Slavic-Germanic world.

According to legend, Theodore and John's courage standing alone against the crowd of angry pagans so impressed Vladimir with its sincerity that it influenced his decision to become a Christian.

== Sainthood ==
Theodore and John became the first Orthodox martyrs in Russia, and the Russian Orthodox Church recognised them as saints less than one hundred years after their death.

The Desyatin Church of the Dormition of the Most Holy Theotokos was built on top of the saints’ home; it also housed the relics of Saint Olga.

They are the patron saints of women who have miscarried; they are commemorated on 12 July.

== Bibliography ==
=== Primary sources ===
- Cross, Samuel Hazzard; Sherbowitz-Wetzor, Olgerd P. (1953). The Russian Primary Chronicle, Laurentian Text. Translated and edited by Samuel Hazzard Cross and Olgerd P. Sherbowitz-Wetzor (PDF). Cambridge, Massachusetts: The Mediaeval Academy of America. p. 325. (second edition 1953; first published in 1930)
- Ostrowski, Donald; Birnbaum, David J. (7 December 2014). "Rus' primary chronicle critical edition - Interlinear line-level collation". pvl.obdurodon.org (in Church Slavic). Archived from the original on 28 April 2025. – A 2014 improved digitised version of the 2003 Ostrowski et al. edition.
- Thuis, Hans (2015). Nestorkroniek. De oudste geschiedenis van het Kievse Rijk (in Dutch). Nijmegen: Uitgeverij Vantilt. p. 304. ISBN 9789460042287.

=== Church websites ===
- The Holy Martyrs Theodore (Feodor) the Varangian and his son John
