= Jacob Chornoryzets =

Jacob the Monk (Ukrainian: Яків Чорноризець; Russian: Иаков Черноризец) was an 11th-century monk and author in Kievan Rus'. He is known for an ode to Vladimir the Great in honor of his conversion of Kievan Rus to Christianity in 988, as well as a work on Boris and Gleb.
