= Alexander Vostokov =

Russian philologist (1781–1864)

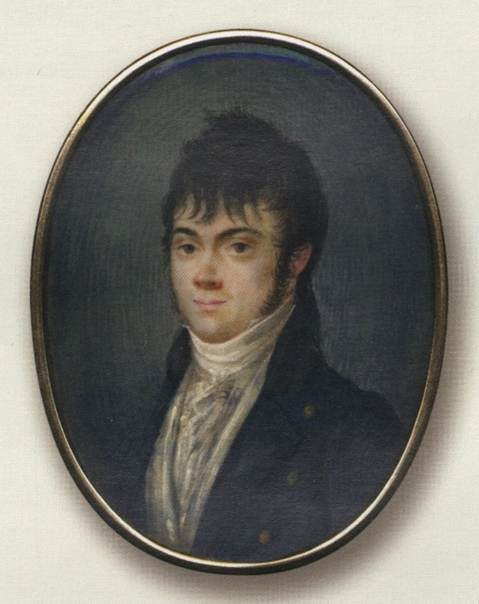
- Born: 27 March [O.S. 16 March] 1781
- Died: 20 February 1864 (aged 82)
- Occupations: Philologist; poet; translator

Alexander Khristoforovich Vostokov (born Alexander Woldemar Osteneck; Russian: Алекса́ндр Христофо́рович Восто́ков; 27 March 1781 – 20 February 1864) was a Russian philologist and poet. He was among the first significant scholars of Russian verse and versification, as well as one of the founders of comparative Slavic linguistics in Russia.

== Background ==
He was born into a Baltic German family on 27 March [O.S. 16 March] 1781, in Arensburg, then part of the Governorate of Livonia, and studied at the Imperial Academy of Arts in Saint Petersburg. As a natural son of Baron von Osten-Sacken, he received the name Osteneck, which he later chose to render into Russian as Vostokov (Ost, the German word for "east," translates to vostok in Russian). In his poem Svetlana and Mstislav (Russian: Светлана и Мстислав, written in 1802), he used the female name Svetlana, which would later gain popularity through Vasily Zhukovsky's eponymous ballad.

In 1815, he joined the staff of the Imperial Public Library, where he studied the oldest dated book of Kievan Rus', the Ostromir Gospels. In 1841, Vostokov was elected to the Russian Academy of Sciences. He died on 20 February [O.S. 8 February] 1864.

== Poetry ==
Vostokov published his first poetical works in 1802. He experimented with a variety of verse forms, including imitation of ancient quantitative and Russian folk metres; these poems in new metres were published in two volumes in 1805–1806 and supplied with Vostokov's own philological commentary. In the Study of Russian Versification, published in 1812 and again in 1817, he developed the theory of Russian accentual verse. His second book of poetry was published in 1821, and afterwards he focused on linguistic studies.

== Philological works ==
Vostokov's works on the Old Church Slavonic language were considered a high-water mark of Slavic studies and garnered him the doctorates honoris causa from the Charles University and University of Tübingen. In 1820, he published the influential Discourse Upon the Slavic Language (Рассуждение о славянском языке) where he clarified several aspects of the history and grammar of Old Church Slavonic (OCS). He introduced the methods of comparative historical linguistics to the study of Slavic languages, distinguished between OCS, its later recensions, and the Slavic vernaculars; he concluded that the OCS letters ⟨Ѧ⟩ and ⟨Ѫ⟩ represented nasal vowels, on the basis of their usage in the Ostromir Gospels and their correspondence to Polish nasal vowels. Afterwards, he published the first edition of Ostromir Gospels (1843), an extensive (Old) Church Slavonic dictionary in two volumes (1858–1861), describing around 22,000 words, and an Old Church Slavonic grammar (1863).

Vostokov also contributed to the study of Russian: his Shortened Russian Grammar and Russian Grammar were published in 1831 and republished a number of times thereafter. In his grammars, Vostokov was the first to recognise Russian singularia and pluralia tantum nouns, and common gender nouns, as well as set the basis for the study of Russian accentuation.

Beside the Church Slavonic dictionary, Vostokov edited two contemporary Russian dictionaries. The first was the four-volume Dictionary of Church Slavonic and Russian Language; the second was the Regional Great Russian Dictionary, the first dialectological dictionary of Russian. It was published in 1852 and contained 18,011 words; an additional volume with ~20,000 words was published in 1858. The dictionary exerted influence on Vladimir Dal, the author of the Explanatory Dictionary of the Living Great Russian Language (1863–1866) which also contained extensive dialectal material.

Vostokov laid foundations of modern Russian toponymy. In 1812, he published the article A Task for the Enthusiasts of Etymology (Russian: Задача любителям этимологии), where he argued that toponyms have repeating elements which he called formants and which help to restore the etymology of the name. For instance, the endings -va, -ga, and -ma in the end of such names as Sylva, Onega, and Kama, may mean "water" in the languages these names originate from. Whereas this article did not get sufficient attention during Vostokov's life, it did subsequently receive recognition, and Vostokov is cited as one of the founders of toponymy in Russia.

== List of works ==
=== Books ===
- Опыты лирическія и другія мелкія сочиненія въ стихахъ. Санктпетербургъ: Морская Типографія. [Lyrical Attempts and Other Minor Works in Verse, 2 vols.]
  - Часть первая. 1805. — at Национальная электронная библиотека (НЭБ)
  - Часть вторая. 1806. — at НЭБ
- Опытъ о Русскомъ стихосложеніи. Изданіе второе, значительно пополненное и исправленное. Санктпетербургъ: Морская Типографія, 1817. [A Study of Russian Versification, 2nd ed.] — at НЭБ
- Стихотворенія. Изданиіе исправленное и умноженное. Санктпетербургъ: Типографія Императорской Россійской Академіи, 1821. [Poems. Revised and enlarged edition] — at Library of Congress = Internet Archive
- Сокращенная Русская грамматика. Санктпетербургъ: Департаментъ народнаго просвѣщенія, 1831. [Shortened Russian Grammar] — at НЭБ (1st ed. 1831), НЭБ (13th ed. 1864)
- Русская грамматика. Санктпетербургъ: И. Глазуновъ, 1831. [Russian Grammar] — at Google Books (1st ed. 1831), НЭБ (6th ed. 1844) = Internet Archive
- (editor) Акты историческіе, относящіеся къ Россіи, извлеченные изъ иностранныхъ архивовъ и библіотекъ = Historica Russiae monumenta, ex antiquis exterarum gentum archivis et bibliothecis deprompta. Санктпетербургъ: Эдуардъ Працъ. [Monuments of Russian History, Obtained from Foreign Archives and Libraries, 2 vols.]
  - Томъ 1. 1841. — at HathiTrust
  - Томъ 2. 1842. — at HathiTrust
- Описаніе Руссихъ и Словенскихъ рукописей Румянцовскаго Музеума. Санктпетербургъ: Имп. Акад. Наукъ, 1842. [A Description of Russian and Slavic Manuscripts of Rumyantsov Collection] — at Google Books, Internet Archive
- (editor) Остромирово Евангеліе 1056 – 57 года. Санктпетербургъ: Императорская Академія Наукъ, 1843. [Ostromir Gospels from 1056–1057] — at Internet Archive
- (co-editor) Словарь Церковно-Славянскао и Русскаго языка. Санктпетербургъ: Имп. Акад. Наукъ, 1847. [Dictionary of Church Slavonic and Russian Language, 4 vols.]
- (editor) Опытъ областнаго Великорусскаго Словаря. Санктпетербургъ: Имп. Акад. Наукъ, 1852. [A Regional Great Russian Dictionary] — at НЭБ
- (editor) Дополненіе къ Опыту областнаго Великорусскаго Словаря. Санктпетербургъ: Имп. Акад. Наукъ, 1858. [Addendum to the Regional Great Russian Dictionary] — at НЭБ
- Словарь Церковно-Славянскаго языка. Санктпетербургъ: Имп. Акад. Наукъ. [Dictionary of Church Slavonic Language, 2 vols.]
  - Томъ первый: А–Н. 1858. — at Internet Archive
  - Томъ второй: О–Ѩ. 1861. — at Internet Archive
- Грамматика Церковно-Словенскаго языка : изложенная по древнѣйшимъ онаго памятникамъ. Санктпетербургъ: Имп. Акад. Наукъ, 1863. [Grammar of Church Slavonic Language : Described on the Basis of its Oldest Monuments] — at Library of Congress = Internet Archive
- Филологическія наблюденія. Издалъ [...] И. Срезневскій. Санктпетербургъ: Имп. Акад. Наукъ, 1865. [Philological Studies. Edited by Izmail Sreznevsky] — at Library of Congress = Internet Archive
- Стихотворения. Ред. Вл. Орлова. Москва: Советский писатель, 1935. [Poems. Edited by Vladimir Orlov]

=== Articles (selection) ===
- Задача любителямъ Этимологіи, in: Санктпетербургскій вѣстникъ, февраль 1812. No. 2, pp. 204–215. Санктпетербургъ: Морская Типографія. [A Task for the Enthusiasts of Etymology] — at НЭБ
- Разсужденіе о Славянскомъ языкѣ, in: Труды Общества любителей Россійской словесности, ч. 17, pp. 5–61. Москва: Университетская Типографія, 1820. [A Discourse Upon the Slavic Language] — at Google Books, also reprinted in Филологическія наблюденія (1865)
- Грамматическія объясненія на три статьи Фрейзингенской рукописи, in: Собраніе Словенскихъ памятниковъ, находящихся внѣ Россіи. Книга 1^{я}: Памятники собранные в Германіи, составлено Петромъ Кеппеномъ, pp. 21–86. Санктпетербургъ: Императорскій Воспитательный Домъ, 1827. [Grammatical Explanations of the Three Parts of Freising Manuscripts] — at Google Books, also reprinted in Филологическія наблюденія (1865)

A complete bibliography of Vostokov's philological works was published by Sreznevsky in the Филологическія наблюденія (1865).
