= Putyata =

Russian military officer

Putyata (Russian: Путята) was a tysyatsky (chiliarch) of Vladimir the Great whose name is mentioned in the Ioachim Chronicle. According to the chronicle, he forced the Novgorodians into accepting Christianity along with Dobrynya. An old proverb says: "Putyata baptized by fire, and Dobrynya by sword", or "Putyata baptized by sword, and Dobrynya by fire" (Russian: Путята крестил мечом, а Добрыня огнём, romanized: Putyata krestil mechom, a Dobrynya ognyom), which attributes the houses being set on fire to Dobrynya.

== Bibliography ==
- "Путята, тысяцкий" . Brockhaus and Efron Encyclopedic Dictionary (in Russian). 1906.
