= Sermon on Law and Grace =

One of the earliest known Slavonic texts

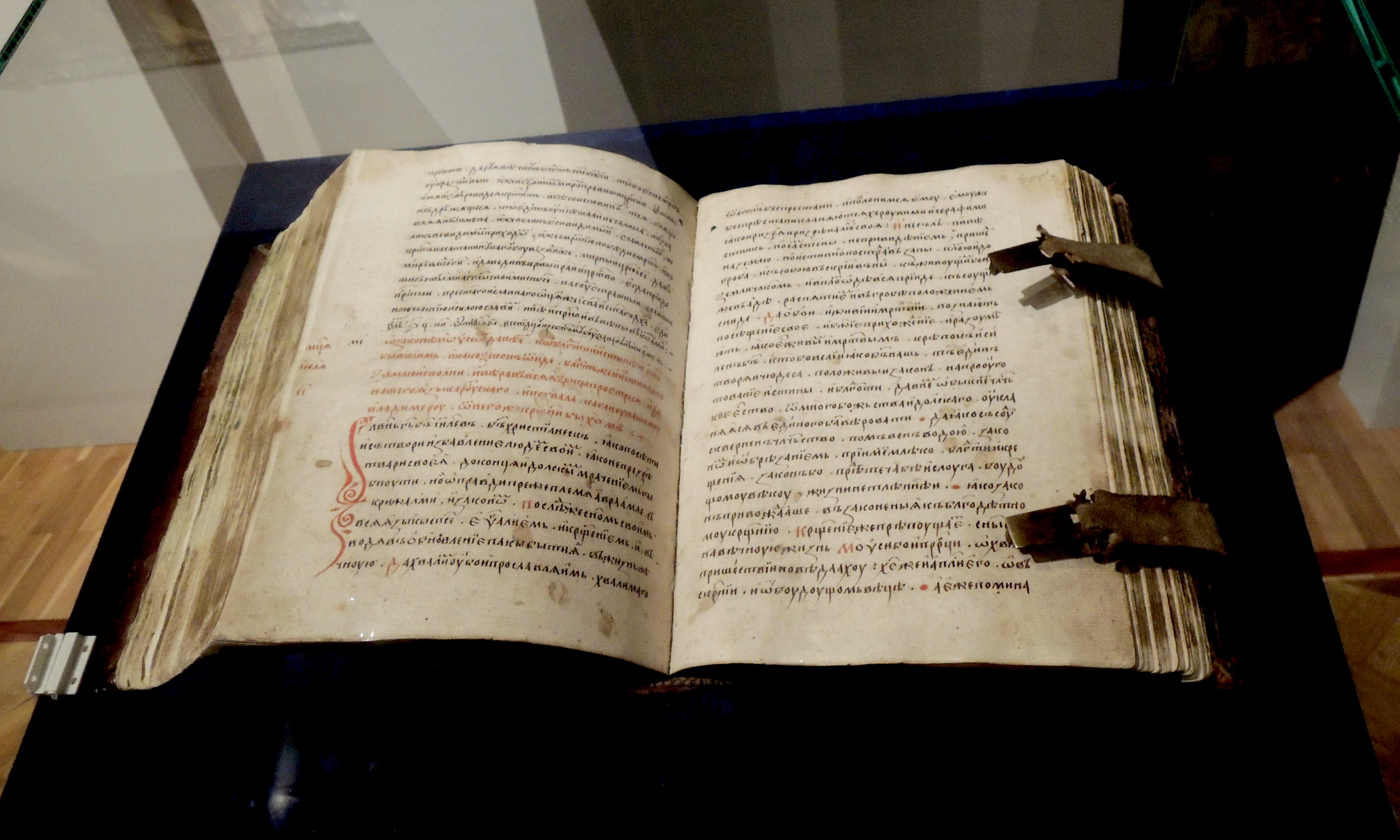

The Sermon on Law and Grace (Church Slavonic: Слово о законѣ и благодѣти, romanized: Slovo o zakoně i blagoděti) is a sermon written by Hilarion, the metropolitan of Kiev. It is one of the earliest Slavonic texts available, having been written several decades before the Primary Chronicle. Since Hilarion was considered to be a writer worthy of imitation, this sermon was very influential in the further development of both the style and content of literature in Kievan Rus'.

The Sermon was an important event to be mentioned in the Primary Chronicle, and by matching against other events from the Chronicle it was concluded that the Sermon was written somewhere between 1037 and 1050.

== Title ==
Although commonly called the Sermon on Law and Grace, the work bears a much longer title:

Concerning: the Law given by Moses and the Grace and Truth which came by Jesus Christ. And: how the Law departed, and Grace and Truth filled all the earth, and Faith spread forth to all nations, even unto our nation of Rus'. And: an encomium to our kagan Volodimer, by whom we were baptized. And: a prayer to God from all our land.
Church Slavonic: О законѣ мωѵсѣомъ данѣѣмъ, и ω благодѣти и истинѣ исоусомъ христъмъ бывшϊи. И како законъ ѿтиде, благодѣть же и истина всю землю исполни, и вѣра въ всѧ ꙗзыкы простреся и до нашего ꙗзыка роускаго, и похвала каганоу нашемоу влодимероу, ѿ негоже крещени быхомъ и молитва къ богѫ ѿ всеа зьмлѧ нашеа

== Summary ==
The sermon is divided into two distinct parts.

The first part presents the Grace of the New Testament surpassing and replacing the Law of the Old Testament. Hilarion retells the Old Testament account of Hagar, the handmaiden of Abraham, and Sarah, his wife. He likens Isaac, "the free son of a free mother", to the followers of Christianity, and Ishmael, "a servant (not a truly free man)", to the Jews. Hilarion emphasizes that the Law came first, and then came Grace, just as Ishmael came before Isaac. He then explains that the Gospel now spreads over the whole earth, while the "lake of the Law" has dried up.

The second part serves as a eulogy to Vladimir, the grand prince of Kiev, and baptizer of Rus'. It is written in a highly rhetorical panegyric, possibly for the purpose of presenting Vladimir as a candidate for canonization.

== Audience ==
While the sermon was most likely composed for the Christian elite of Kievan Rus' and given at the St. Sophia Cathedral in Kiev, scholars are still uncertain of many details pertaining to the presentation of the sermon. Russian philologist Aleksander Uzhankov considers that The Sermon on Law and Grace was pronounced in the evening of 25 March 1038, in the Church of the Annunciation of the Blessed Virgin Mary at the Golden Gate in Kiev, Some scholars suggest that the two parts of the sermon were presented on different occasions and were brought together only during later compilation.

== Bibliography ==
- Franklin, Simon (1991). "Ilarion's "Sermon on Law and Grace"". Sermons and Rhetoric of Kievan Rus' (PDF). University of Toronto (SLA 218 Ukrainian Literature and Culture). p. 30. Archived from the original (PDF) on 15 March 2023.
