= Ostromir Gospels =

Oldest dated book of Kievan Rus'

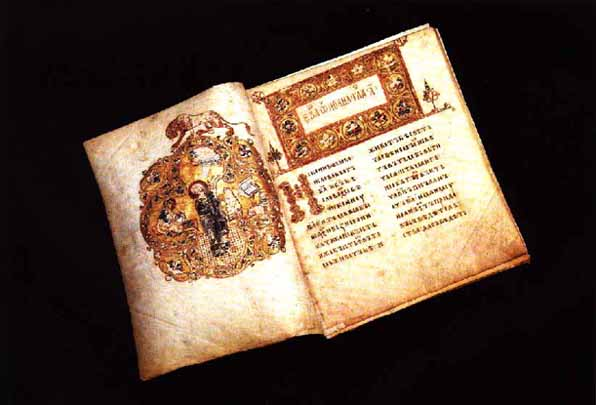
The Ostromir Gospels, written in Church Slavonic with many spellings reflecting the East Slavic (Old Russian) recension, are famous for its brilliant miniatures. The opening of the Gospel of Saint John, with his Evangelist portrait.

The Ostromir Gospels (Russian: Остромирово Евангелие; also known as the Ostromir Gospel or the Ostromir Lectionary) are the oldest dated book of Kievan Rus' and the oldest dated Russian manuscript. Archaeologists have dated the Novgorod Codex, a wax writing tablet with excerpts from the Psalms, discovered in 2000, to an earlier time range, but unlike the Ostromir Gospels, it does not contain an explicit date. The book is currently held in the National Library of Russia.

The Ostromir Gospels were created in 1056 or 1057 (the year 6564 in the Byzantine calendar) by the deacon Gregory (Григории, Grigorii) for his patron Ostromir, the posadnik of Novgorod, probably as a gift for a monastery.

== Description ==
The book is an illuminated manuscript in the form of a Gospel lectionary containing only feast-day and Sunday readings. It is written in a large uncial hand in two columns on 294 parchment sheets of the size 20 x 24 cm. Each page contains eighteen lines. The book is concluded by the scribe's notice about the circumstances of its creation.

Three full page evangelist portraits survive, by two different artists, and many pages have decorative elements. The close resemblance between this and the equivalent pages in the Mstislav Gospel suggests they are both based on a common prototype, now lost. The two artists who produced the evangelist portraits were both heavily influenced by Byzantine models, but the style of the portraits of Saints Mark and Luke seems to derive from Byzantine enamelled plaques rather than manuscripts.

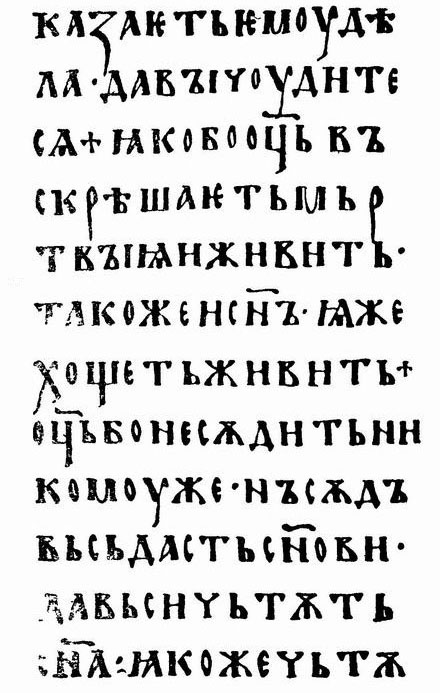
The Ostromir Gospels

More early Russian manuscripts have survived from Novgorod, which was never occupied by the Mongols, than any other center. Like other medieval Russian manuscripts, the Ostromir Gospels are written in the local version of Church Slavonic. As a result, the book shows Old Russian phonological features. It is the earliest dated manuscript to contain Russian elements and it marks the beginning of Russianized Church Slavonic, which would gradually spread to liturgical, ecclesiastical and chancery texts. For example, the word "водоу" ('water') is found rather than the correct Old Church Slavonic accusative form "водѫ", and the word "дрѫже" ('friend') is found rather than "дроуже" in the vocative form, showing that the scribe could not differentiate the sounds represented by Old Church Slavonic ⟨оу⟩ and ⟨ѫ⟩ anymore.

== Later history ==
It is thought that the book was taken from one of Novgorod's monasteries to the personal collection of the Russian tsars in the Moscow Kremlin, where it was first registered in 1701. Peter the Great ordered that it be taken to St. Petersburg, where there was no mention of it until 1805, when it was discovered in the dressing room of the late Catherine the Great.

The Gospels were deposited in the Imperial Public Library in St Petersburg, where it remains. Alexander Vostokov was the first to study it in depth, demonstrating that it was written in the archaic literary language of Kievan Rus', with features reflecting the Russian recension of Old Slavonic. The first edition was published under Vostokov's supervision in 1843.

In 1932, the gem-studded book-cover induced a plumber to break into a case, remove and steal the binding, and hide the parchments behind a bookcase. Although the book was quickly recovered, no replacement binding has been provided to date.

== Editions and scans ==
- Alexander Vostokov (А. Востоковъ): Остромирово Евангеліе 1056 – 57 года. Съ приложеніемъ греческаго текста Евангелій и съ грамматическими объясненіями [Ostromir Gospels of 1056–1057. With the Greek text of the Gospels and grammatical explanations]. Санктпетербургъ: Императорская Академія Наукъ, 1843. — Internet Archive
- Ilya Savnikov (Илья Савниковъ): Остромирово Евангеліе 1056-57 г. (Второе) фотолитогафическое изданіе. [Ostromir Gospels of 1056–1057. (Second) Photolithographic Edition] С.-Петербургъ: Фото-Литографія А. Ф. Маркова, 1889. — НЭБ
- Остромирово Евангелие. Ленинград: Аврора, 1988. (facsimile with a supplementary booklet with commentary)
- Остромирово евангелие 1056—1057 года по изданию А. Х. Востокова. Москва: Языки славянских культур, 2007. (reprint of Vostokov's edition with corrections by E. E. Shevchenko)
- Scan at Presidential Library
- Scan at National Library of Russia (older version, with supplementary essays)

== Sources ==
- Cubberley, Paul (17 October 2002). Russian: A Linguistic Introduction. Cambridge University Press. p. 44. ISBN 978-0-521-79641-5.
- Kaliganov, Igor I. (2020). "The Ostromir Gospel: the oldest dated handwritten book of the Eastern Slavs". Materials for the virtual Museum of Slavic Cultures (2): 122–126. doi:10.31168/0440-4.20.
- Matthews, William Kleesman (August 2013). The Structure and Development of Russian. Cambridge University Press. ISBN 978-1-107-61939-5.
- Popova, Olga (1984). Russian illuminated manuscripts of the 11th to the early 16th centuries. Aurora.
- Sussex, Roland; Cubberley, Paul (2006). The Slavic languages. Cambridge: Cambridge University Press. ISBN 978-0-521-22315-7.
- Terras, Victor (1 January 1985). Handbook of Russian Literature. Yale University Press. ISBN 978-0-300-04868-1.
- Vinokur, Grigory O. (2 April 1971). The Russian Language: A Brief History. Cambridge University Press. ISBN 978-0-521-07944-0.
