= Hilarion of Kiev =

First non-Greek Metropolitan of Kyiv

Hierarch Hilarion of Kiev
- Metropolitan of Kiev and all Rus'
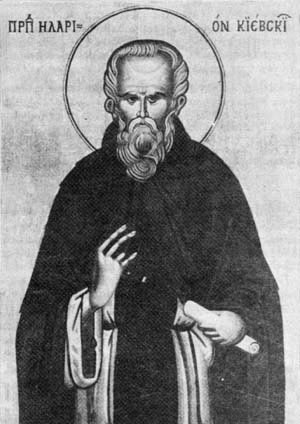
- Icon of Saint Hilarion, Metropolitan of Kiev, 11th century
- Church: Ecumenical Patriarchate of Constantinople
- Metropolis: Metropolis of Kiev and all Rus'
- See: Kiev
- In office: 1051–1052 or 1054

Orders
- Ordination: by Hieromonk of St. Apostle Church (Berestove)

Hilarion or Ilarion (Note: Russian: Иларион; Ukrainian: Іларіон; Belarusian: Іларыён) was the first non-Greek Metropolitan of Kiev and all Rus'. He held the metropolitan post before or during the ongoing 11th century East–West Schism. While there is not much verifiable information regarding Hilarion's biography, there are several aspects of his life which have come to be generally accepted.

== Biography ==
According to the Primary Chronicle Hilarion served as a presbyter in a princely residence of Berestove (today in Kiev). He acquired the reputation of well-educated scholar and upon the death of Metropolitan Theopemptus in 1049, Hilarion was proclaimed the metropolitan of Kiev by council of local bishops on proposition of the Grand prince of Kiev Yaroslav the Wise who thus challenged the old Byzantine tradition of placing Greeks on the episcopal sees. Hilarion was not appointed by the Ecumenical Patriarch Michael I Cerularius.

Hilarion's appointment met with stiff opposition from Luka Zhidiata, Bishop of Novgorod (r. 1035–1060). Zhidyata openly opposed probably because it was the prerogative of the Patriarch of Constantinople to appoint the Kievan metropolitan and thus Hilarion's appointment was uncanonical. For his opposition, Luka was confined in the Kievan Caves Monastery for three years until his death, at which time his remains were taken back to Novgorod and buried in the Cathedral of Holy Wisdom there.

It appears as though Hilarion did not serve an extended term as the Kievan metropolitan, as some chronicles began mentioning Metropolitan Yefrem in 1055. Nevertheless, Hilarion remains the best known of all the ancient Kievan metropolitans, not only because he was the first native to ascend to that position, but also because of his writings.

Hilarion is credited as the author of four works:

- Sermon on Law and Grace,
- Confession of Faith
- Sermon on Spiritual Benefit to All Christians
- a short collection of instructions for priests called "Слово к брату столпнику" (A word to brother stylites)

In 1920s Russian historian Mikhail Prisyolkov introduced a theory according to which Hilarion became a monk under a name of Nikon and settled in Kiev Cave Monastery. He supposedly is the same Nikon who compiled the so-called 1073 Caves Chronicles. Other archaeographers, such as Aleksey Shakhmatov, conjecture that Hilarion was one of compilers of the Ancient Chronicle Manuscript at the courtship of Yaroslav the Wise in 1030s.

== See also ==
- East–West Schism

== Notes ==
Preceded by Theopemptus of Kiev	Metropolitan of Kiev and All-Rus'; 1051–1055	Succeeded by Ephraim I of Kiev
