= Kiev uprising (1018) =

Event in 1018

Kiev uprising of 1018
- Part of Bolesław I's intervention in the Kievan succession crisis of 1015–1019
| Date | 1018 |
| Location | Kiev, Kievan Rus' (Modern day Ukraine) |
| Result | Disputed |
| Territorial changes | Polish forces expelled from the main territory of Rus' |

Belligerents
| Kievan Rus' | Duchy of Poland |

Commanders and leaders
| Sviatopolk I of Kiev | Bolesław I the Brave |

The Kiev uprising (Russian: Киевское восстание; Polish: Powstanie Kijowskie; Ukrainian: Київське повстання) was a revolt by the inhabitants of Kiev (modern Kyiv) and nearby cities, to remove the Polish occupying force of Bolesław I the Brave from their territories. It was reportedly provoked when Bolesław (Boleslav) did not transfer to Sviatopolk I of Kiev his right to the throne of Kiev, but instead installed Polish garrisons. The uprising is disputed by Polish historians, as it is not mentioned in the Chronicon of Thietmar of Merseburg, although it does appear in the Russian Primary Chronicle.

Svyatopolk ordered his forces to kill the Polish garrisons during the uprising, but Bolesław evacuated in time with some wealth from the city which saved his life. Although Bolesław saved himself and saved the bulk of his army, almost all the soldiers from those who remained garrisoned in the cities were killed.

When Yaroslav learned about the withdrawal of the Polish forces from Kiev, he gathered the squad again and led it to the city, Polish sources report that Yaroslav chased them, however, this is unlikely, because he was preparing to march on Kiev to give a general battle, which became the Battle of the Alta River (1019).

== Uncertainty over events ==
The Primary Chronicle alleges that as the result of Polish plundering, Sviatopolk ordered: "that any Lyakhs [i.e. Poles] found in the city should be killed". The resulting unrest, according to the Primary Chronicle, forced Bolesław to leave Kiev, whereupon Sviatopolk was left to fend for himself.

This turn of events is omitted in the only contemporary source, which is Thietmar of Merseburg's Chronicon Thietmari. Thietmar's chronicle of the expedition, which is written in a part of the Chronicon not devoted to the expedition, recounts that Duke Boleslav invaded the Russian king's realm with his army, where he says:

... and that after placing his long-exiled brother-in-law, the Russian's brother, on the throne, he returned in high spirits. (Note: According to Gallus Anonymus, after a ten-month stay in the Ruthenian capital. The chronicler states that Bolesław feared for the fate of his son Mieszko, who ruled the country in his father's stead. It seems a chronicler's exaggeration to say that the twenty-eight-year-old Mieszko was incapable of ruling.)

According to Thietmar, Bolesław asked Yaroslav the Wise to return his daughter who he had taken prisoner. When Yaroslav refused, Bolesław took members of Yaroslav's family back to Poland as prisoners as he returned home in September. His captives included Vladimir's widow and Yaroslav's sister, Predslava, whose hand Bolesław had earlier sought. Having been rebuffed, Bolesław took her as a concubine. The Bolesław also took commoners as well as much of the treasury of Kiev. Among the notable commoners was the venerated Saint Moses the Hungarian.

In the past, some historians (such as Zhylenko and Kostomarov) have conjectured that Bolesław decided to rule the Kievan lands himself, though Bolesław had no power base there and no Rurikid blood. Bolesław's main motivation, according to modern historians, was to regain the Cherven Towns for his patrimony, while at the same time aiding his kinsman, to whom he had an obligation. The expedition also furnished an occasion to enrich his followers from Kiev's wealth.

Soon after his arrival, Bolesław sent a large force to quarter in Kiev and in nearby towns, forcing Kievans to sustain them, and collected significant tributes that he divided among his allies. It was chronicled by Thietmar that before departing, Bolesław:

.... was shown an unspeakable amount of treasure, most of which he distributed among his friends and supporters.

On many subsequent occasions during the Kievan period, the rulers of Poland, as well as Hungarians or Pechenegs, were paid to intervene in Kievan succession disputes; in the case of Bolesław II, the Polish monarch took the money without making any expedition.

== Bibliography ==
=== Primary sources ===
- Primary Chronicle (c. 1110s).
  - Cross, Samuel Hazzard; Sherbowitz-Wetzor, Olgerd P. (1953). The Russian Primary Chronicle, Laurentian Text. Translated and edited by Samuel Hazzard Cross and Olgerd P. Sherbowitz-Wetzor (PDF). Cambridge, Massachusetts: The Mediaeval Academy of America. p. 325. (First edition published in 1930. The first 50 pages are a scholarly introduction.)
  - Ostrowski, Donald; Birnbaum, David J. (7 December 2014). "Rus' primary chronicle critical edition – Interlinear line-level collation". pvl.obdurodon.org (in Church Slavic). Archived from the original on 28 April 2025.
- Thietmar of Merseburg, Chronicon Thietmari (1018).
  - Warner, David A., ed. (2001). Ottonian Germany: The Chronicon of Thietmar of Merseburg. Manchester Medieval Sources Series. Manchester & New York: Manchester University Press. ISBN 0-7190-4926-1.
- Gallus Anonymus, Gesta principum Polonorum (c. 1118).

=== Scholarly literature ===
- Franklin, Simon; Shepard, Jonathan (1996). The Emergence of Rus, 750–1200. Longman History of Russia. London & New York: Longman. ISBN 0-582-49091-X.
- Gumilev, Lev (2023) [1992]. От Руси к России [For Rus' to Russia]. Эксклюзивная классика (revised ed.). Moscow: AST. ISBN 978-5-17-153845-3.
- Grekov, Boris (1882–1953), "Kievskaya Rus'", AST, 2004, ISBN 5-17-025449-0 (in Russian)
- Jaworski, Rafał, Wyprawa Kijowska Chrobrego Chwała Oręża Polskiego Nr 2. Rzeczpospolita and Mówią Wieki. 5 August 2006 (in Polish).
- Karamzin, Nikolay (2020) [1824]. История Государства Российского [History of the Russian state]. Азбука. ISBN 978-5-4484-4482-1.
- Müller, Ludolf (2005). "Studien zur altrussischen Legende der Heiligen Boris und Gleb (6): III. Die Quellen der Chronikerzählung: 2. Die Erzählung über die Schlacht bei Ljubeč". Zeitschrift für Slavische Philologie (in German). 64 (2). Universitätsverlag WINTER Gmbh: 245–278. ISSN 0044-3492. JSTOR 24003950.
- Ryzhov, Konstantin (1998). Все монархи мира. Россия: 600 кратких жизнеописаний [All monarchs of the world: Russia: 600 short biographies] (in Russian). Moscow: Veche Publishers. ISBN 5-7838-0268-9. LCCN 98160491.
- Solovyov, Sergey (1879). История России с древнейших времён [The history of Russia since ancient times] (in Russian). Chapter VII.
