= Battle of the Alta River (1019) =

- Part of the Kievan succession crisis of 1015–1019
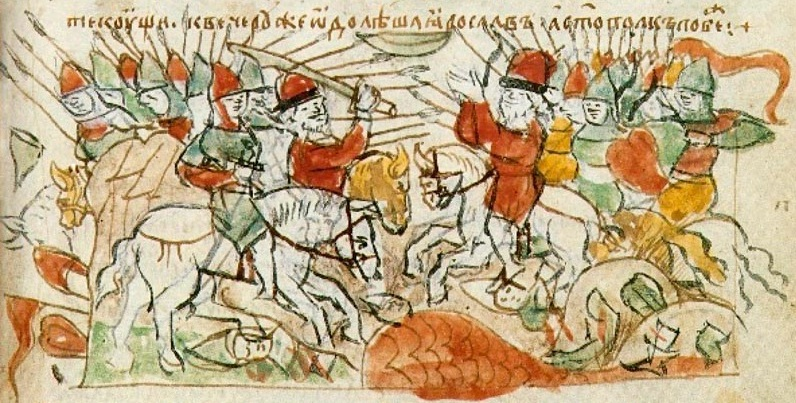
- Battle of the Alta River (1019). Miniature in the Radziwiłł Chronicle (15th century).
Date	24 July 1019
Location	Alta river
Result	Yaroslav's victory

Belligerents
Kievan Rus' loyal to Sviatopolk I	Kievan Rus' loyal to Yaroslav I

Commanders and leaders
Sviatopolk I	Yaroslav I

The Battle of the Alta River was a battle that took place on 24 July 1019 between the troops of the Novgorodian prince Yaroslav "the Wise" Volodimerovich and the army of his brother, prince Sviatopolk I of Kiev, who was supported by the Pechenegs. It was part of the Kievan succession crisis of 1015–1019.

== Background ==
After the death of prince Volodimer I Sviatoslavich "the Great" in 1015, a fierce struggle for the Kievan throne broke out between his sons. Initially, the eldest son Sviatopolk succeeded him as prince, and managed to eliminate several brothers who apparently competed for the succession, including Boris and Gleb. But he was opposed by Yaroslav, who reigned in Novgorod under Volodimer. In the battle of Liubech (Lyubeč) in 1016, Yaroslav's troops defeated the supporters of the Kievan prince, who then fled to the possessions of his father-in-law, the Polish king Bolesław the Brave. In 1018, Bolesław defeated Yaroslav at the Western Bug, and having reached Kiev, restored his son-in-law to the throne. Yaroslav fled to Novgorod and even tried to flee further to Sweden, but was detained by the Novgorodians, who helped him gather a new army, with which Prince Yaroslav again moved on Kiev after Bolesław had returned to Poland.

== Course of the battle ==
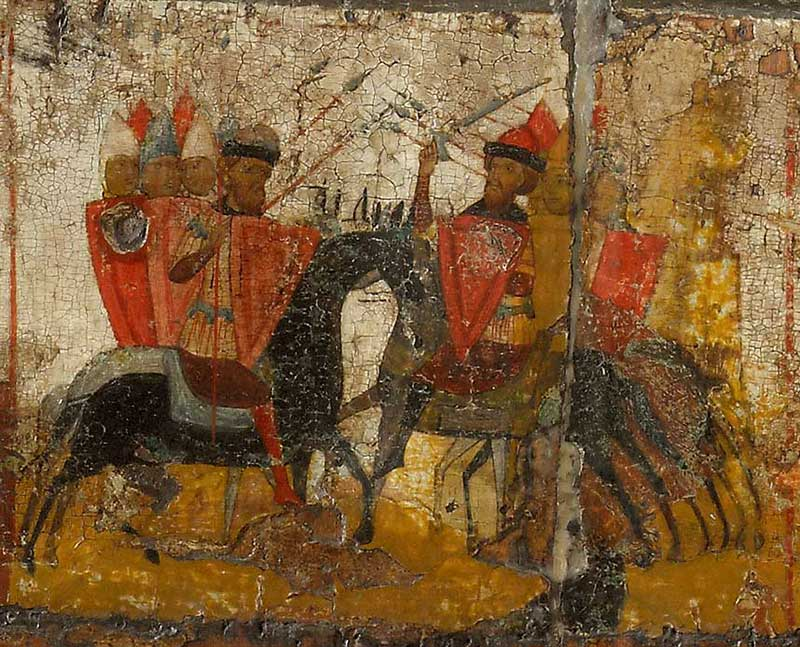
Battle of Svyatopolk and Yaroslav (Muscovite icon, 14th century)

Written about 100 years after the event, the Primary Chronicle (PVL) claims the combat happened at the Alta river, at the site where Boris was allegedly killed by Sviatopolk's assassins four years earlier. It provided the following account of the battle:

[T]he two armies attacked, and the plain of the Al'ta was covered with the multitudinous soldiery of both forces. It was then Friday. As the sun rose, they met in battle, and the carnage was terrible, such as had never before occurred in Rus'. The soldiers fought hand to hand and slaughtered each other. Three times they clashed, so that the blood flowed in the valley. Toward evening Yaroslav conquered, and Svyatopolk fled.

— Primary Chronicle, translation Cross & Sherbowitz-Wetzor (1953)

== Aftermath ==
The Battle of Alta decided the outcome of the fierce and intense struggle for power between the brothers Yaroslav and Sviatopolk. After suffering a heavy defeat, Sviatopolk reportedly withdrew westward in fear, imagining being chased all the time, even when no one was following him anymore. Using religiously loaded Christian literary devices, the Primary Chronicle claims Sviatopolk was like Cain who killed Abel in Genesis 4 for his fratricide of Boris, Gleb and Sviatoslav the Derevlian, but now defeated and haunted by the devil, and ascribes to him a stressful and painful death somewhere between Czechia (Bohemia) and Lyakh (Poland).

Yaroslav the Wise finally became the uncontested supreme ruler of Kievan Rus'. However, it would be only five more years when another brother, Mstislav of Chernigov, challenged Yaroslav and fought him to a draw at the Battle of Listven (1024).

== Bibliography ==
=== Primary sources ===
- Cross, Samuel Hazzard; Sherbowitz-Wetzor, Olgerd P. (1953). The Russian Primary Chronicle, Laurentian Text. Translated and edited by Samuel Hazzard Cross and Olgerd P. Sherbowitz-Wetzor (PDF). Cambridge, Massachusetts: The Mediaeval Academy of America. p. 325. (First edition published in 1930. The first 50 pages are a scholarly introduction.)
- Thuis, Hans (2015). Nestorkroniek. De oudste geschiedenis van het Kievse Rijk (in Dutch). Nijmegen: Uitgeverij Vantilt. p. 304. ISBN 9789460042287.

=== Scholarly literature ===
- Martin, Janet (2007). Medieval Russia: 980–1584. Second Edition. E-book. Cambridge: Cambridge University Press. ISBN 978-0-511-36800-4.
