= Kievan succession crisis of 1015–1019 =

War of succession in Kievan Rus'

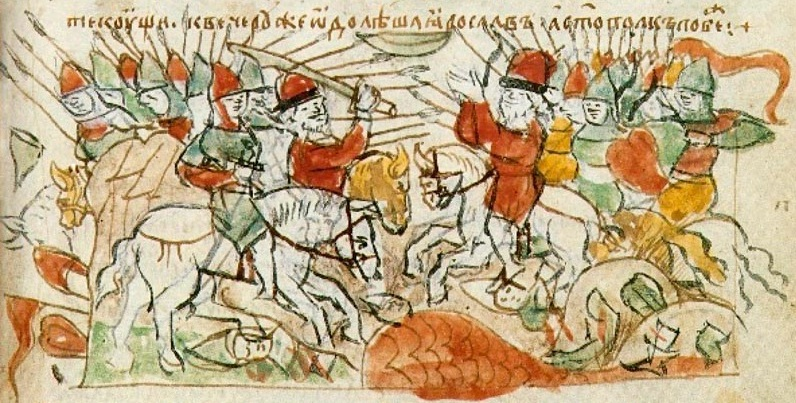
- Battle of the Alta River (1019). Miniature in the Radziwiłł Chronicle (15th century).
Date	1015 – 1019
Location	Kievan Rus'
Result	Victory for Yaroslav
Territorial changes	Polish annexation of the Cherven Cities

Belligerents
Svyatopolk of Turov Duchy of Poland (1018)	Yaroslav of Novgorod	Other brothers with their druzhinas

Commanders and leaders
Svyatopolk of Turov Bolesław I (1018)	Yaroslav of Novgorod	Boris of Rostov † Gleb of Murom † Sviatoslav of Dereva †

The Kievan succession crisis of 1015–1019, also known as the Feud of the Volodimerovichi (Note: Ukrainian: Усо́биця Володи́мировичів, romanized: Usóbytsya Volodýmyrovychiv.) or the Internecine war in Rus', (Note: Russian: Междоусобная война на Руси, romanized: Mezhdousobnaja vojna na Rusi.) was a war of succession in Kievan Rus' caused by the death of Volodimer I of Kiev in 1015. Several of his sons claimed the throne, and began fighting and killing each other, until eventually Yaroslav emerged victorious in 1019.

The events of the dynastic crisis are reflected in Rus' sources (chronicles and works of the Boris and Gleb cycle; see The Tale of Boris and Gleb in the Primary Chronicle), and in the chronicles of the Polish Gallus Anonymus and German Thietmar of Merseburg. The later Old Norse saga of Eymundar þáttr hrings also retains echoes of these events. An analysis of all available sources shows a rather contradictory picture, and there is no consensus among researchers on the course of the events of the war.

== Background ==
The conflict was rooted in the fact that prince Volodimer I had many sons who could claim Kiev after their father's death.

Sviatopolk of Turov

The Prince of Turov, Sviatopolk, was the eldest son of Volodimer; although according to other sources, Sviatopolk was Volodimer's nephew, the son of his elder brother of Yaropolk I of Kiev. In 1013, Sviatopolk was imprisoned by Volodimer on suspicion of attempting to seize the Kievan throne with the help of Polish duke Bolesław I the Brave, whose daughter (her name has not been preserved) Sviatopolk married in 1009. According to Thietmar of Merseburg, Sviatopolk's wife, son and Reinbern (former bishop of Kolberg, modern Kołobrzeg) were also imprisoned; the latter reportedly died in captivity. In response to Sviatopolk's arrest, Bolesław I set out on a campaign against Rus', enlisting the support of the Pechenegs. Volodimer was forced to release Sviatopolk together with the daughter of Bolesław I.

Yaroslav of Novgorod

In 1014, another son of Volodimer I, Yaroslav (since the 19th century dubbed Yaroslav "the Wise", although historical sources only called his wife Ingegerd "wise"), who reigned in Veliky Novgorod, refused to send tribute to Kiev; thus, a war was brewing between Kiev and Novgorod. To campaign against Kiev, Yaroslav hired some Varangians, whose behaviour caused an uprising of the people of Novgorod, which Yaroslav brutally suppressed. Meanwhile, in Kiev, while preparing for a campaign against his rebellious son Yaroslav, prince Volodimer I fell ill and died on 15 July 1015.

Boris of Rostov

According to the Primary Chronicle, which contains a hagiographic account favouring Boris and Gleb, Volodimer's favourite son at the time was Boris (Borys), prince of Rostov, who was with the army in a campaign against the Pechenegs. Despite these mentions that Volodimer singled out Boris among his sons, there are no direct indications that Boris was to become the main heir. The Primary Chronicle does suggest that the druzhina of Boris urged him to seize the capital upon Volodimer's death, although Boris allegedly refused to stand up to his half-brother Sviatoslav. The Eymund Saga narratives that the kingdom of Jarisleifr (Yaroslav) was invaded by a certain Burizleifr, although it is unclear whether this was Boris or perhaps Bolesław, Sviatopolk's father-in-law.

Gleb of Murom and Sviatoslav of Dereva

After Boris was killed by Sviatopolk's men, the Primary Chronicle also relates they killed Gleb of Murom and Sviatoslav of Dereva, two other sons of Volodimer. Although neither appears to have made a claim to the throne, Sviatopolk had them killed as potential rivals. While Gleb gets a similar (but shorter) hagiographic treatment as Boris, piously awaiting his death while praying to God, Sviatoslav is only mentioned in passing as being killed while fleeing to Hungary, and has not been framed as a saint who suffered martyrdom at the hands of Sviatopolk's assassins.

== 1015: opening moves ==
=== Boris and Gleb in the Primary Chronicle ===
The Primary Chronicle (PVL), the most frequently cited, but not the most reliable source about the conflict, was written about 100 years later in the 1110s, possibly commissioned by Yaroslav's descendants. It favours Yaroslav's side, and nicknamed Sviatopolk as "the Accursed", thereby indicating a clear bias. The PVL reports that Sviatopolk seized the throne, taking advantage of the absence of other brothers in Kiev. It also attributes to him the intention to destroy his competing relatives, ordering his soldiers to kill other sons of Volodimer'.

Upon his father's death, Svyatopolk settled in Kiev, and after calling together all the inhabitants of Kiev, he began to distribute largess among them. They accepted it, but their hearts were not with him, because their brethren were with Boris. (...) But Svyatopolk was filled with lawlessness. Adopting the device of Cain he sent messages to Boris that he desired to live at peace with him (...). But he plotted against him now how he might kill him.

— Primary Chronicle, column 132.

Sviatopolk had reason to worry: the Kievan druzhina, who had returned from Boris's unsuccessful campaign against the Pechenegs, was urging Boris to seize Kiev by force. Boris allegedly refused: "Be it not for me to raise my hand against my elder brother. Now that my father has passed away, let him take the place of my father in my heart." Soon, Boris was killed at the hands of assassins sent by Sviatopolk. The latter then sent messages to his other brother Gleb (Hlib) to come to Kiev to see his ill father. Shortly thereafter, Prince Gleb Volodimerovich of Murom was killed by Sviatopolk's men. Curiously, neither Boris nor Gleb resisted their fate, but accepted their death as an imitation of the Arrest of Jesus at Gethsemane. This narrative later became the basis of the cult of the princely saints Boris and Gleb, which Yaroslav evidently helped to create and spread in order to enhance the reigning clan's legitimacy. (Note: The Kievan Chronicle tells a very similar story of killing of Andrey Bogolyubsky in 1174: 'This saintly portrayal of Andrei is much in line with that of St Boris; in fact, Boris is mentioned numerous times in this account, even to the point of Andrei owning, but not possessing, St Boris's sword at the crucial moment of his murder.') Prince Sviatoslav Volodimerovich the Derevlian tried to escape to Hungary, but was also killed by Sviatoslav's men.

Now the impious and evil Svyatopolk killed Svyatoslav in the Hungarian mountains, after causing him to be pursued as he fled into Hungary. Then he began to reflect how he would kill all his brethren, and rule alone in Rus'.

— Primary Chronicle, column 139.

According to the Primary Chronicle (PVL), Yaroslav was informed about the events in Kiev by his sister Predslava Volodimerovna. In the PVL in columns 135.27–136.1 (version A) and 140.25–141.1 (version B), Predslava informs her brother Yaroslav of their father Volodimer's death. (Note: Predslava Volodimerovna was supposedly also the daughter of Volodimer', but does not call him 'our father' or 'my father', but 'your father' when addressing her brother Yaroslav.) The two passages represent two differing versions of events. In version A, Yaroslav warns Gleb; in version B, Predslava warns Yaroslav. (Note: In both versions, the speaker speaks as though they are not siblings of the addressee by saying 'your father', 'your brother'; rather than 'our father', 'our brother'. This has the effect of putting the perspective of the addressee front and centre, as if the speaker thinks only from the addressee's perspective and not their own, even though all lost a father and a brother.) There are also textual variations between the Laurentian (Lav) and Academic (Aka) manuscripts of version B, which say that Sviatopolk's men were on their way to kill Boris and Gleb, and the Hypatian (Ipa), Khlebnikov (Xle) and Radziwiłł (Rad) manuscripts, which state that Boris had already been killed, and Sviatopolk's men were now on their way to Gleb. (Note: Laurentian (Lav) and Academic (Aka): "Your father has died and Svyatopolk settled in Kyevŭ, having sent [men] to kill Boris and Glěb." Hypatian (Ipa), Khlebnikov (Xle) and Radziwiłł (Rad): "Your father has died and Svyatopolk settled in Kiev. He has killed Boris, and has sent [men] against Gleb.")

=== Origins in the Chronicon Thietmari and the Eymund Saga ===
Rus' sources report that Sviatopolk ordered his brothers to be killed. Some historians believe that they were drawn up under the control of Yaroslav the Wise or his descendants and do not reflect the true facts. The Chronicon Thietmari of contemporary German chronicler Thietmar of Merseburg (died 1 December 1018) does not mention the murders at all. Moreover, he claims that Sviatopolk (Sventipulk) fled to his father-in-law Bolesław (Boleslav) in Poland immediately after the death of Volodimer (Vladimir), while the realm was divided between "his (two) other sons".

King Vladimir died, in the fullness of his days, and left his entire inheritance to his two sons. The third son [Sventipulk] remained in prison, but later escaped and fled to his father-in-law [Boleslav], leaving his wife behind. (...) The king's power was divided among his sons, thereby completely affirming the words of Christ (...): 'Every kingdom divided within itself will be wasted.' [Luke 11:17].

— Chronicon Thietmari, Book 7, chapters 73–74.

The Eymundar þáttr hrings ("Eymund Saga", dated 13th century) claims that Jarizleifr ("Yaroslav") sent his Varangians to capture and blind his brother Burizleifr (possibly meaning "Boris") after Burizleifr had invaded Jarizleifr's kingdom.

...því at þá var ófriðr mikill í Garðaríki, því at Burizleifr, bróðir Jarizleifs konungs, gekk á ríkit. Við hann átti Eymundr fimm bardaga, en í inum síðasta var Burizleifr handtekinn ok blindaðr ok færðr konungi.
"...for there was at this time great discord in Garðaríki, because Burizleif, the brother of King Jarizleif, was making inroads on the kingdom. Against him Eymund fought five battles, and in the last Burizleif was taken captive and blinded and brought to the king."

— Eymundar þáttr hrings. 3. Sætt konunga (3. Truce of Kings).

Sometimes this statement is used to conclude that during the strife Boris supported Sviatopolk, perhaps even bringing the Pechenegs to his aid. On the other hand, other scholars claim that Burizleifr may have been based on duke Bolesław I of Poland instead, and that the Eymund Saga should be considered largely or entirely fictional. It is now impossible to say with complete certainty what really happened, but the evidence of a late and obscure foreign source still hardly outweighs the established version of Rus' chronicles.

== 1016: Battle of Liubech ==
The news of Sviatopolk's accession allegedly came immediately after Yaroslav's suppression of the anti-Varangian revolt of Novgorodians, so the prince was forced to quickly seek peace with Novgorod, whose support he needed in the war with Sviatopolk. The Novgorodians decided to support Yaroslav. The battle between Yaroslav's Varangian–Novgorodian army and the Kievan army took place in autumn 1015 or spring 1016 near the town of Liubech on the river Dnieper. The main textual witnesses of the Primary Chronicle provide conflicting accounts on details (in lines 141.17–142.22) of the Battle of Liubech. The Kievans were defeated and Yaroslav's army of Varangians took over the capital, while Sviatopolk fled to his father-in-law Bolesław I in Poland.

Researchers, based on the reports of Thietmar of Merseburg about Sviatopolk's stay in Poland since Volodimer's death, suggest that one of the other sons of Volodimer' first established himself on the Kievan throne: either Mstislav of Chernigov or Sviatoslav the Derevlian. And it was his army that was defeated at Lyubech. If it was Sviatoslav, then the story of his escape to the West took place after Liubech and his pursuer was not Sviatopolk, but Yaroslav.

== 1017: interlude ==
The PVL is nearly silent about the year 1017 (6525); it only says that "Yaroslav went [to Kiev], and [the] churches burnt down". (Note: "Въ лѣто 6525. Ярославъ въиде въ Киевъ, и погорѣша цьркъви.") It's unclear whether the Chronicle Yaroslav's arrival was causally linked to the churches burning or not, but Thietmar reported that only Saint Sophia Cathedral, Kyiv had suffered severe damage from an accidental fire in 1017. (Note: "When [Boleslav and Sventipolk] arrived [on 14 August 1018], the archbishop of that city received them, at the church of St Sophia (...). In the previous year, this church had been severely, but unintentionally damaged by fire.") Separately, he asserted that Kiev had "more than four hundred churches" at the time.

Sviatopolk did not give up his claim to the throne. His ally in the struggle against Yaroslav was his father-in-law, Boleslav I the Brave. Realising that it was only a matter of time before Bolesław I would use force to support his son-in-law, Yaroslav concluded an agreement against Bolesław I with Holy Roman Emperor Henry II, who had been at war with Poland since July 1015, and he himself moved with his army to Berestia in 1017, simultaneously with Henry II's invasion of Poland. Seeking a way out of the difficult situation, Bolesław I offered Yaroslav peace, which was to be supported by Bolesław I's marriage to Yaroslav's sister Predslava.

== 1018: Bolesław I's intervention ==
Probably, the conditions for peace were the release of Bolesław I's daughter and Sviatopolk's return to the Principality of Turov. Yaroslav rejected this offer. In early 1018, Bolesław I concluded peace with Emperor Henry II on the status quo ante and turned his attention to the east.

In summer 1018, Bolesław I intervened on behalf of his son-in-law Sviatopolk, and their combined troops and the opposing forces of Yaroslav encamped on both sides of the Western Bug (a tributary to the Vistula) near the town of Volyn. (Note: Volyn is a former town in Volhynia in the southern basin of the Western Bug river.) The allies managed to defeat Yaroslav, who fled to Novgorod. The combined forces of Bolesław and Sviatopolk then entered Kiev. According to Thietmar of Merzeburg, on 14 August 1018, Polish Prince Bolesław I triumphantly entered the city.

=== Bolesław and Sviatopolk in Kiev ===
Upon entering Kiev, Bolesław ordered his troops to spread across the Rus' cities in order to gather food for themselves. Sources differ on what happened next; it seems that Bolesław intended to settle down as the new prince of Kiev, rather than to restore Sviatopolk to the throne. (Note: PVL 143.26–27 reports: Болеславъ же бѣ въ Кыевѣ сѣдя "Bolesław was sitting in Kiev," which in Rus' chronicles is typically translated as "Bolesław was reigning (as prince) in Kiev". After Bolesław left, PVL 144.6–7 reports: Святопълкъ же нача къняжити Кыевѣ "Then Sviatopolk began to reign (as prince) / to be prince in Kiev," implying that Bolesław had reigned as prince before him.) According to Thietmar, Bolesław sent envoys from Kiev to German emperor Henry II, thanking him for support during the war, as well as to the Byzantine emperor, notifying him that that he had claimed power in Rus'.

But for reasons that are unclear, Bolesław I soon returned from Kiev to Poland, possibly as early as September 1018, as Thietmar of Merseburg (who died on 1 December 1018) reported Bolesław's return. The Primary Chronicle claims that Sviatopolk ordered the secret killing of the Lyakh (Polish) garrison, causing Bolesław I to evacuate from Kiev in a hurry, taking the property and boyars of Yaroslav and his sisters as hostages with him. Allegedly, Bolesław also took control of the Cherven Cities on his way back to Poland. Thietmar, on the other hand, reports that Bolesław "enthroned his son-in-law" and "returned joyfully" (Latin: hilaris rediit) to Poland. (Note: ...et tunc primo comperit Ruszorum regem, ut sibi per internuncium promisit suum, Bolizlavum peciisse, nilque ibi ad urbem possessam proficisse. Hujus regnum prefatus dux postea cum exercitu invadens, generum suimet et fratrem ejus diu expulsum inthronizavit et hilaris rediit. "...and then he [Boliszlavus] first learned that the king of the Rus', as he [Suentepulcus] had promised Boliszlavus through his messenger, had not made any progress there towards the city he had taken. The aforementioned duke later invaded his kingdom with an army, enthroned his son-in-law [Suentepulcus] and his brother, who had been exiled for a long time, and [Boliszlavus] returned [to Poland] joyfully.") Thietmar's Chronicon contains no reports of Polish troops garrisoning Kiev or other cities that were massacred, nor that Bolesław fled with lots of booty and hostages. According to Ludolf Müller (2005), this should be considered a later literary invention to mirror the events of 1069, about which the Primary Chronicle describes how Bolesław II the Bold took over Kiev after the 1068 popular uprising and was driven out of it again, using a very similar sequence of events and very similar language to the events of 1018.

== 1019: Battle of the Alta River ==
Meanwhile, Yaroslav gathered a new army in Novgorod and fought against Sviatopolk for the second time. Left without Polish support, Sviatopolk fled from Kiev to the Pechenegs. In 1019 Sviatopolk came with a large army of Pechenegs to regain the Kievan throne. In the Battle of the Alta River (1019), that took place at the supposed site where Boris was killed, Yaroslav defeated Sviatopolk and secured the Kievan throne.

== Aftermath ==
Bolesław I did not help his son-in-law, and although he demanded that Yaroslav Volodimerovich return his daughter, information about her disappears. The Primary Chronicle writes about Sviatopolk that he lost his mind and died somewhere 'between Bohemia and Lyakh [Poland]'. Yaroslav the Wise finally became the uncontested supreme ruler of Kievan Rus'. However, it would be only five more years when another brother, Mstislav of Chernigov, challenged Yaroslav and fought him to a draw at the Battle of Listven (1024).

== Bibliography ==
=== Primary sources ===
- Primary Chronicle (c. 1110s).
  - Cross, Samuel Hazzard; Sherbowitz-Wetzor, Olgerd P. (1953). The Russian Primary Chronicle, Laurentian Text. Translated and edited by Samuel Hazzard Cross and Olgerd P. Sherbowitz-Wetzor (PDF). Cambridge, Massachusetts: The Mediaeval Academy of America. p. 325. (First edition published in 1930. The first 50 pages are a scholarly introduction.)
  - Thuis, Hans (2015). Nestorkroniek. De oudste geschiedenis van het Kievse Rijk (in Dutch). Nijmegen: Uitgeverij Vantilt. p. 304. ISBN 9789460042287.
  - Ostrowski, Donald; Birnbaum, David J. (7 December 2014). "Rus' primary chronicle critical edition – Interlinear line-level collation". pvl.obdurodon.org (in Church Slavic). Archived from the original on 28 April 2025.
- Thietmar of Merseburg (1018). Chronicon Thietmari.
  - Warner, David A., ed. (2001). Ottonian Germany: The Chronicon of Thietmar of Merseburg. Manchester Medieval Sources Series. Manchester & New York: Manchester University Press. ISBN 0-7190-4926-1.
- Gallus Anonymus, Gesta principum Polonorum (c. 1118).
- Eymundar þáttr hrings (c. 1250).
  - "Yngvars saga víðförla" (in Old Norse)., Yngvars saga víðförla in Old Norse.
  - Tunstall, Peter (ed.). "The Saga of Yngvar the Traveller". www.northvegr.org. Archived from the original on 20 February 2005., English translation.
- Nestor, Chtenie ("Reading", "Lesson" or "Legend") on the life and murder of Boris and Gleb (late 11th or early 12th century; dating heavily disputed).
  - Abramovych, Dmytro, ed. (1916). "Чтение о Святых Мучениках Борисе и Глебе Chtenie o Svjatykh Muchenykakh Borise i Glebe" [Reading about the Holy Martyrs Boris and Gleb]. Жития святых мучеников Бориса и Глеба, и службы им Zhitija svjatykh muchenikov Borisa i Gleba, i sluzhby im [Lives of the holy martyrs Boris and Gleb, and services to them] (in Russian). Azbuka. (based on the oldest manuscript, the 14th-century Silvestrovskij sbornik)
  - Hollingsworth, Paul (1992). "Lesson on the life of Boris and Glěb". The Hagiography of Kievan Rusʹ. Boston: Harvard Ukrainian Research Institute. pp. 3–32. ISBN 978-0-916458-28-7.
- Anonymus, Skazanie ("Tale") of Boris and Gleb (11th or 12th century; dating heavily disputed).
- Назаренко А. В. Немецкие латиноязычные источники IX—XI веков: Тексты. Перевод. Комментарий. Москва, 1993.
- Щавелева Н. И. Польские латиноязычные средневековые источники: Тексты. Перевод. Комментарий. Москва, 1990.

=== Monographs ===
- Алешковский М. Х. Повесть временных лет: судьба литературного произведения в древней Руси. Москва, 1971.
- Ильин Н. Н. Летописная статья 6523 года и ее источник. Москва, 1957.
- Карпов А. Ярослав Мудрый. Москва, 2001.
- Михеев С. М. «Святополкъ сѣде в Киевѣ по отци»: усобица 1015—1019 годов в древнерусских и скандинавских источниках. Москва, 2009.
- Толочко О. П., Толочко П. П. Київська Русь: Україна крізь віки, т. 4. Київ, 1998.
- Хорошев А. С. Политическая история русской канонизации (XI—XVI вв.). Москва, 1986.
- Martin, Janet (2007). Medieval Russia: 980–1584. Second Edition. E-book. Cambridge: Cambridge University Press. ISBN 978-0-511-36800-4.
- Raffensperger, Christian; Ostrowski, Donald (2023). The Ruling Families of Rus: Clan, Family and Kingdom. London: Reaktion Books. p. 309. ISBN 978-1-78914-745-2. (e-book)

=== Journal articles ===
- Головко О. З історії міжкнязівської війни 1015—1019 рр. на Русі // Україна в Центрально-Східній Європі: Студії з історії XI—XVIII століть, 2000, вип. 1.
- Котляр, М. Ф. Чи Святополк убив Бориса і Гліба? // Український історичний журнал, 1989, No. 12.
- Лященко А. И. «Eymundar Saga» и русские летописи // Известия АН СССР: Серия VI, 1926, т. 20, No. 12.
- Мельникова Е. А. Был ли Ярослав убийцей своего брата? // Древняя Русь в свете зарубежных источников. М., 1999.
- Поппэ А. О зарождении культа святых Бориса и Глеба и о посвященных им произведениях // Russia mediaevalis. München, 1995, t. VIII, 1.
- Cook R. Russian History, Icelandic Story, and Byzantine Strategy in Eymundaráttr Hringssonar // Viator: Medieval and Renaissance Studies, 1986, vol. 17.
- Müller, Ludolf (2005). "Studien zur altrussischen Legende der Heiligen Boris und Gleb (6): III. Die Quellen der Chronikerzählung: 2. Die Erzählung über die Schlacht bei Ljubeč". Zeitschrift für Slavische Philologie (in German). 64 (2). Universitätsverlag WINTER Gmbh: 245–278. ISSN 0044-3492. JSTOR 24003950.
- Ostrowski, Donald (2006). "Alexander Nevskii's 'Battle on the Ice': The Creation of a Legend". Russian History/Histoire Russe. 33 (2/4). Brill: 289–312. doi:10.1163/187633106X00186. ISSN 0094-288X. JSTOR 24664446.

=== Reference works ===
- Галушка, А. А. Усобиця Володимировичів 1015—1019 // Encyclopedia of History of Ukraine : у 10 т. / редкол.: В. А. Смолій (голова) та ін. ; Інститут історії України НАН України. — К. : Наукова думка, 2013. — Т. 10 : Т — Я. — С. 246. — ISBN 978-966-00-1359-9.
- Kotlyar, Mykola (2009). "Любецька битва 1016" [Battle of Liubech 1016]. Encyclopedia of History of Ukraine (in Ukrainian). Institute of History of Ukraine. Archived from the original on 16 September 2016.
