= Battle of the River Bug =

Battle in Eastern Europe in 1018

Coordinates: 52°30′29.29″N 21°5′2.69″E

- Part of Bolesław I's intervention in the Kievan succession crisis
Date	1018
Location	Unknown
Result	Polish victory

Belligerents
Duchy of Poland	Kievan Rus'

Commanders and leaders
Bolesław I the Brave; Sviatopolk I the Accursed	Yaroslav I the Wise

Casualties and losses
Light	Heavy

The Battle of the River Bug, sometimes known as the Battle of Volyn', took place on 22–23 July 1018, in Red Ruthenia, near the Bug River and near Volyn' (Wołyń) Bolesław's Kiev Expedition in the 1015–1019 Kievan war of succession. Following the death of Vladimir the Great in 1015, his sons Yaroslav and Sviatopolk were at war about who should inherit the throne of Kievan Rus'. The forces of Bolesław I the Brave of Poland intervened in support of Sviatopolk, his son-in-law; jointly, they defeated Yaroslav's forces at the river Bug.

Both armies met on opposite banks of the river Bug. Yaroslav's forces took up positions with archers covering the crossing points; Bolesław took his time, allowing his army to rest, and started work on several makeshift bridges. The main battle occurred on 23 July.

Gallus Anonymus account

According to Polish chronicler Gallus Anonymus, the battle occurred by accident: Bolesław decided to throw a feast to boost morale of his army; Yaroslav's archers and scouts decided to stir up trouble for the Polish servants who were gutting the animals and preparing them near the river - but they only succeeded in annoying them so much that the servants themselves crossed the relatively shallow river and chased Yaroslav's much-surprised advance troops away. Bolesław learned about this quicker than Yaroslav, and managed to move most of his army across the river and attack the surprised Kievan prince, who didn't manage to muster his army in time; the Kievan army quickly broke rank and fled.

Primary Chronicle account

The Primary Chronicle (PVL, also known as the Tale of Bygone Years) gives a slightly different version of these events, in which both armies were combat-ready and facing each other across the river, and Bolesław, enraged by insults hurled by the Rus' army, charged across the river at the head of his army, surprising Yaroslav and shattering the Kievan army. Most modern historians support Gallus Anonymus' version, and all agree that after a short battle the Polish Duke was victorious, scoring a major victory. Yaroslav retreated to Novgorod, not Kiev - likely suspecting that he did not have enough strength left to defend Kiev, besieged by the Pechenegs, and with a significant pro-Sviatopolk faction inside the city.

While Yaroslav lost the battle, he was able to raise troops among the Novgorodians and eventually defeat his half-brother Sviatopolk in 1019. This enabled him to consolidate his position in Kiev, where he ruled over the golden age of Kievan Rus' until his death in 1054. Thus, in spite of this defeat at the hands of the Polish duke, Yaroslav became the greatest of the Kievan rulers.

== Bibliography ==
=== Primary sources ===
- Gallus Anonymus, Gesta principum Polonorum.
- Primary Chronicle (PVL).

=== Literature ===
- Martin, Janet (2007). Medieval Russia: 980–1584. Second Edition. E-book. Cambridge: Cambridge University Press. ISBN 978-0-511-36800-4.
