= Civil war in Rus' =

Civil war in Rus' (or in Ruthenia) may refer to the following:

- Feud of the Sviatoslavichi
- Kievan succession crisis of 1015–1019
- War of the Galician Succession (1205–1245)
- 1174–1177 Suzdalian war of succession
- Muscovite War of Succession
- Battle of Listven
- Battle on the Nemiga River
- Sack of Kiev (1169)
- Siege of Novgorod (1170)
- Battle of Vyshgorod
- Battle of Lipitsa
- Muscovite–Lithuanian Wars

== See also ==
- Russian Civil War (disambiguation)
