= Battle of Listven =

Battle in Eastern Europe in 1024

Coordinates: 51.766667°N 31.5°E

The Battle of Listven (1024) was part of the aftermath of the Kievan succession crisis of 1015–1019 following the death of Vladimir the Great (Volodymyr) in 1015. It was fought between his sons Mstislav of Chernigov and Kievan forces supporting Yaroslav the Wise; Mstislav defeated Yaroslav. The battle is mainly known from the account written under the year 6532 (1024) in the Primary Chronicle, completed about 90 years later. According to that legendary narrative, the battle took place at night during a thunderstorm.

== Battle ==
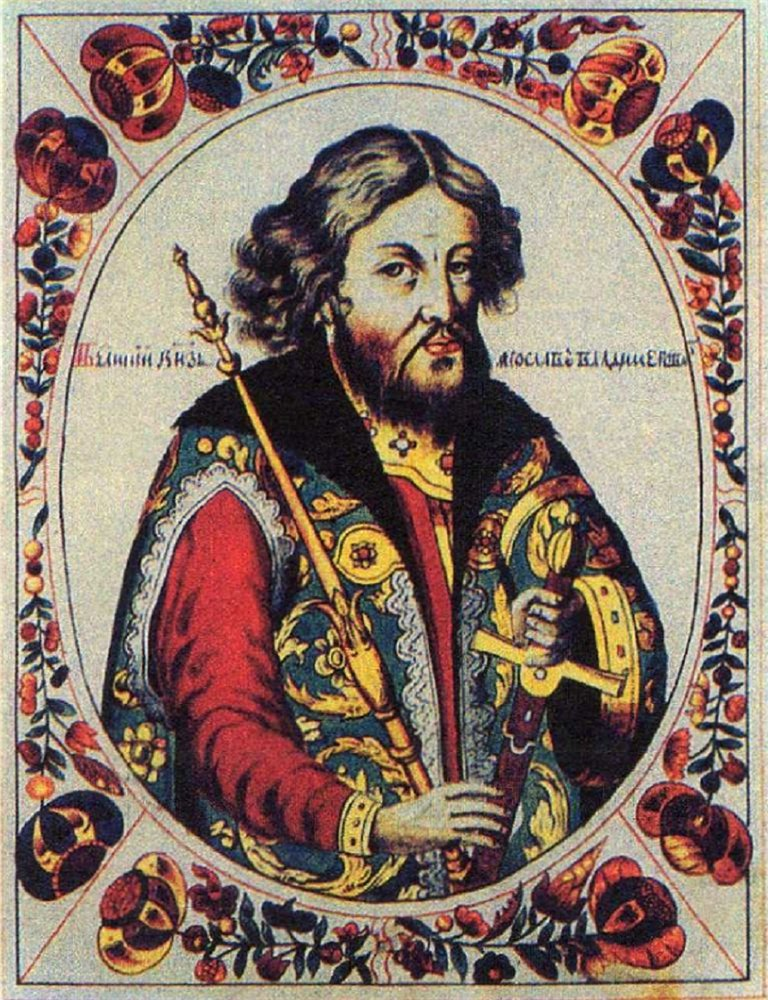
17th-century representation of Yaroslav the Wise from Tsarskiy titularnik (1672)

Following the Christianization of Kievan Rus', Vladimir sent his son, Yaroslav, to govern Veliky Novgorod in the north of Kievan Rus'. Mstislav was sent to Tmutarakan, in the south (on the Sea of Azov). Upon Vladimir's death, his son Sviatopolk I (later nicknamed "The Accursed") seized the throne and killed three of his brothers, Sviatoslav of Smolensk and the better-known Boris and Gleb, the first saints of the Rus' Orthodox Church. Sviatopolk was defeated by Yaroslav, who then challenged Mstislav for supremacy over Kiev. Mstislav marched on Kiev, but the Kievans rejected him. When he withdrew to Chernigov, northeast of Kiev, Yaroslav marched on him with an army of Varangians under Yakun, but was defeated at Listven (north of Chernigov) by Mstislav and Severians.

The battle led to a stalemate, with neither brother really able to gain supremacy over the other and rule from Kiev as sole ruler. Two years later, the brothers divided control of Kievan Rus' along the Dniepr River, with Yaroslav taking the western or Right Bank and Mstislav the eastern or Left Bank. Yaroslav ruled from Novgorod, while Mstislav remained at Chernigov. This division persisted and the two princes seemed to rule compatibly until Mstislav died in 1036, after which Yaroslav became sole ruler over Kievan Rus', ruling in Kiev itself until his own death in 1054.

== Bibliography ==
=== Primary sources ===
- Cross, Samuel Hazzard; Sherbowitz-Wetzor, Olgerd P. (1953). The Russian Primary Chronicle, Laurentian Text. Translated and edited by Samuel Hazzard Cross and Olgerd P. Sherbowitz-Wetzor (PDF). Cambridge, Massachusetts: The Mediaeval Academy of America. p. 325. (First edition published in 1930. The first 50 pages are a scholarly introduction.)
- Thuis, Hans (2015). Nestorkroniek. De oudste geschiedenis van het Kievse Rijk (in Dutch). Nijmegen: Uitgeverij Vantilt. p. 304. ISBN 9789460042287.
- Martin, Janet (2007). Medieval Russia: 980–1584. Second Edition. E-book. Cambridge: Cambridge University Press. ISBN 978-0-511-36800-4.
