= Polish capture of Kiev =

Throughout the Central European history, the Polish forces entered the city of Kiev twice:

- Polish capture of Kiev (1018), during Bolesław I's intervention in the Kievan succession crisis
- Polish capture of Kiev (1920), during the Kiev offensive, a part of the Polish-Bolshevik War
