= Bolesław I's intervention in the Kievan succession crisis =

Polish intervention in the war of Kievan succession

Bolesław I's expedition to Kiev
- Part of the Kievan succession crisis of 1015–1019
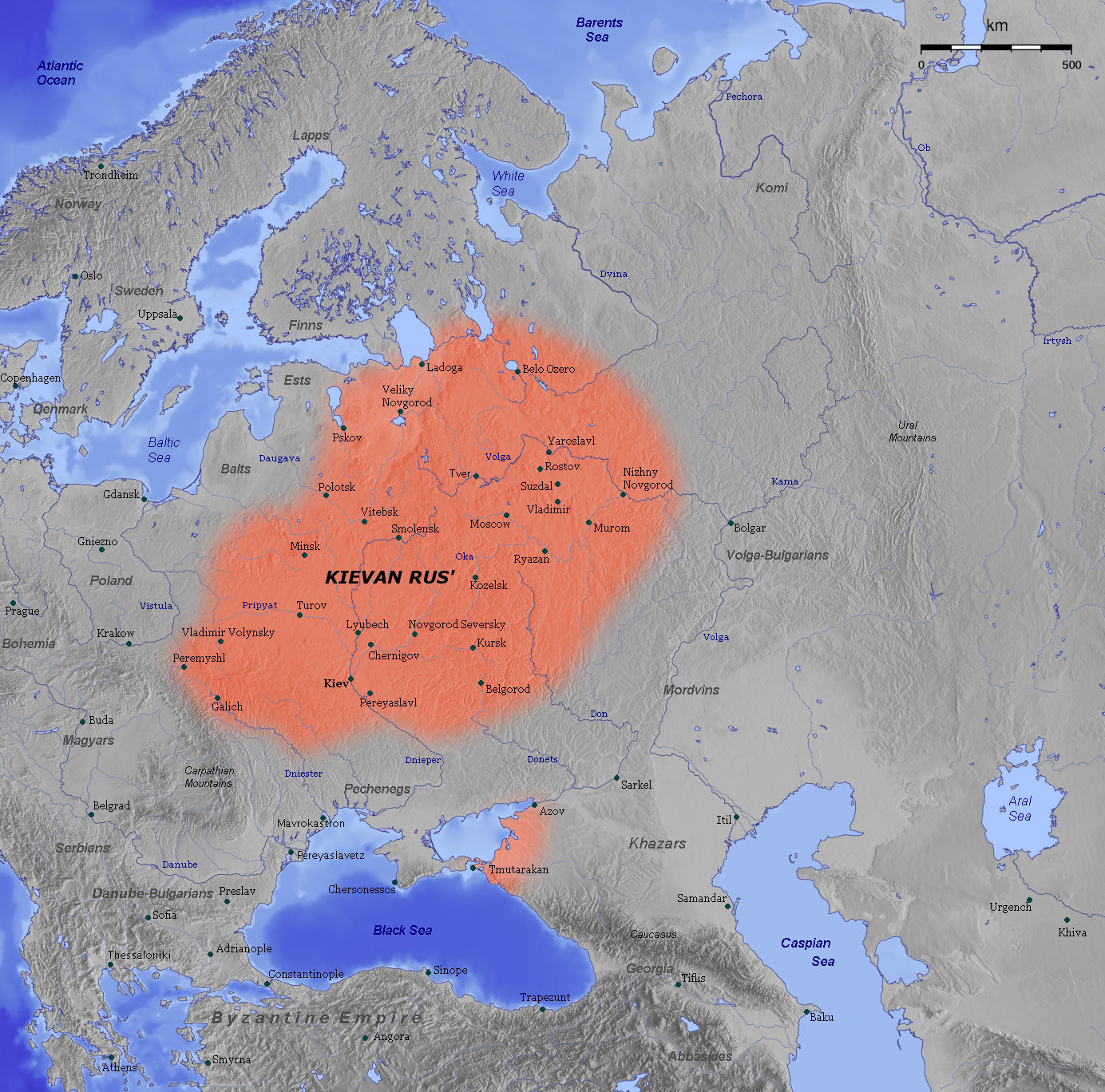
- Kievan Rus' in the 11th century, with adjoining regions
Date	June–September 1018
Location	Kievan Rus'
Result	Bolesław and Sviatopolk victory: Bolesław defeats Yaroslav and sacks Kiev; Cherven Towns are annexed into Poland; Sviatopolk becomes Grand Prince of Kiev, but is later dethroned by Yaroslav

Belligerents
Sviatopolk loyalists Duchy of Poland; Kingdom of Hungary	Yaroslav loyalists

Commanders and leaders
Bolesław I the Brave; Sviatopolk I	Yaroslav I

Strength
Uncertain: Germans (~300 knights), Hungarians (~500) and Pechenegs (~1,000 fighters), 2,000–5,000 Polish soldiers (est.) (Note: The estimate is based on the work of Polish historian Rafał Jaworski.)	Unknown but estimated as similar to opposing size

The 1018 intervention in the Kievan succession crisis by the Polish ruler Bolesław I the Brave was an episode in the Kievan succession crisis of 1015–1019, the struggle between Sviatopolk and his brother Yaroslav for the grand princely title of Kiev. It occurred when Sviatopolk's father-in-law Bolesław, ruler of Poland, intervened on Sviatopolk's behalf.

The intervention was initially successful as Bolesław defeated Yaroslav's armies, and temporarily secured the throne for Sviatopolk. But when Bolesław withdrew himself and his army from Kiev, Sviatopolk was unable to retain his position, being defeated by Yaroslav in the following year. Chronicles of the expedition include legendary accounts as well as factual history and have been subject to varied interpretations.

== Background ==
=== Previous interactions ===
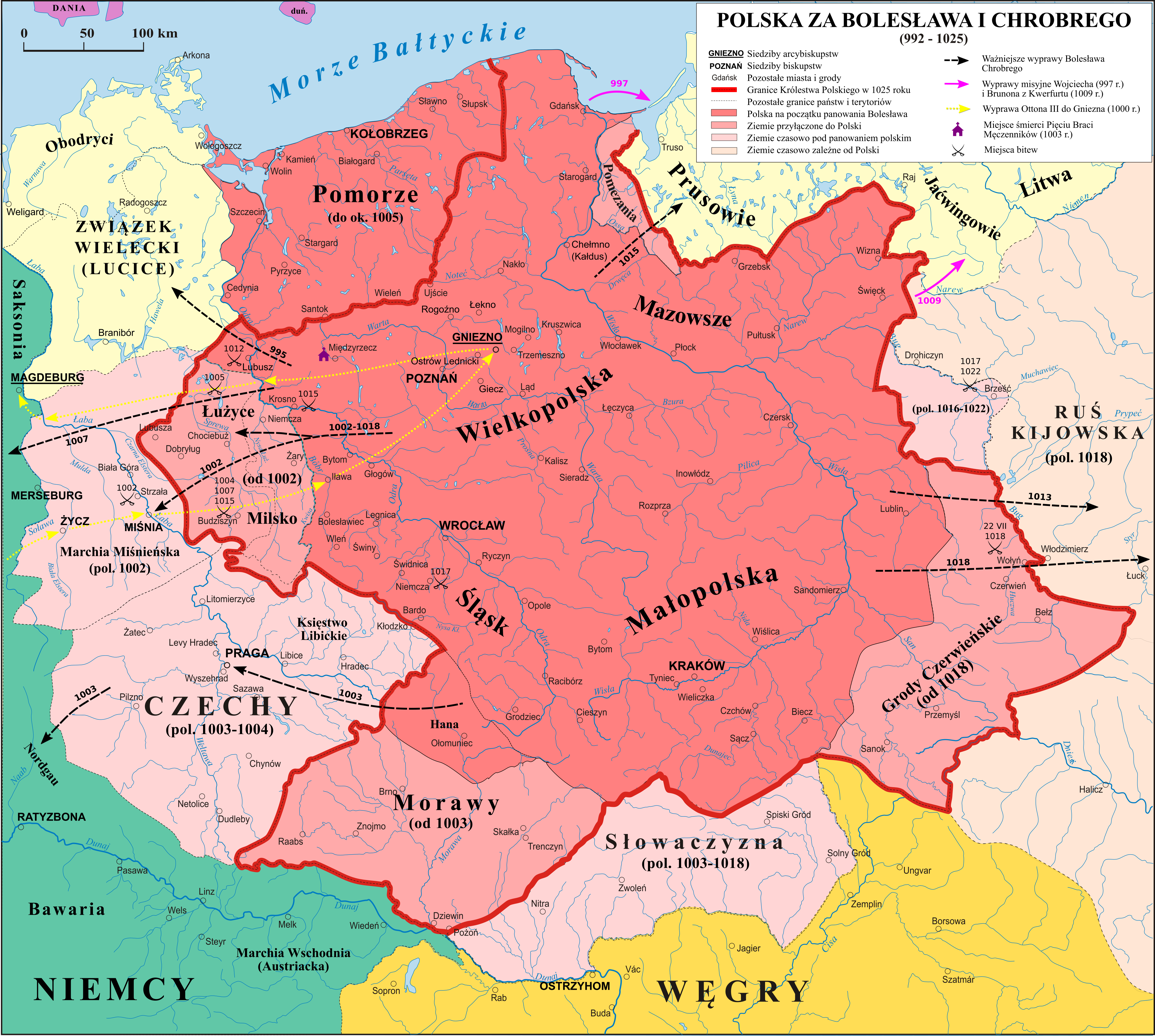
Poland during the reign of Bolesław the Brave

The ruler of Poland, Bolesław I, and the ruler of Kiev, Vladimir I, had previously fought over the Cherven Towns (in what was later called Red Ruthenia) in a conflict that ended favorably for Vladimir. Furthermore, Bolesław, who already had two wives, wanted to marry Predslava, one of Vladimir's daughters, in order to cement ties between the two families. Despite Bolesław's best efforts, the offer was refused and instead he had to accept a less prestigious connection to the house of Vladimir through the marriage of Bolesław's daughter to Vladimir's son, Sviatopolk. Between 1005 and 1013, Vladimir arranged Sviatopolk's marriage to Bolesław's daughter, whose name has not survived in sources.

It is possible that Vladimir decided that neither Sviatopolk nor Yaroslav would succeed to the Kievan throne after his death, as both Sviatopolk and Yaroslav revolted against their father. Vladimir perhaps intended that Sviatopolk would only receive the remote town of Turov after his death, and perhaps choosing his younger sons, Boris and Gleb, as successors despite Sviatopolk being older. Although Sviatopolk is known to have been older than Boris and Gleb, the exact birth order of Vladimir's sons is not known and Sviatopolk is alleged in some sources to have been a bastard. Perhaps unhappy by his rule being restricted to only a small appanage, Sviatopolk plotted to overthrow his father. Those theories, however, are based on very little evidence, and in the words of two historians, the origins of their "quarrels with their father are obscure". According to Thietmar of Merseburg, Bolesław encouraged Sviatopolk's revolt through his daughter and the latter's wife, though he does not specify the goal of the revolt. Sviatopolk's conspiracy was, in the event, thwarted by Vladimir, who called Sviatopolk and his entourage to Kiev and jailed them in 1013.

The planned overthrow, if it existed, may have been supported by Bishop Reinbern of Kołobrzeg, who had traveled with Bolesław's daughter. According to the same chronicler, Reinbern actively took part in converting pagans in and around the Rus lands, but was imprisoned with Sviatopolk and the latter's wife. Reinbern, who might have acted in the interest of Catholic Rome, died shortly after being imprisoned. It is of note that Bolesław invaded Kiev's lands in 1013. This was possibly Bolesław's first attempt to re-take the Cherven Towns, though it has also been argued that his goal might have been to free Sviatopolk.

=== Death of Vladimir ===
Just before Vladimir died, he had sent his son Boris on campaign against the nomads in the south. According to the Primary Chronicle, Sviatopolk seized Kiev while those of Vladimir's retainers who were with Boris on campaign encouraged Boris to take power, an offer Boris refused apparently stating "Be it not for me to raise my hand against my elder brother". In the confusion resulting from the death of Vladimir Sviatopolk was able to seize power in Kiev, as Yaroslav was in the north, Mstislav in the south, Sviatoslav in the Derevlian land, Gleb in Murom and Boris on the aforementioned expedition against the Pechenegs. As Franklin and Shepard put it, Sviatopolk's "previous arrest turned to his advantage, for it ensured that he was already ... closest to the center of power". According to the Primary Chronicle, Sviatopolk successfully arranged the murder of three of his brothers, Boris of Rostov, Gleb of Murom and Sviatoslav of the Derevlian lands.

When news of the fratricides reached Vladimir's fourth son, Yaroslav in Novgorod, he came to Kiev from the north with Novgorodians and Varangians. Sviatopolk's reign in Kiev was threatened. After a 3-month stand-off near Lyubech, Sviatopolk was defeated and "fled to the Poles". Bolesław, who had recently agreed a peace with the German Kingdom (the Treaty of Bautzen), agreed to support his son-in-law through military intervention.

== Sources ==
There are three main sources that provide historians with evidence for these events. The best and most reliable account is from a chronicle by Bishop Thietmar of Merseburg, who obtained detailed information from Saxon knights fighting for Bolesław.

The Primary Chronicle (PVL; previously attributed to Nestor the Chronicler) is another source giving a detailed account of events, its reliability being variable, depending event-by-event on the sources from which it was compiled. Nestor's writing reflects the typical Rus' admiration of Vladimir as a saint, while Bishop Thietmar's account, despite a generally positive attitude towards the Rus', paints both Bolesław and Vladimir exclusively in a negative light.

A third source is the Gesta principum Polonorum, a semi-legendary ode to the early Polish dukes written in the 1110s by the Benedictine monk Gallus'. This account portrays Bolesław in a very positive light.

== Expedition to Kiev ==
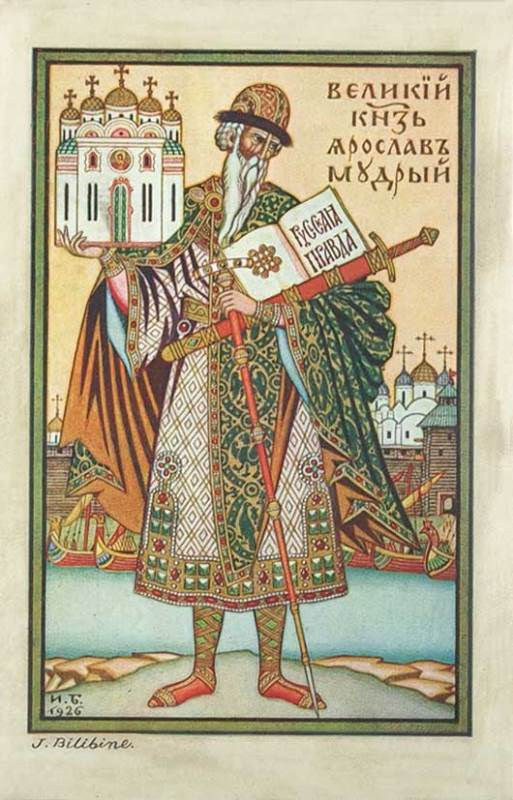
Yaroslav, illustration by Ivan Bilibin

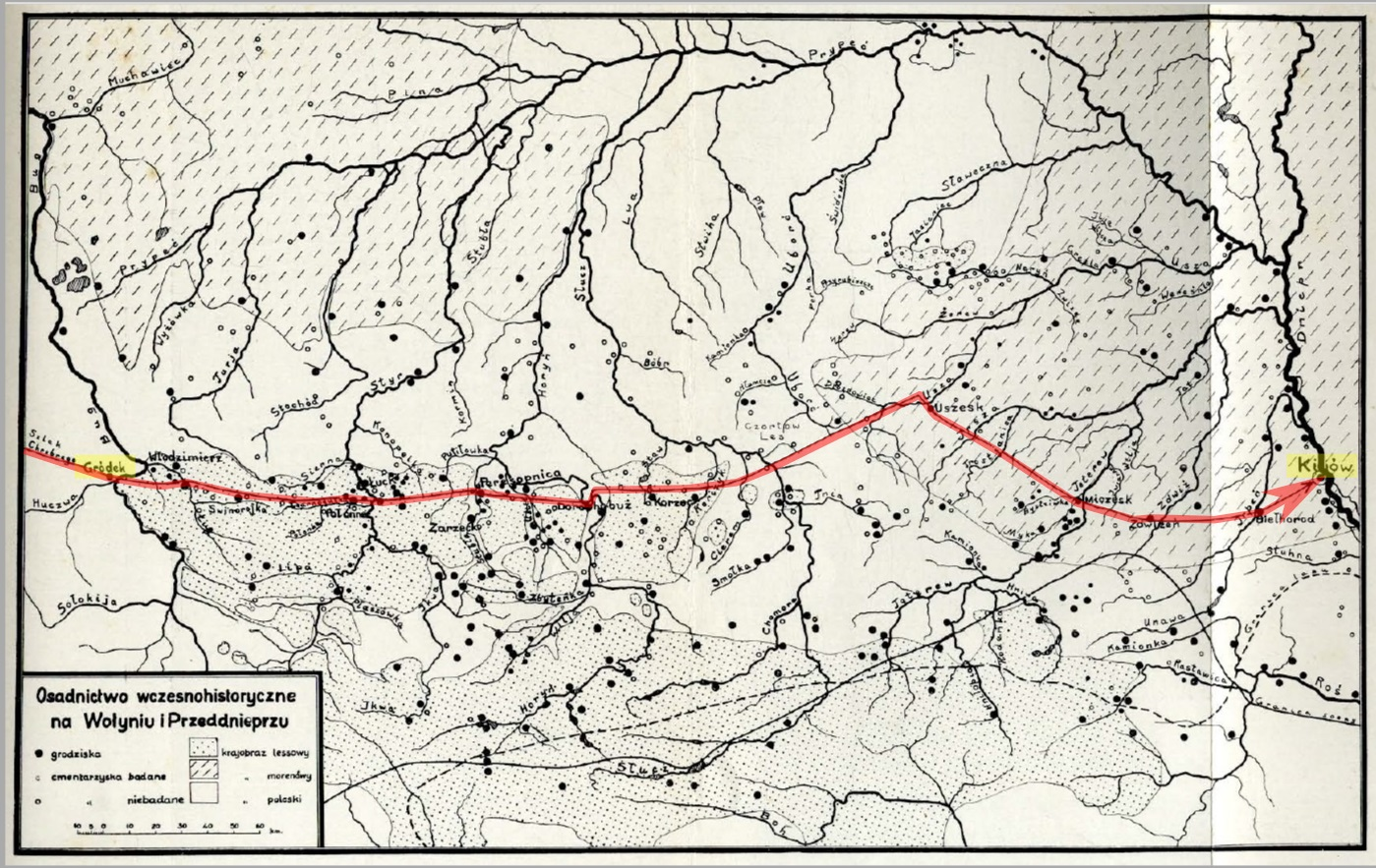
Bolesław's route to Kiev (Robert Jakimowicz, Szlak wyprawy kijowskiej Bolesława Chrobrego w świetle archeologii, Rocznik Wołyński, tom III, Równe 1934.)

According to Thietmar, the army of Bolesław crossed the border in 1018 and reached Kiev later that same year. Little is known about the armies. Thietmar relates:

"Among those rendering assistance to the aforesaid duke, were three hundred of our [German] warriors, five hundred Hungarians, and one thousand Pechenegs".

Polish historian Rafał Jaworski states that the estimates of the size of Bolesław's army range between 2,000 and 5,000 Polish warriors, in addition to Thietmar's reported 1,000 Pechenegs, 300 German knights, and 500 Hungarian mercenaries. Less is known about Yaroslav's army, but it is assumed that he managed to collect a force of similar size. It is also believed that he was aware of Bolesław's intentions and had time to make defensive preparations.

The narrative of Bolesław's invasion is almost entirely dependent upon the account of Thietmar:

"We may not keep silent regarding the sad and harmful events that occurred in Russia. For, on our advice, Boleslav attacked it with a large army and caused much destruction. On July 22, the duke came up to a certain river, where he ordered his army to set up camp and separate the necessary bridges. Also camped near the river, along with his army, was the king of the Russians."

Probably after concentrating his forces during June, in July Bolesław led his troops to the border - the banks of the Southern Bug River, near one of the settlements of the Volhynia region. In the meantime, Bolesław's Pecheneg allies approached Kiev, forcing Yaroslav to detach a part of his forces to ensure the safety of his capital. According to Jaworski, Yaroslav, in turn, wanted to prevent Bolesław from uniting with the Pechenegs, defeat Bolesław's main force and then take care of the less organized Pechenegs.

The two armies met on opposite banks of the River Bug. Yaroslav's forces may have taken position with archers covering the crossing points. Bolesław seems to have taken his time, allowing his army to rest, and started work on makeshift bridges. The Battle of the River Bug finally occurred around July 23.

Thietmar's near-contemporary account offered the following:

The Poles provoked the enemy into fighting and, with unexpected success, drove them from the river bank which they were supposed to defend. Elated by this news, Boleslav hastily notified his companions and quickly cross the river although not without effort. In contrast, the hostile army, drawn up in battle formation, vainly attempted to defend its homeland. It collapsed at the first attack, however, and failed to mount any effective resistance. Among those who fled, many were killed, but only a few of the victors were lost. On our side, the dead included Erich, an illustrious knight whom our emperor had long held in chains. From that day on, with every success, Boleslav drove the scattered enemies before him; and the whole populace received and honoured him with many gifts.

According to the later Chronicle of Polish Dukes by Gallus, the battle occurred by accident: When Bolesław decided to throw a feast to boost his army's morale, Yaroslav's archers and scouts decided to create trouble for the Polish servants who were gutting the animals and preparing them near the river. However, they only annoyed them enough that the servants themselves crossed the relatively shallow river and chased away Yaroslav's surprised troops, who had been guarding the river. Bolesław learned of the skirmish sooner than Yaroslav, and managed to move most of his army across the river, defeating the surprised Yaroslav.

The Russian Primary Chronicle gives a different version of events, in which both armies were combat ready and separated by the river before Bolesław, enraged by insults from across the river, charged with his army, surprising Yaroslav and scattering his forces. All accounts agree that the Polish prince was victorious in the battle. Yaroslav retreated north to Novgorod, rather than to Kiev - likely suspecting that he lacked enough strength to defend Kiev, which was besieged by the Pechenegs and had a significant pro-Sviatopolk faction within its walls. Nestor notes that after reaching Novgorod, Yaroslav attempted to flee "overseas" in hopes of coming back with a Varangian force, but according to the Primary Chronicle, the citizens of Novgorod pressured him to lead the fight back to Bolesław and Sviatopolk.

== Fall and occupation of Kiev ==
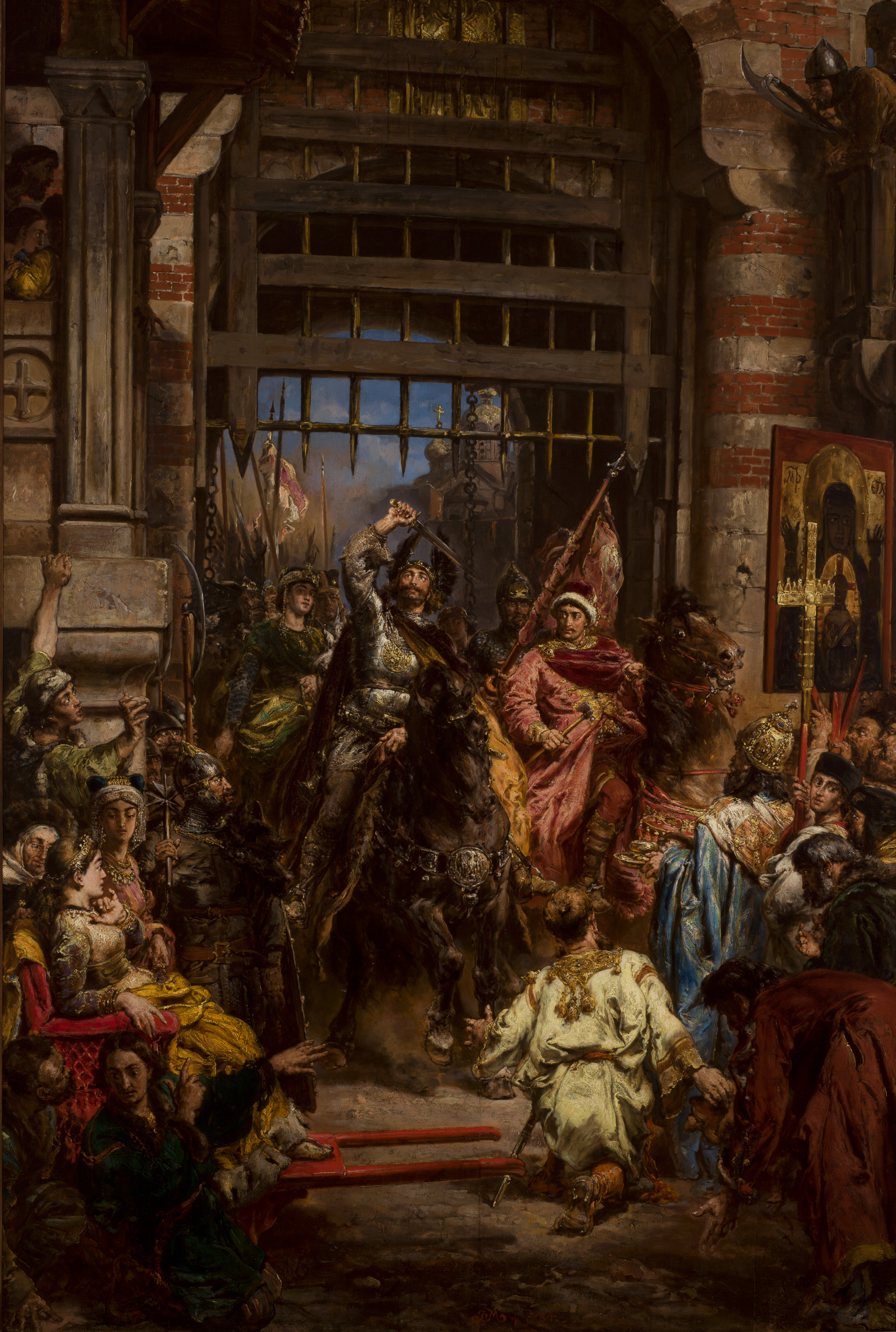
Fabled moment of Bolesław and Sviatopolk at Kiev hitting the Golden Gate with the Szczerbiec sword. 1884 painting by Jan Matejko.

Bolesław's victory opened the road to Kiev, already under harassment from his Pecheneg allies.

At Boleslav's instigation, the very strong city of Kiev was disturbed by the constant attacks of hostile Pechenegs and severely weakened by fire. It was defended by the inhabitants, but quickly surrendered to the foreign warriors, after its king fled and abandoned it.

The city, which suffered from fires caused by the Pecheneg siege, surrendered upon seeing the main Polish army on August 14. The entering forces, led by Bolesław, were ceremonially welcomed by the local archbishop and Vladimir's family:

On 14 August, the city received Boleslav and Sventipolk, its long-absent lord. Thereafter, through his favour, and from fear of us, the whole region was brought into submission. When they arrived, the archbishop of that city received them, at the church of St Sophia, with relics of the saints and other kinds of ceremonial apparatus.

A later popular Polish legend related to the history of the Polish coronation weapon, the Szczerbiec sword, is the tale of the Golden Gate of Kiev, upon which the Szczerbiec was supposedly notched when Bolesław's entered the city. This legend has no historical basis, however, and the gate was only built approximately 20 years later, while the sword itself was not forged until 200 years later. It is of course possible, however unlikely, that Bolesław notched another gate with another sword, thus giving rise to the legend.

Bolesław sent his German and Hungarian mercenaries home after Sviatopolk was re-established on the Kievan throne, "the populace" having "flocked to him" and having "appeared loyal". It is not known how long Bolesław remained in and around Kiev. The 10 months given by the unreliable account of Gallus is fanciful. Bolesław in fact departed within a few months and, as Thietmar died on December 1, 1018, Bolesław must have been back in Poland a good time before December.

The Primary Chronicle alleges that as the result of Polish plundering, Sviatopolk ordered "that any Lyakhs [i.e. Poles] found in the city should be killed". The resulting unrest, according to the same source, forced Bolesław to leave Kiev, whereupon Sviatopolk was left to fend for himself. This negative turn of events is omitted in the only contemporary source, Thietmar of Merseberg's Chronikon. By contrast, his summary of the expedition, written in a part of the Chronikon not devoted to the expedition, recounts that:

Duke Boleslav invaded the Russian king's realm with his army. After placing his long-exiled brother-in-law, the Russian's brother, on the throne, he returned in high spirits.

According to Thietmar, Bolesław asked Yaroslav to return his daughter, whom Yaroslav had taken prisoner. As Yaroslav refused, Bolesław took members of Yaroslav's family to Poland as prisoners when he returned to his country in September. His captives included Vladimir's widow and Yaroslav's sister, Predslava, whose hand Bolesław had sought earlier. Having been rebuffed, Bolesław now took her as a concubine. The Polish duke also took many commoners as well as much of the treasury of Kiev. Among the notable commoners was the venerated Saint Moses the Hungarian.

In the past some historians (such as Zhylenko and Kostomarov) have conjectured that Bolesław decided to rule Kievan lands himself, though Bolesław had no power base there and no Rurikid blood. Bolesław's main motivation, according to the interpretations of modern historians, was to regain the Cherven Towns for his patrimony, while at the same time aiding his kinsman, to whom he had an obligation. The expedition also furnished an occasion to enrich his followers from Kiev's famous wealth. Bolesław, soon after his arrival, sent a significant force to quarter in Kiev and nearby towns, forcing Kievans to sustain them, and collected significant tributes that he divided among his allies. It was related by Thietmar that before departing, Bolesław

was shown an unspeakable amount of treasure, most of which he distributed among his friends and supporters.

On many later occasions in the Kievan period the rulers of Poland, as well as Hungarians or Pechenegs, were paid to intervene in the Kievan succession disputes; in the case of Bolesław II, the Polish monarch took the money without making any expedition.

== Aftermath ==
Sviatopolk lost the throne soon afterwards and lost his life the following year. As Bolesław was involved in a conflict with Holy Roman Emperor Henry II, he did not intervene on behalf of his son-in-law when he was deposed and instead signed a pact with Yaroslav, who had successfully regained the throne. Although he lost control of Kiev, Bolesław succeeded in keeping the Cherven Towns captured by Vladimir the Great in 981; he was crowned King of Poland in 1025. Yaroslav outlived Bolesław and contributed greatly to the strengthening of Kievan Rus'.

== Bibliography ==
=== Primary sources ===
- Primary Chronicle (c. 1110s).
  - Cross, Samuel Hazzard; Sherbowitz-Wetzor, Olgerd P. (1953). The Russian Primary Chronicle, Laurentian Text. Translated and edited by Samuel Hazzard Cross and Olgerd P. Sherbowitz-Wetzor (PDF). Cambridge, Massachusetts: The Mediaeval Academy of America. p. 325. (First edition published in 1930. The first 50 pages are a scholarly introduction.)
  - Thuis, Hans (2015). Nestorkroniek. De oudste geschiedenis van het Kievse Rijk (in Dutch). Nijmegen: Uitgeverij Vantilt. p. 304. ISBN 9789460042287.
  - Ostrowski, Donald; Birnbaum, David J. (7 December 2014). "Rus' primary chronicle critical edition – Interlinear line-level collation". pvl.obdurodon.org (in Church Slavic). Archived from the original on 28 April 2025.
- Thietmar of Merseburg, Chronicon Thietmari (1018).
  - Warner, David A., ed. (2001). Ottonian Germany: The Chronicon of Thietmar of Merseburg. Manchester Medieval Sources Series. Manchester & New York: Manchester University Press. p. 410. ISBN 0-7190-4926-1.
- Gallus Anonymus, Gesta principum Polonorum (c. 1118).
- Kyiv Caves Patericon (c. 1462)
  - Zhylenko, Iryna V. (2001). Патерик Києво-Печерський Pateryk Kyjevo-Pechers'kyj (in Ukrainian). Kyiv: Vydavn. Dim "KM Academia". ISBN 966-518-147-5. Sec. 30 and editor's notes.

=== Literature ===
- Barford, P. M. (2001). The Early Slavs: Culture and Society in Early Medieval Eastern Europe. Ithaca: Cornell University Press. ISBN 0-8014-3977-9.
- Franklin, Simon; Shepard, Jonathan (1996). The Emergence of Rus, 750–1200. Longman History of Russia. London & New York: Longman. ISBN 0-582-49091-X.
- Grekov, Boris (2004) [1944]. Киевская Русь Kievskaya Rus [Kievan Rus'] (in Russian). Moscow: Ast. ISBN 5-17-025449-0.
- Jaworski, Rafał (5 August 2006). "Wyprawa Kijowska Chrobrego rok 1018" [Kyiv expedition of the Brave in the year 1018] (PDF). Chwała Oręża Polskiego (Glory of the Polish Arms) (in Polish) (2). Rzeczpospolita: 4–12. Also appeared in Mówią Wieki.
- Martin, Janet (2007). Medieval Russia: 980–1584. Second Edition. E-book. Cambridge: Cambridge University Press. ISBN 978-0-511-36800-4.
- Ryzhov, Konstantin (1998). Все монархи мира. Россия: 600 кратких жизнеописаний [All monarchs of the world: Russia: 600 short biographies] (in Russian). Moscow: Veche Publishers. ISBN 5-7838-0268-9. LCCN 98160491.
- Kostomarov, Nikolay (Mykola) (1993) [1873–1888]. Русская история в жизнеописаниях ее главнейших деятелей Russkaya istoriya v zhizneopisaniyakh ee glavneyshikh deyateley [Rus' History in Biographies of its Main Figures] (in Russian). Moscow: Myslʹ. ISBN 5-244-00742-4. LCCN 94152432. Section 2: Yaroslav (in Russian)
