= Moses the Hungarian =

Kievan Russian monk (died 1043)

Saint Moses the Hungarian
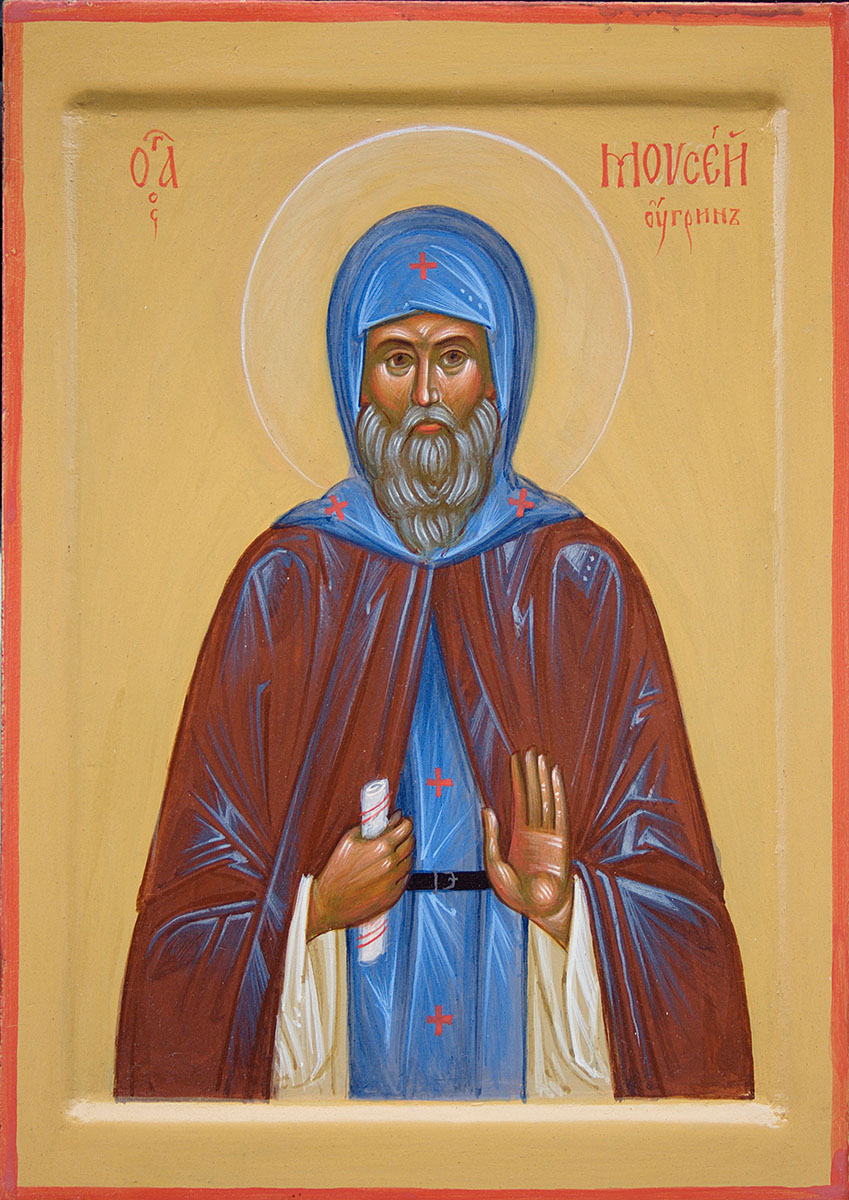
- Icon of Saint Moses the Hungarian

Venerable
- Born: c. 990–995; Principality of Hungary
- Died: 26 July 1043; Kiev Pechersk Lavra, Kievan Rus'
- Venerated in: Eastern Orthodox Church; Eastern Catholic Churches
- Feast: 26 July

Moses the Hungarian (Russian: Моисей Угрин, Moisey Ugrin; Hungarian: Magyar Mózes; died 26 July 1043) was a Kievan Russian monk of Hungarian origin. He is venerated as a saint on 26 July by the Eastern Orthodox Church.

== Life ==
Moses was born around 990–995. Although the Hungarians were mostly pagan at the time (though they later became Christians), the Hungarian chieftain Gyula of Transylvania was baptized in Constantinople. This probably made it possible for Moses to leave Transylvania to serve the princely family in Kiev. Between 1015 and 1018, already preparing to become a monk, he was an escort of Predslava, the daughter of Vladimir I of Kiev. In Kiev, he witnessed the assissination of the princes Boris and Gleb and had to find refuge with the sister of the future Prince Yaroslav I the Wise.

Following the Polish expedition of 1018, he was carried to Poland as a prisoner and could only return in 1025. Moses spent the rest of his life in the Kiev Cave Monastery.
