= Druzhina =

Retinue in service of a Slavic chieftain

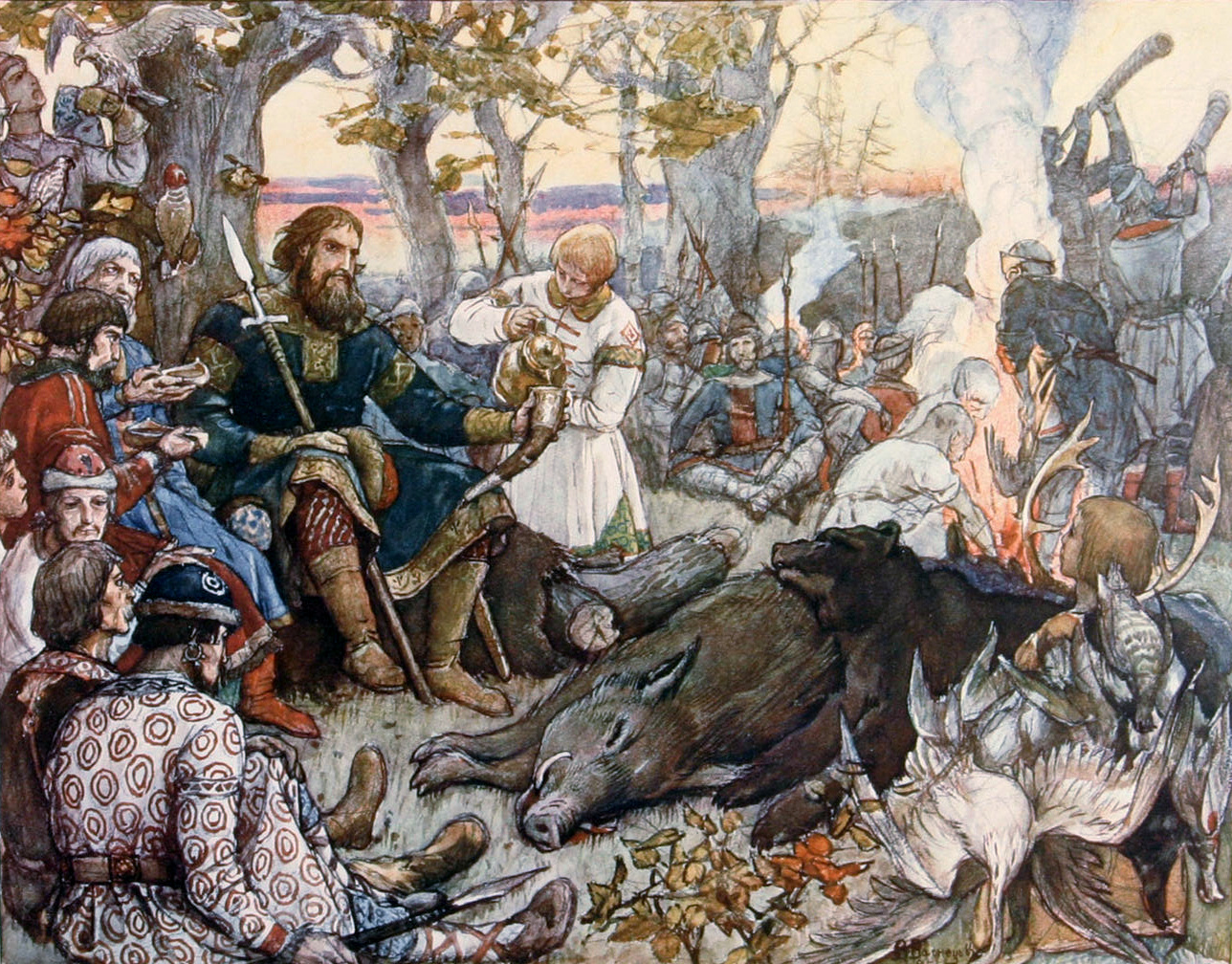
Grand Prince Vladimir Monomakh of the Rurikid dynasty resting with his druzhina after a hunt, by Viktor Vasnetsov.

A druzhina (Note: From drug (Russian: друг, lit. 'friend') and group suffix -ina; Slovak and Czech: družina; Polish: drużyna; Russian: дружина, romanized: druzhina; Ukrainian: дружи́на, romanized: druzhýna, lit. 'fellowship'.) is the Slavic word for a retinue in service of a chieftain, also called a knyaz (prince).

== Kievan Rus' ==
Druzhina was flexible both as a term and as an institution. At its core, it referred to the prince's permanent personal bodyguards (malaia; 'small' Druzhina); more generally, it referred to the prince's extended household (dvor; court).

Examples of functionaries within a druzhina
Title	Description
Voevoda	General
Kormilets	Head of household
Tiun	Steward/estate manager
Tysiatskii	Military governor of a city
Sotskie	Supports a tysiatskii
Lesser functionaries
Kliuchnik	Domestic manager
Birich	Type of enforcement officer
Pechatnik	Seal-man
Pisets	Scribe

Apart from a prince's kins, the druzhina was his closest and most vital social group: it served as the "protective and coercitive basis for his power". A wise prince was expected to nurture his druzhina, keep it close, feast with it, consult it and reward it. The effects of not doing so can be seen with Boris's case; after his father's death, the latter's druzhina pledged loyalty to him and offered him the throne of Kiev. Boris declined, the druzhina dispersed, and he was left defenceless against the agents of his brother Sviatopolk, who murdered him.

The druzhina had perhaps once "truly corresponded to some egalitarian ideal of military fellowship, with the prince as patron and first among equals". However, as the role of a prince and the running of a principality (especially a senior prince's) became more complex, so did the druzhina. It developed its own internal hierarchies, divisions of functions, structure of offices and responsibilities.

The druzhina had its own rank-and-file members ('youths') in the junior druzhina (mladshaia) and its own senior members (boyars). Boyars offices encompassed military, domestic and urban administration. The druzhina was a military elite, and the distinction between military and administrative offices thus wasn't always clear. According to Novgorodian inscriptions, for example, the 'swordman' (mechnik) also had a role in fiscal administration or tribute-gathering.

The druzhina was loyal to the prince personally, and could thus somewhat choose whom to support.

== Poland ==
Ibrahim ibn Yaqub, who travelled in 961–62 across parts of Europe, mentions that the drużyna of Duke Mieszko I of Poland had 3000 men, paid by the duke. Unlike his predecessors, Casimir I the Restorer promoted landed gentry over the drużyna as his base of power. In modern Polish, the word drużyna usually means "team" and is often used within scouting, sports, military, and historical contexts.

== See also ==
- Housecarl
- Leidang
- Hird
