= Russian Civil War (disambiguation) =

The Russian Civil War (1917–1922) was a multi-party civil war in the former Russian Empire immediately after the two Russian Revolutions of 1917, as many factions vied to determine Russia's political future.

Civil wars in the Russian Tsardom included:

- Muscovite War of Succession (1425 – 1453)
- Kazan rebellion (1552–1556)
- Time of Troubles (1598–1613)
- Uprising of Bolotnikov (1605 – 1608)
- Bashkir rebellion (1662–1664)
- Razin's rebellion (1670 – 1672)
- Bashkir rebellion (1681–1684)
- Bashkir rebellion (1704–1711)
- Bulavin Rebellion (1707–1708)
- Pugachev's Rebellion (1773 – 1775)
- Decembrists' revolt (1825)

Civil wars in the Russian Federation include:

- East Prigorodny Conflict (1989–1992)
- August Coup (August 19–21, 1991)
- Black October (21 September – 4 October 1993)
- First Chechen War (1994–1996)
- War in Dagestan (1999)
- Second Chechen War (1999–2009)
- Insurgency in the North Caucasus (2009–2017)

For actions against the Russian Government under President Vladimir Putin during the Russian invasion of Ukraine, see:

- Belarusian and Russian partisan movement (2022–present)
- 2023 Belgorod Oblast incursions
- Wagner Group rebellion

== Other uses ==
- Russian Civil War 1918–1922, a 1976 board wargame that simulates the Bolshevik Revolution and Civil War

== See also ==
- Civil war in Rus' (disambiguation)
- List of wars involving Russia
- Russo-Ukrainian War (2014–present)
