= Predslava Volodimerovna =

Kievan Rus' princess

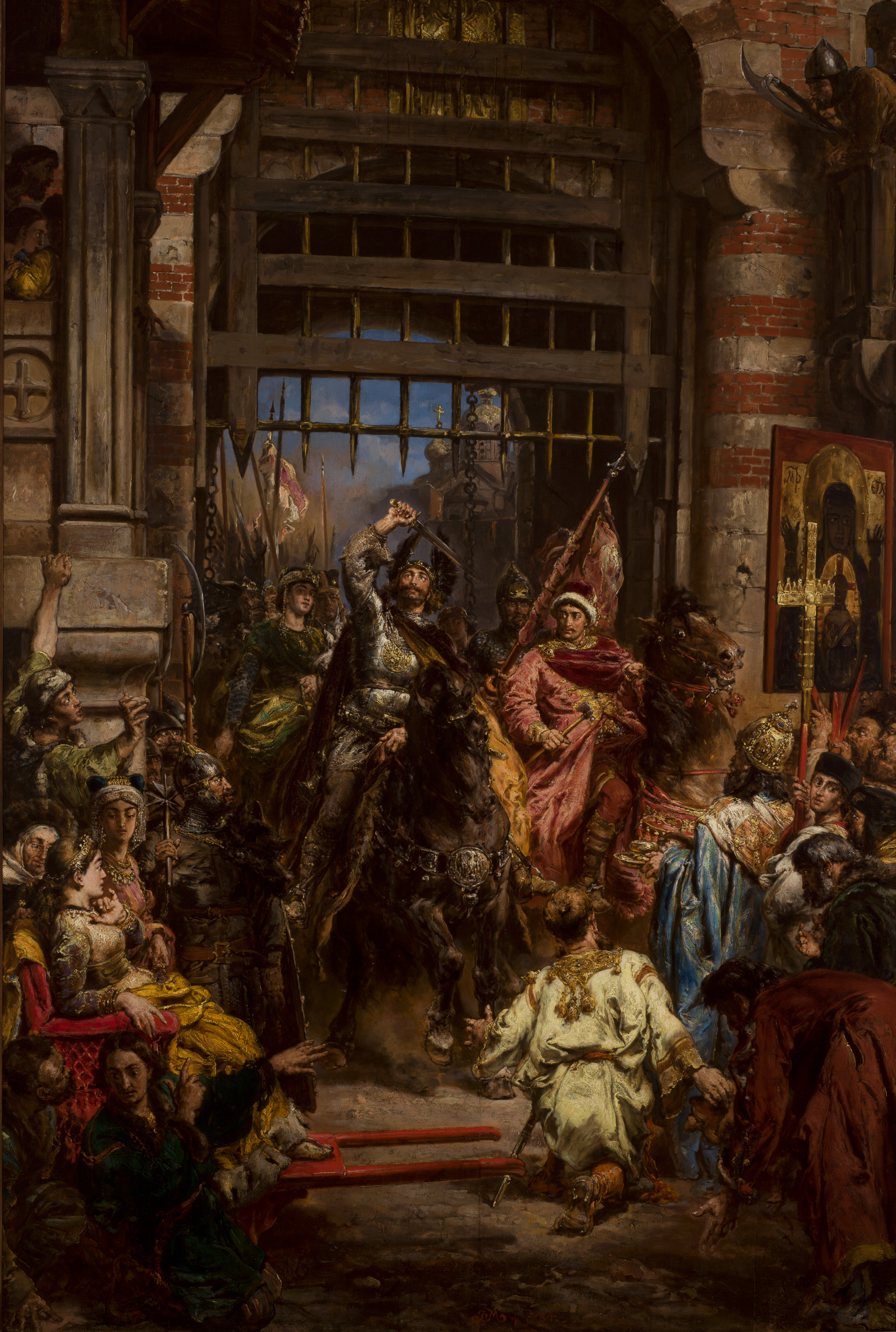
Bolesław the Brave with Sviatopolk near The Golden Gate in Kyiv (Jan Matejko 1884). Predslava is the woman sitting in the chair on the left.

Predslava Volodimerovna (Ukrainian: Предслава Володимирівна, romanized: Predslava Volodymyrivna; Polish: Przedsława Włodzimierzówna; Russian: Предслава Владимировна, romanized: Predslava Vladimirovna 981/984 – c. 1040) was a princess from Kievan Rus', daughter of Volodimer' I of Kiev and Rogned', concubine of Bolesław I the Brave, and sister of Yaroslav the Wise. She is one of the few named women who appear in the Primary Chronicle (PVL).

The two mentions are variations of the same account under the year 1015, in columns 135–136 and 140–141:

- "At this moment, Yaroslav received from Predslava the tidings of [their] father's death, and Yaroslav sent [someone] to Gleb, saying: 'Do not set out, your father (136) has died and your brother has been murdered by Svyatopolk."
- "The same night news came from Kiev sent by his sister Predslava: "Your father has died and Svyatopolk settled in Kiev. He has killed Boris, and has sent [men] against Gleb. (141) Be exceedingly on your guard against him." (In Ipa, Xle and Rad: "settled in Kiev, having sent [men] to kill Boris and Gleb.")

== Bibliography ==
=== Primary sources ===
- Cross, Samuel Hazzard; Sherbowitz-Wetzor, Olgerd P. (1953). The Russian Primary Chronicle, Laurentian Text. Translated and edited by Samuel Hazzard Cross and Olgerd P. Sherbowitz-Wetzor (PDF). Cambridge, Massachusetts: The Mediaeval Academy of America. p. 325.
- Thuis, Hans (2015). Nestorkroniek. De oudste geschiedenis van het Kievse Rijk (in Dutch). Nijmegen: Uitgeverij Vantilt. p. 304. ISBN 9789460042287.

=== Literature ===
- Raffensperger, Christian (2024). Name Unknown: The Life of a Rusian Queen. Routledge. p. 232. doi:10.4324/9781003325185. ISBN 978-1-04-003014-1.
