= Rafał Jaworski =

Polish historian and archivist

Rafał Jaworski (born 1973) is a Polish historian and archivist, affiliated with Jan Kochanowski University's branch in Piotrków Trybunalski. He is the author and one of the editors of many articles in the popular Polish historical magazine, Mówią Wieki. He studied in the Warsaw University and specializes in the medieval history of Poland.

== Selected works ==
- Łowy Władysława Jagiełły (On the hunt of the King Władysław Jagiełło)
- Ewangeliarze ruskie jako księgi wpisów. Próba zarysowania problemu na przykładzie Ewangeliarza Ławryszewskiego (Russian religious texts as documents.)
- Archiwum Koronne Krakowskie za Jagiellonów (Royal Archives in Kraków during the Jagiellon Dynasty)
- Contributor to The Bibliography of the Printed Sources to the History of Poland in the Late Middle Ages, 1386–1506, part 1
