= Reinbern =

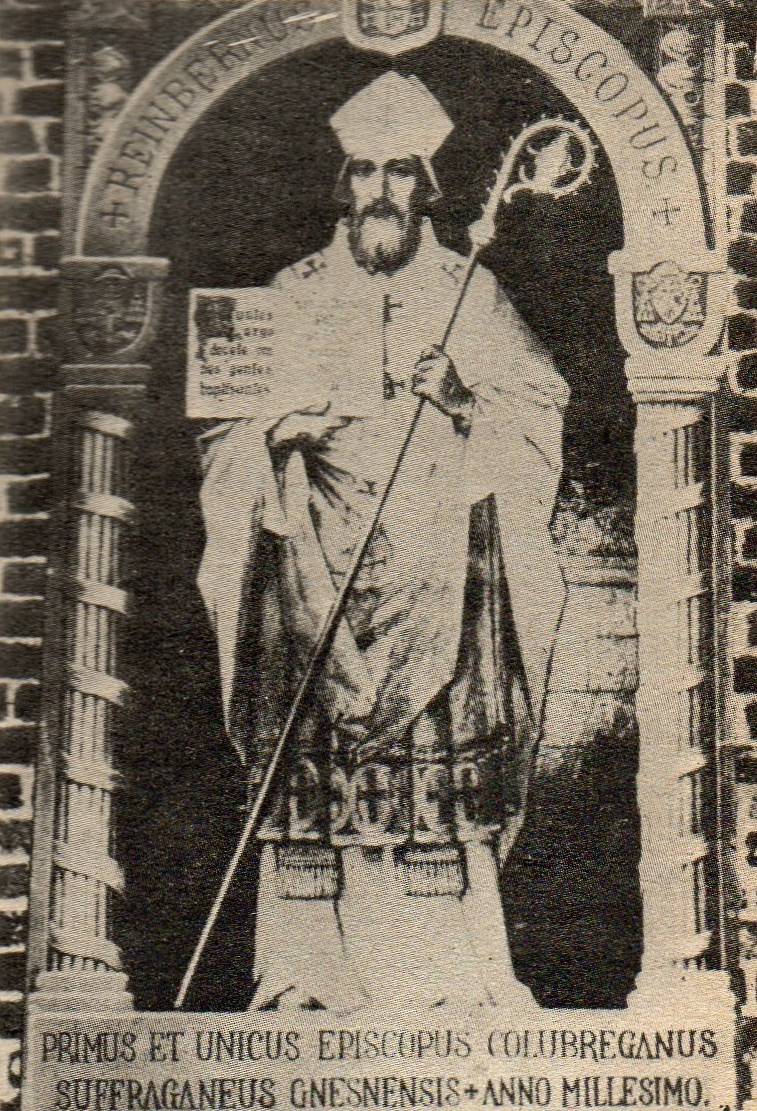
Reinbern

Reinbern (died 1013 or 1015) was the only bishop of the short-lived Diocese of Kołobrzeg (1000 – c. 1007).

Reinbern was born in the Hassegau area of the medieval Duchy of Saxony. When Holy Roman Emperor Otto III met with his friend, the Polish duke Boleslaw I in the Congress of Gniezno (Gnesen), the Archbishopric of Gniezno was founded. One of Gniezno's subordinated bishoprics was the Diocese of Kołobrzeg., Its purpose was to advance the Christianization of the pagan Pomeranians that shortly before had been subdued by the Poles. Reinbern was made bishop. It is documented that he "baptized" the Baltic Sea by spilling Holy Oil and Holy Water into the sea. He also demolished shrines of pagan gods in Pomerania. Yet, after his bishopric was driven out during a pagan uprising, he returned to Boleslaw's court. In 1009, he accompanied Boleslaw to the marriage arranged between Boleslaw's daughter and Sviatopolk, the prince of Turov in Kievan Rus', where an internal crisis involving Boleslaw's daughter led to the arrest of Reinbern by Vladimir I. Soon afterwards, he died imprisoned in 1012.
