= Eymundar þáttr hrings =

Norse saga

Eymundar þáttr hrings is a short Norse saga, which is preserved in two versions. One of them appears as Eymundar þáttr hrings in the Flatey Book and the other one is an introductory chapter in Yngvars saga víðförla. They deal with the adventures of Varangians in the service of Yaroslav the Wise.

The main difference between the two versions is that in Eymundar þáttr hrings, the hero is a Norwegian, whereas in Yngvars saga víðförla, he is a Swede. In the version where he is Swedish, he is the relative of Erik the Victorious.

== See also ==
- Boris and Gleb
