= Sviatopolk I of Kiev =

Grand Prince of Kiev from 1015 to 1019

Sviatopolk I the Accursed
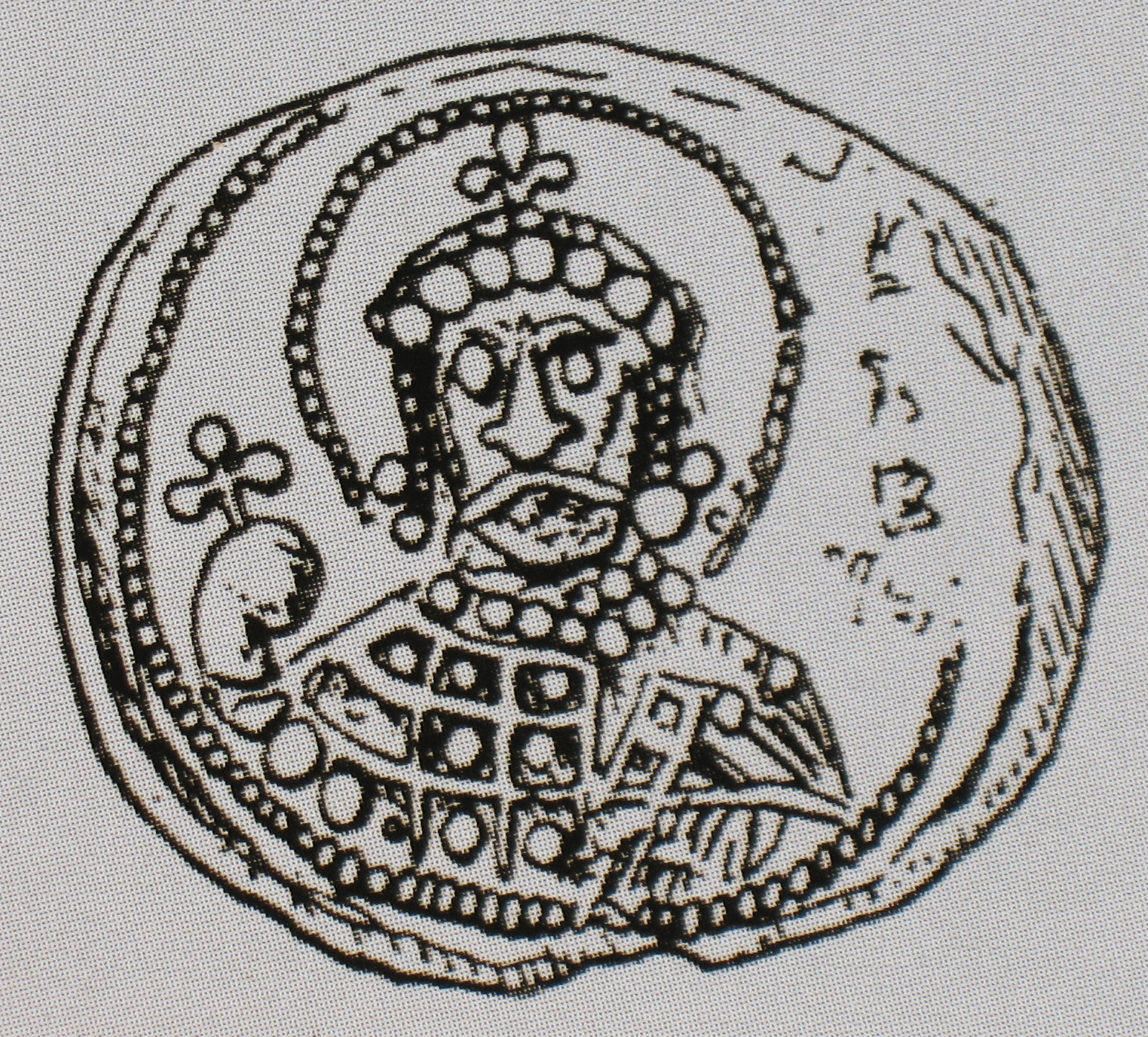
- Seal of Sviatopolk I

Grand Prince of Kiev
- Reign: 1015–1019
- Predecessor: Vladimir the Great
- Successor: Yaroslav the Wise

Prince of Turov
- Reign: 988–1019
- Born: ~980
- Died: 1019 (aged ~39)
- Spouse: daughter of Bolesław I the Brave
Names
- Sviatopolk Vladimirovich
- Dynasty: Rurik
- Father: Yaropolk I or Vladimir the Great
- Mother: Irina, Grand Princess of Kiev
- Religion: Chalcedonian Christianity
- Sign

Sviatopolk I Vladimirovich (also called Sviatopolk the Accursed or the Accursed Prince; Old East Slavic: Свѧтоплъкъ, romanized: Svętoplŭkŭ; (Note: Russian: Святополк Окаянный; Ukrainian: Святополк Окаянний) c. 980 – 1019) was Prince of Turov from 988 to 1015 and Grand Prince of Kiev from 1015 to 1019. He earned his sobriquet after allegedly murdering his brothers during his bid to take the throne. His actual responsibility is disputed by historians.

The Svyatopolk-Mirsky family of Rurikid origin attribute their descent from Sviatopolk. Tsar Peter the Great recognized their descent during his reign.

== Early life ==
Sviatopolk's mother was a Greek nun captured by Sviatoslav I in Bulgaria and married to his lawful heir Yaropolk I, who became the prince in 972. In 980, Yaropolk's brother Vladimir had him murdered, and the new sovereign married his predecessor's wife, who gave birth to a child. Thus, Sviatopolk may have been the eldest of Vladimir's sons, although his parentage has been questioned.

When Sviatopolk was eight years old, Vladimir put him in charge of Turov and later arranged his marriage with the daughter of Bolesław I the Brave of Poland. The young princess came to Turov together with Reinbern, the Bishop of Kolberg (now Kołobrzeg). Dissatisfied with Vladimir and encouraged by his own wife and Reinbern, Sviatopolk began preparations for war against Vladimir, probably counting on support from his father-in-law. Vladimir soon discovered Sviatopolk's intentions, however, and threw him, his wife and Reinbern in prison, where Reinbern died.

== Biography according to domestic sources ==
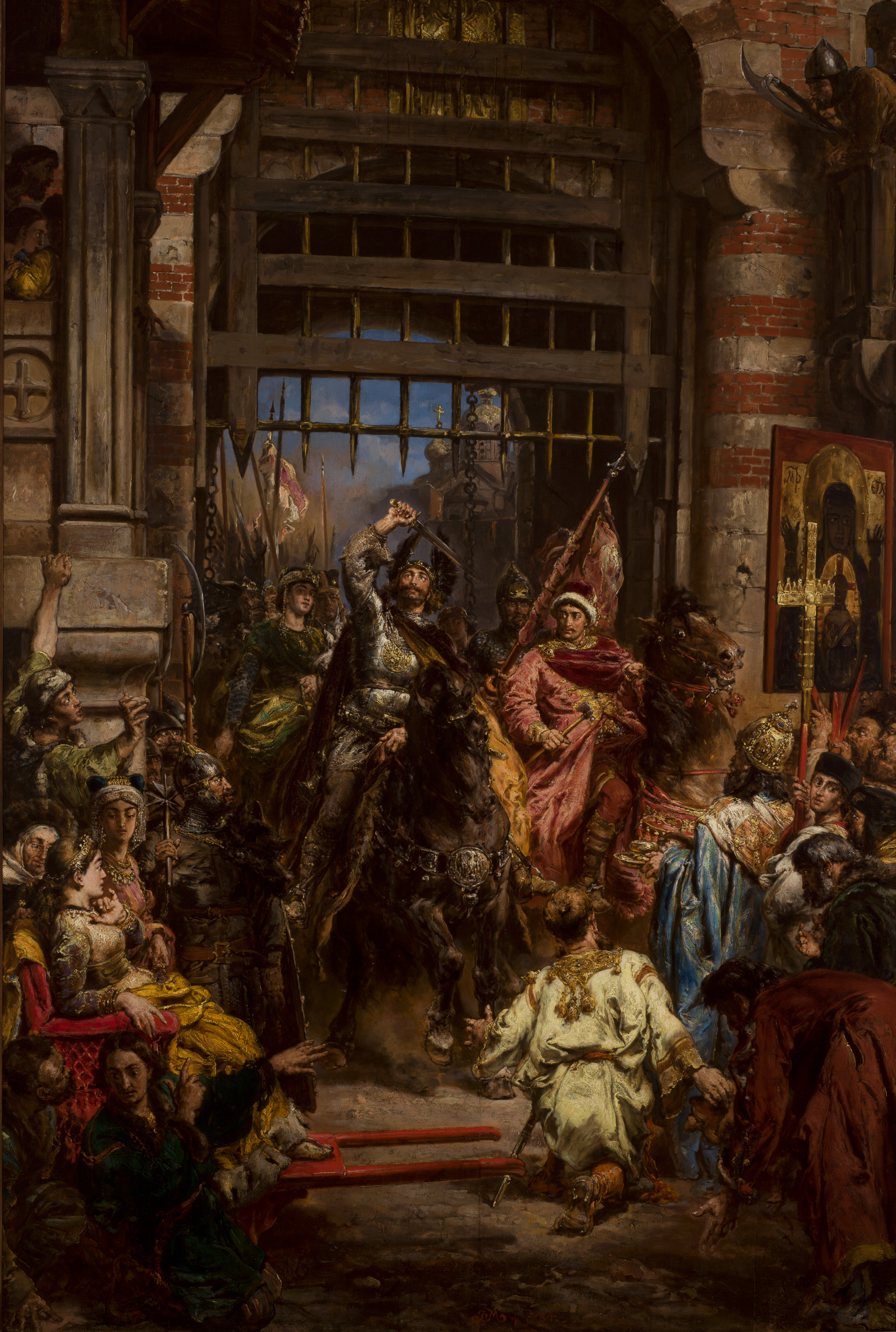
Jan Matejko, Sviatopolk (in red) with Bolesław the Brave at the Golden Gate in Kiev

The primary domestic source is the Primary Chronicle. Not long before Vladimir's death, Sviatopolk was freed from prison. In 1015, Sviatopolk's retinue concealed Vladimir's death from him to prevent him from claiming the Kievan throne. When Sviatopolk learned of Vladimir's demise, he seized power in Kiev almost immediately.

The citizens of Kiev did not show much sympathy for Sviatopolk and, therefore, he decided to distribute presents in order to win them over. Then, he decided to rid himself of three of Vladimir's sons, Boris, Gleb, and Sviatoslav, whose claims for the Kievan throne threatened his power. Boris presented the most danger to him because he had been in charge of Vladimir's druzhina (personal guards) and army, and enjoyed the support of the citizens.

He sent the boyars of Vyshgorod to execute Boris. Boris and his manservant were stabbed to death when sleeping in a tent. The prince was discovered still breathing when his body was being transported in a bag to Kiev, but the Varangians put him out of his misery with the thrust of a lance.

Sviatopolk's cold-blooded reprisal earned him the nickname of the Accursed (Russian: Окаянный). The news of this triple murder reached another son of Vladimir, Yaroslav, Prince of Novgorod, who decided to go to war against Sviatopolk with the support from the citizens of Novgorod and the Varangians. The battle took place in 1016 not far from Lubech, near the Dnieper river. Sviatopolk was defeated and fled to Poland.

In 1018, he returned to Rus', defeated Yaroslav with help from his father-in-law and seized Kiev. Bolesław of Poland and his army remained in Rus' for several months, but later returned to Poland, seizing some Cherven towns on the way.

Meanwhile, the posadnik Konstantin Dobrynich and other citizens of Novgorod persuaded Yaroslav to go to war against Kiev once again. Sviatopolk was defeated and fled to the steppes. Soon he returned with the Pecheneg army and attacked Yaroslav on the Alta River, but was once again defeated and fled to Poland, dying on his way there in July 1019. Sviatopolk may have been murdered by a descendant of Valuk Conqueror (Wallux dux Winedorum) who in 1018 helped him and his father-in-law Bolesław I in expedition against Yaroslav.

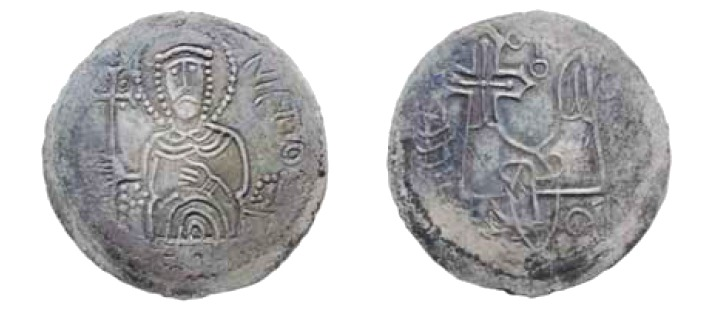
Sviatopolk's silver srebrenik

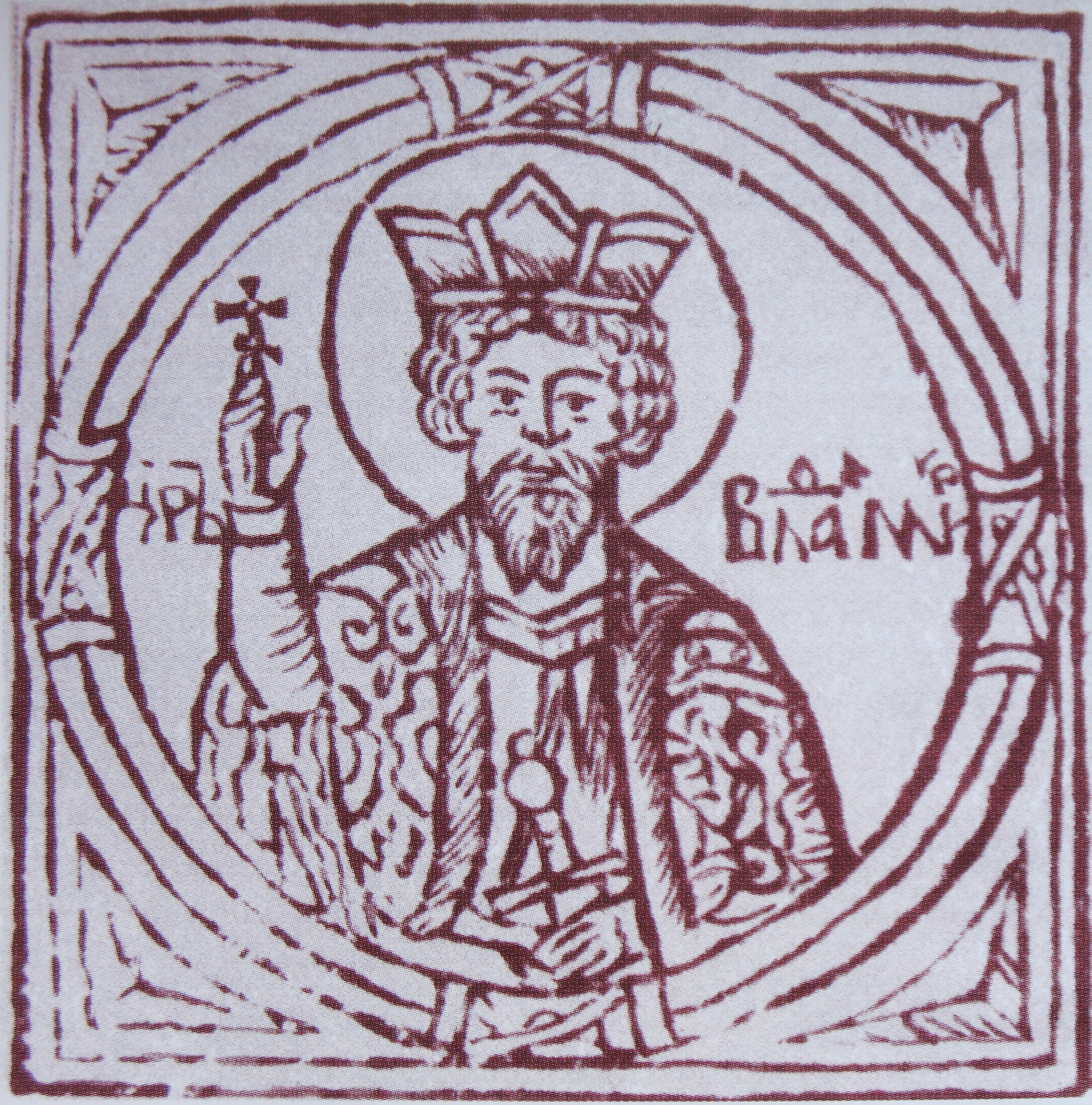
A miniature of Vladimir the Great from a 17th-century Menaion

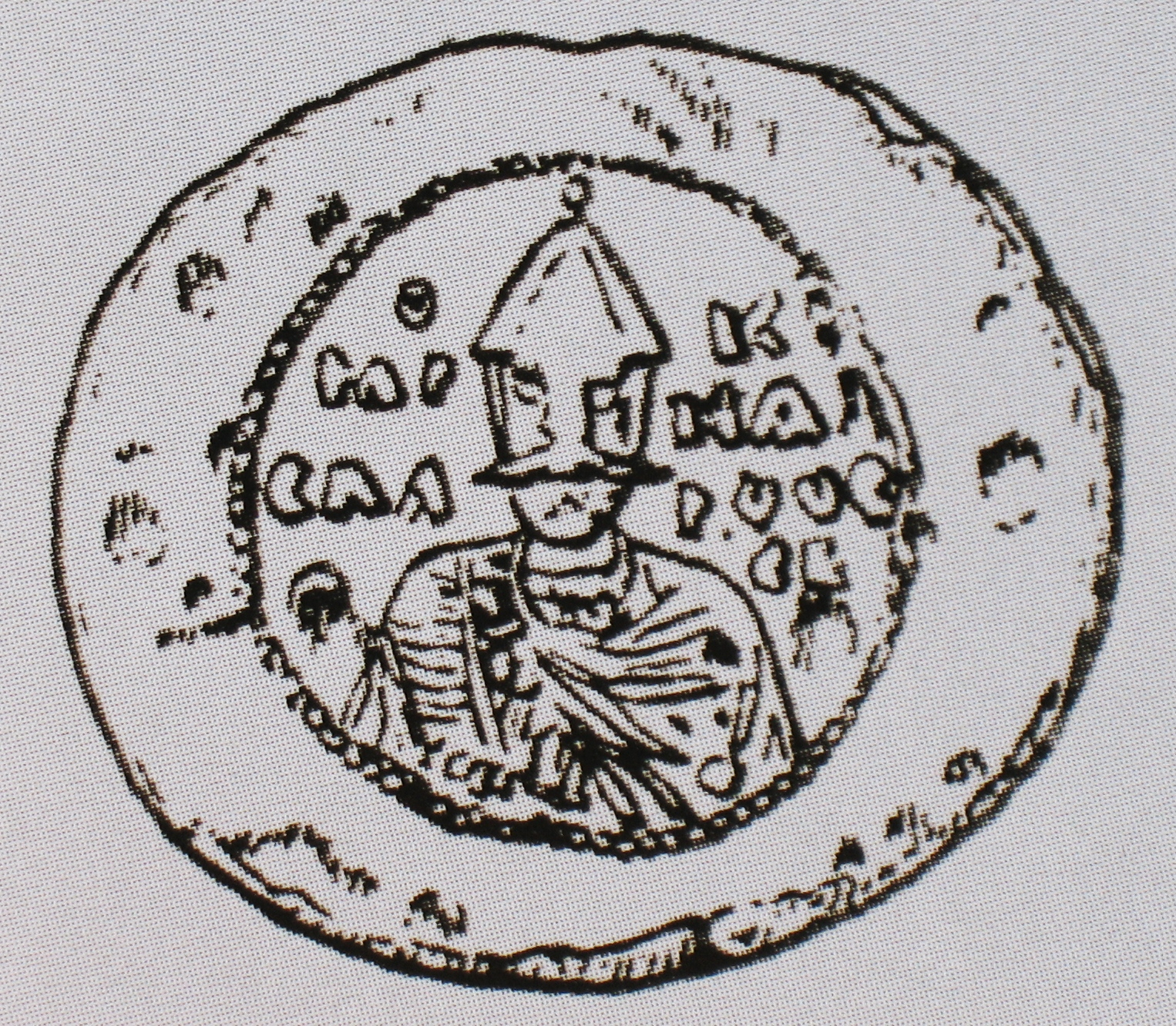
The seal of Yaroslav the Wise

== Biography according to foreign sources ==
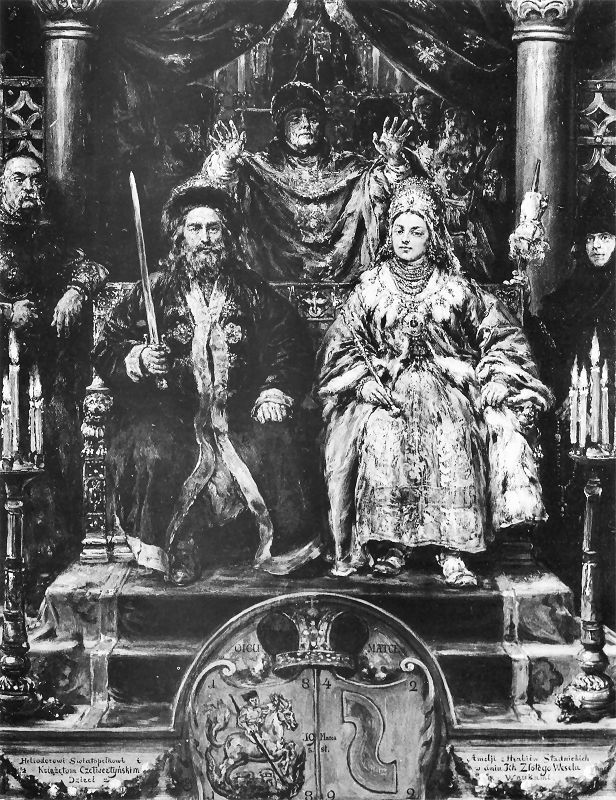
Wedding of Sviatopolk (1892) by Jan Matejko

During the last century, the traditional account of Sviatopolk's career has been somewhat modified. It has been argued that it was Boris who succeeded Vladimir in Kiev, while Sviatopolk was still in prison. One Norse saga called Eymund's saga (a part of Yngvars saga víðförla), with remarkable details, puts on Yaroslav the blame of his brother Burizlaf's murder. This Burizlaf, however, may be Sviatopolk (whose troops were commanded by the Polish duke Bolesław; the latter name is also rendered as Burizlaf in some sagas) as well as Boris.

Therefore, it has been suggested that Sviatopolk ascended the throne after Boris's assassination and tried to fend off Yaroslav's attacks as well as to punish his agents guilty of Boris's murder. The chronicle of Thietmar of Merseburg, who died in 1018, could have been regarded as the only contemporary and unbiased account of events, save that Thietmar's data may have been supplied by Sviatopolk himself during his brief exile at the Polish court. Unfortunately it can be interpreted ambiguously as far as the question of Sviatopolk's guilt is concerned. One place in his chronicle can be interpreted as Sviatopolk escaping from Kiev to Poland immediately after his father's death.

But Thietmar states that Bolesław supported his son-in-law against Yaroslav in 1017, which is the date, according to the Primary Chronicle, of Sviatopolk's first defeat by Yaroslav. Preparing a campaign against Kiev, Bolesław abruptly stopped a successful war against the German Emperor Henry II. So, it is unlikely that Sviatopolk had been present at his court since 1015, which is often supposed by the historians who consider Sviatopolk guilty of Boris and Gleb's murders.

== Archeological record ==
The I-S2077 subclade of Y-DNA haplogroup I-Z63 was sampled on an elite warrior buried in Bodzia Cemetery in a rich burial from ca. 1010–1020 AD. All artefacts there indicate a strong relation to the Kievan Rus' ruling elite, so this man who probably succumbed to combat wounds, was closely related to Sviatopolk. The cemetery in Bodzia is exceptional in terms of Scandinavian and Kievan Rus' links. The Bodzia man (sample VK157, or burial E864/I) was not a simple warrior from the princely retinue, but he belonged to the princely family himself.

His burial is the richest one in the whole cemetery, and strontium analysis of his tooth enamel shows he was not local. It is assumed that he came to Poland with Sviatopolk, and met a violent death in combat. This corresponds to the events of 1018 AD when Sviatopolk disappeared after having retreated from Kiev to Poland. It cannot be excluded that the Bodzia man was Sviatopolk.

== Notes ==
Sviatopolk I of Kiev Rurik Born: 979 Died: 1019
Regnal titles
Preceded by established	Prince of Turov; 987–1019	Succeeded by annexed
Preceded by Vladimir I	Grand Prince of Kiev; 1015–1019	Succeeded by Yaroslav I
Titles in pretence
Preceded by Vysheslav Vladimirovich	Grand Prince of Kiev; 1010–1015	Succeeded by Yaroslav the Wise
Preceded by title established	2nd in line Grand Prince of Kiev; 1000–1010	Succeeded by Yaroslav the Wise
