= Janet L. B. Martin =

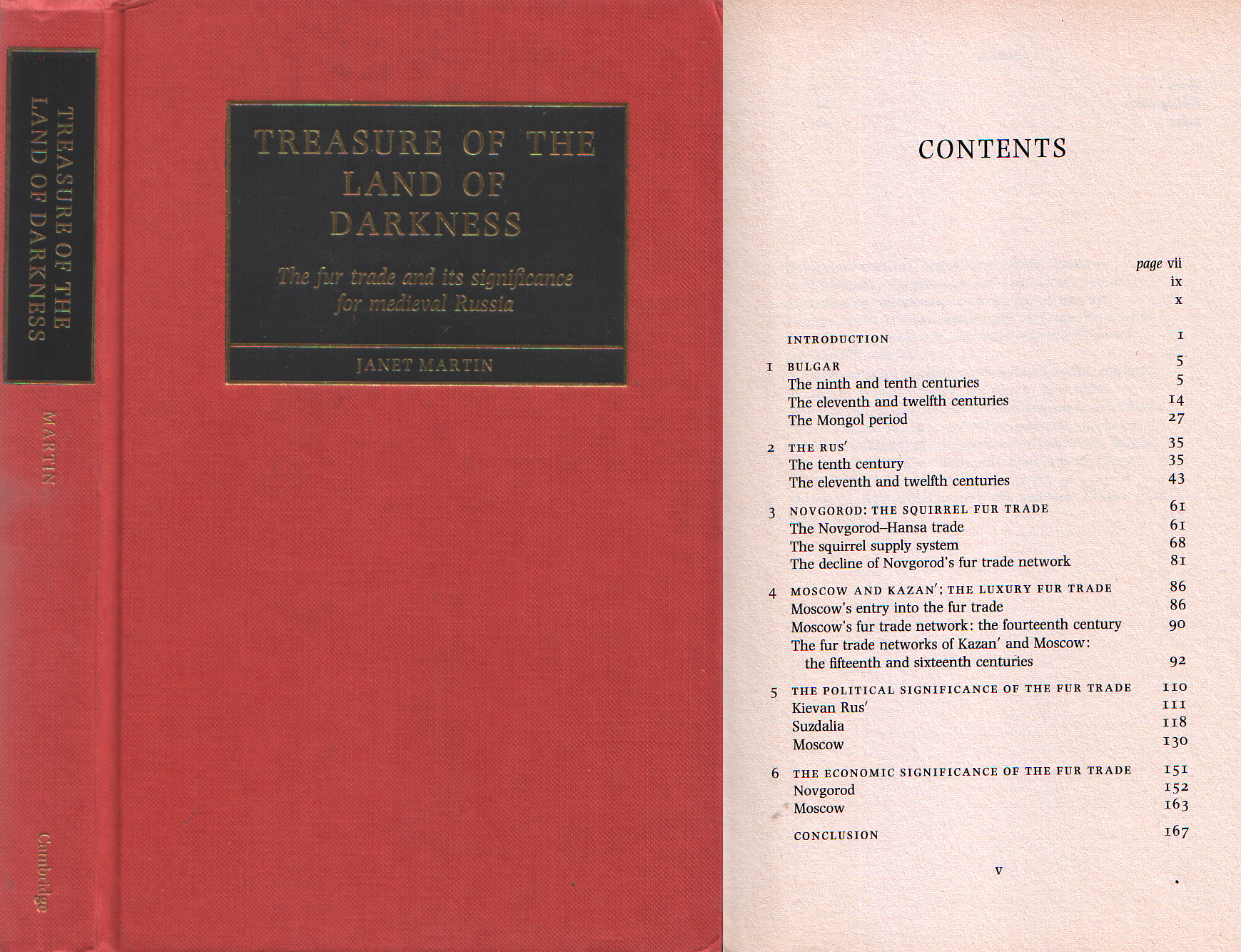
Treasure of the Land of Darkness (1986) by Janet Martin

Janet Louise Block Martin (born 24 January 1945) is an American historian specialising in Old East Slavic literature and medieval history of Kievan Rus' and its successors. She is Professor Emerita at the Department of History at the University of Miami.

== Biography ==
Martin obtained her PhD in Russian history at the University of Chicago in 1980. Her PhD dissertation was titled Treasure of the Land of Darkness: A Study of the Fur Trade and its Significance for Medieval Russia (X-XVI Centuries). Reviewer Maureen Helena Berry (1982) called the variety of sources Martin used "impressive".

== Works ==
=== Monographs ===
- Martin, Janet, Treasure of the Land of Darkness: A Study of the Fur Trade and its Significance for Medieval Russia (X-XVI Centuries) (1980). University of Chicago. PhD dissertation.
  - Martin, J. (2004). Treasure of the Land of Darkness: The Fur Trade and Its Significance for Medieval Russia. Cambridge University Press. ISBN 978-0-521-54811-3. (based on her 1980 PhD dissertation, originally published in 1986)
- Martin, Janet (1993). Medieval Russia: 980–1584. Cambridge: Cambridge University Press. ISBN 0521368324. (original). Later editions:
  - Martin, Janet (1995). Medieval Russia: 980–1584. New York: Cambridge University Press. ISBN 0521362768. (first published)
  - Martin, Janet (2004). Medieval Russia: 980–1584. Cambridge: Cambridge University Press. ISBN 9780521368322. Archived from the original on 23 April 2023. (digital printing 2004)
  - Martin, Janet (2007). Medieval Russia: 980–1584. Second Edition. E-book. Cambridge: Cambridge University Press. ISBN 978-0-511-36800-4.
- Engel, B.A.; Martin, J. (2015). Russia in World History. New Oxford world history. Oxford University Press. ISBN 978-0-19-994789-8.

=== Book chapters (selection) ===
- Martin, Janet (2009a). "Chapter Three: The First East Slavic State". A Companion to Russian History. Chichester: John Wiley & Sons. pp. 34–50. ISBN 9781444308426.
- Martin, Janet (2009b). "From Kiev to Muscovy: The Beginnings to 1450". In Freeze, Gregory (ed.). Russia: A History. Oxford: Oxford University Press. pp. 1–30. ISBN 978-0-19-150121-0. Archived from the original on 27 January 2023. (third edition)

=== Journal articles (selection) ===
- Lenhoff, Gail D.; Martin, Janet L. B. (1989). "The Commercial and Cultural Context of Afanasij Nikitin's Journey Beyond Three Seas". Jahrbücher für Geschichte Osteuropas. 37 (3). Franz Steiner Verlag: 321–344. ISSN 0021-4019. JSTOR 41048307.
- Martin, Janet (2006). "Calculating Seniority and the Contests for Succession in Kievan Rus'". Russian History. 33 (2/4). Brill: 267–281. ISSN 1876-3316. JSTOR 24664444.
- Martin, Janet (2007). "Two Pomeshchiki From the Novgorod Lands: Their Fates and Fortunes During the Livonian War". Russian History. 34 (1–4): 239–253. doi:10.1163/187633107X00130. ISSN 0094-288X.
