= Boris and Gleb =

Kievan Rus' princely saints (11th cent.)

Saints Boris and Gleb
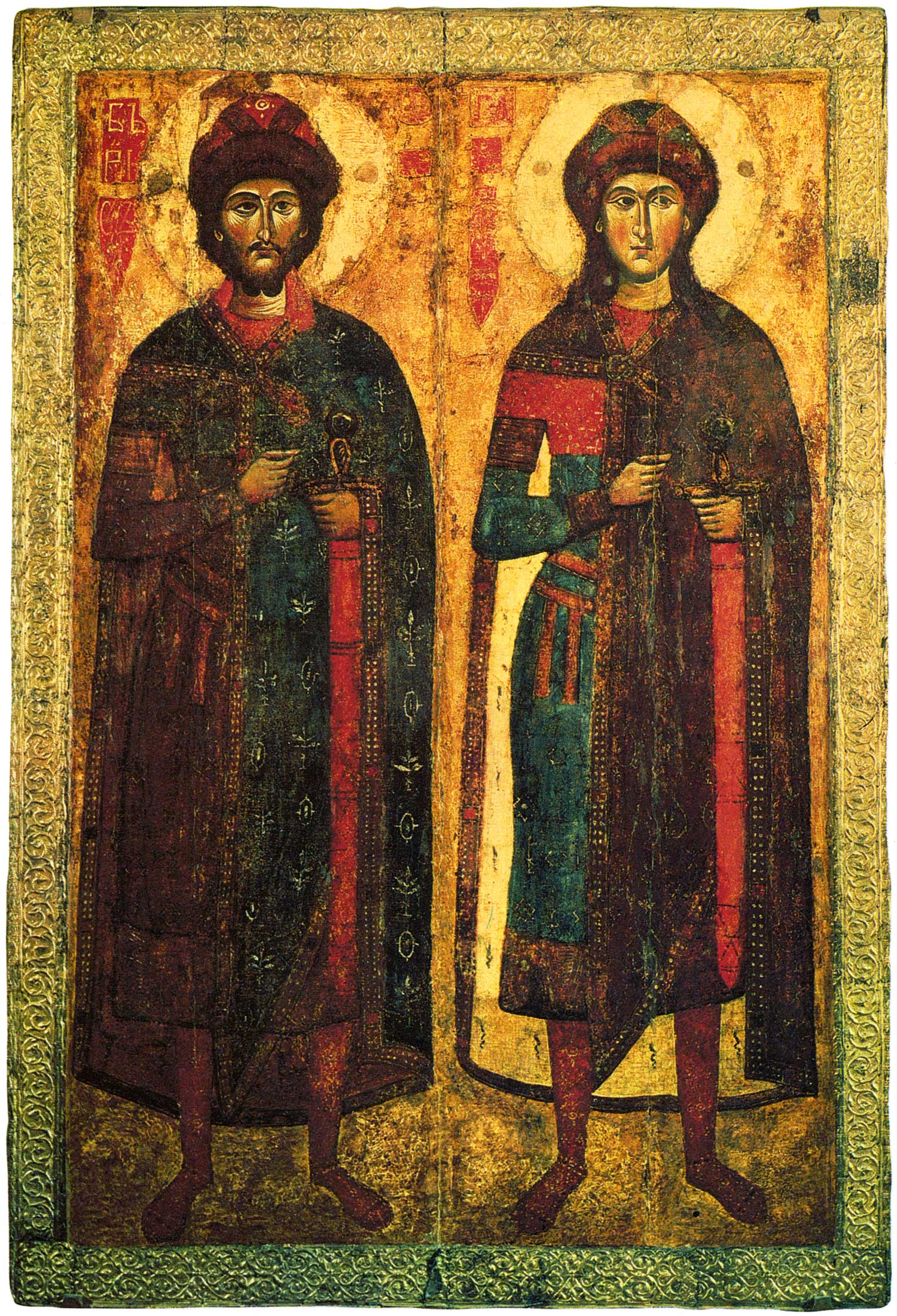
- 13th or 14th century icon

Passion Bearers
- Born: Unknown
- Died: c. 1015–1019
- Venerated in: Eastern Orthodoxy; Catholic Church
- Canonized: 1071, Kievan Rus' by the Metropolis of Kiev and all Rus'; 1724, Papal State by Pope Benedict XIII
- Major shrine: Vyshhorod
- Feast: July 24 (Martyrdom); May 3 (Translation of Relics)
- Attributes: Two young princes, holding swords or spears, or the cross of martyrs
- Patronage: Russian Railway Troops

Boris
- Prince of Rostov
- Reign: 1010–1015
- Predecessor: Yaroslav the Wise
- Born: 986
- Died: 1015; Kiev
- Burial: Church of St. Basil, Vyshhorod
Names
- Boris Vladimirovich
- House: Rurik
- Father: Vladimir I of Kiev
- Mother: Adela

Gleb
- Prince of Murom
- Reign: 1013–1015
- Born: 987
- Died: 1015
- Burial: Church of St. Basil, Vyshhorod
Names
- Gleb Vladimirovich
- House: Rurik
- Father: Vladimir I of Kiev
- Mother: Adela

Boris and Gleb (Old East Slavic: Борисъ и Глѣбъ, romanized: Borisŭ i Glěbŭ), (Note: Russian: Борис и Глеб, romanized: Boris i Gleb; Ukrainian: Борис і Гліб, romanized: Borys i Hlib) respective Christian names Roman (Романъ, Romanŭ) and David (Давꙑдъ, Davydŭ), were the first saints canonized in Kievan Rus' after its Christianization. Their feast day is observed on July 24 (August 6 Gregorian calendar).

== History ==
According to the two 11th-century Lives of Boris and Gleb, ascribed to Nestor the Hagiographer and Jacob the Monk, they were younger children of Vladimir the Great, who favored them over his other children. The Primary Chronicle claims that their mother was a Bulgarian woman, even though this was most likely not true as their mother, Anna Porphyrogenita, was the daughter of Romanos II a Byzantine emperor of Armenian origin, and Theophano (born Anastaso), a Laconian Greek princess of Armenian origin, tracing her ancestry to the Mamikonian dynasty. Boris married and ruled the town of Rostov, was probably regarded as heir apparent to the Kievan throne. Gleb, who was still a minor, ruled the easternmost town of Murom.

Both brothers were murdered during the Kievan succession crisis of 1015–1019. The Primary Chronicle blames Sviatopolk the Accursed for plotting their assassinations. Boris learns of his father's death upon his return with the Rus' army to Alta. Informed of Sviatopolk's accession to the throne and urged to replace him, Boris replies: "Be it not for me to raise my hand against my elder brother. Now that my father has passed away, let him take the place of my father in my heart."

Despite Boris' acquiescence, Sviatopolk sends Putsha and the boyars of Vyshegorod to execute his brother. Boris and his Hungarian manservant, George, are stabbed to death while asleep in a tent. The prince is discovered still breathing in a bodybag being transported to Kiev, but the Varangians end his life with the thrust of a sword.

Sent for by Sviatopolk, Gleb believes his father is still alive and rushes to his father's deathbed. On the way, their brother Yaroslav learns of Sviatopolk's treachery and urges Gleb not to meet him. In the middle of praying to his deceased brother and God, Gleb is assassinated by his own cook, Torchin, who cuts his throat with a kitchen knife.

The Life contains many picturesque details of Boris and Gleb's last hours, such as their sister's warning about the murderous plans of Sviatopolk. The narrative is a masterpiece of hagiography that weaves together numerous literary traditions. The factual circumstances of Boris and Gleb's lives and deaths cannot, however, be extrapolated from their hagiography. Perhaps the crucial evidence comes from several unbiased foreign sources, which mention that Boris succeeded his father in Kiev and was not lurking in Rostov as the Russian Primary Chronicle seems to imply.

The Norse Eymund's saga relates a tale of the Varangian warriors who were hired by Yaroslav I the Wise to kill his brother Burizleif. Some historians trust the saga more than sources from Rus', claiming that it was Yaroslav and not Sviatopolk who was interested in removing his political rivals and was guilty of his brothers' murder. Others consider "Burizleif" a misreading of Bolesław, the Polish ruler allied to Sviatopolk.

== Veneration ==
Boris and Gleb received the crown of martyrdom in 1015. The brothers became known as "Strastoterptsy" (Passion-Bearers), since they did not resist evil with violence. Boris and Gleb's relics were housed in the Church of St. Basil in Vyshhorod, later destroyed.

Boris and Gleb were glorified (canonized) by the Orthodox church in Rus' in 1071. They were interred at the Vyshhorod Cathedral, which was reconsecrated in their name. Many other Russian churches were later named after them.

In 1095, parts of the relics of both saints were moved to Sázava Monastery in Duchy of Bohemia and inserted into one of the altars.

The Catholic Church canonized the brothers in 1724, during the papacy of Benedict XIII. In 2011 a monument to Boris and Gleb was erected in Vyshhorod, Ukraine. The authors of the monument are Boris Krylov and Oles Sydoruk.

=== Feast Day ===
- 2 May – translation of relics (1115), (with: Boris I of Bulgaria),
- 20 May – translation of relics (1024 and 1072),
- 15 July – main commemoration, Boris martyrdom date,
- 5 September – commemoration of Gleb martyrdom date,

==== Fixed Feast Day (Synaxes) ====
- 23 May – Synaxis of All Saints of Rostov and Yaroslavl,
- 23 June – Synaxis of All Saints of Vladimir,
- 10 July – Synaxis of All Saints of Ryazan (ROC),
- 15 July – Synaxis of All Saints of Kiev (ROC),
- 22 September – Synaxis of All Saints of Tula,
- 22 September – Synaxis of All Saints of Poltava [Ukrainian Orthodox Church (Moscow Patriarchate)],

==== Moveable Feast Day (Synaxes) ====
- Synaxis of All Saints of Smolensk – movable holiday on the Sunday before July 28.

== Gallery ==
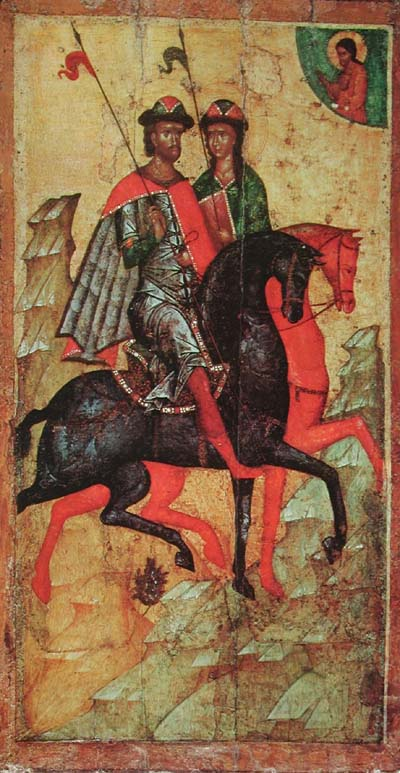
Icon of Saints Boris and Gleb on horseback. Moscow, mid 14th century (Tretyakov Gallery).
