= 1174–1177 Suzdalian war of succession =

1174–1177 war of succession in Vladimir-Suzdal

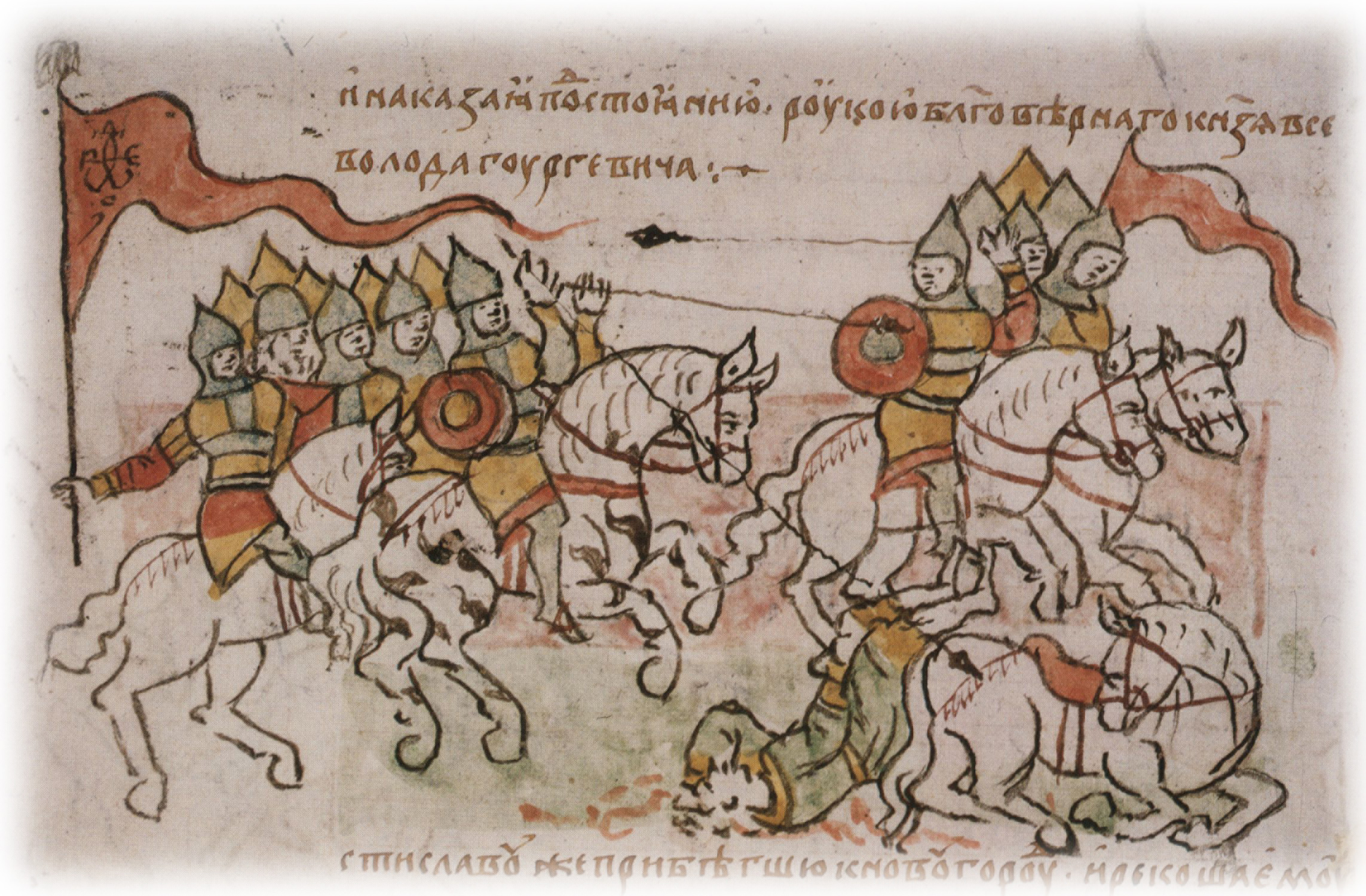
1176 battle of Lipitsa: Vsevolod Yurievich defeats Mstislav Rostislavich. Image from the Radziwiłł Chronicle.

The Suzdalian war of succession of 1174–1177 was a war of succession in Vladimir-Suzdal (Suzdalia), a complex of principalities in the northeast of Kievan Rus'. The casus belli was the assassination of prince Andrey Bogolyubsky on 28 June 1174 by his own boyars. Immediately, his surviving step-brothers, son and nephews started fighting amongst themselves about who had the right to succeed him. The conflict would not be resolved until Vsevolod Yurievich "the Big Nest" had defeated his other brothers and his nephews, and seized power across Suzdalia in 1177.

== Belligerents ==
Yurievichi family tree

Aepa son of Osen''s daughter; Yuri's first wife	Yuri Dolgorukiy; Prince of Suzdal; 1108/25–1157	Helena; Yuri's second wife
Rostislav; Prince of Pereyaslavl; 1149–1151	Ivan (died 1154)	Olga; Princess of Galicia; 1153–1189	Andrey; Prince of Vladimir; 1155/62–1174	Maria; Princess of Novgorod- Seversk (died 1166)	Sviatoslav (died 20; January 1174)	Yaroslav (died 1166)	Gleb; Prince of Kiev; 1169–1171	Boris; Prince of Turov (died 1159)	Mstislav (died 1166)	Vasilko; Prince of Novgorod (deposed 1161)
Mstislav; Rostislavich	Yaropolk; Rostislavich	Euphrosyne; Princess of Ryazan	Yury; Bogolyubsky	Mikhalko Yurievich (died 1176)	Vsevolod "the Big Nest"	Yaropolk; Yurievich

Died before the conflict began
Cause of the conflict: assassination of Andrey Bogolyubsky
Claimants to the throne: the Rostislavichi (Andrey's nephews)
Claimant to the throne: Yury Bogolyubsky (Andrey's son)
Claimants to the throne: the Yurievichi (Andrey's step-brothers)

Andrey's son Yury Bogolyubsky was dethroned as prince of Novgorod shortly after Andrey's murder. Yury fled to the Caucasus, playing no role in the Suzdalian succession crisis.

The two belligerent factions became Andrey's nephews the Rostislavichi, and Andrey's step-brothers the Yurievichi.

=== Rostislavichi ===
Yaropolk Rostislavich and Mstislav Rostislavich "the Eyeless" were the sons of Rostislav Yuryevich (died 1151), the older brother of Andrey by Yuri Dolgorukiy's first wife. Their power base was in Rostov and Suzdal in the north, where the boyars supported them. They would ally themselves with the princes of Smolensk, Ryazan (their sister Euphrosyne Rostislavich was married to prince Gleb of Ryazan), Murom, Polotsk, and Vitebsk (Yaropolk married prince Vseslav's daughter in the winter of 1174–75).

=== Yurievichi ===
Mikhail or "Mikhalko" Yurievich of Vladimir and Vsevolod Yurievich "the Big Nest" were the sons of Yuri Dolgorukiy by his second wife Helena, and thus Andrey's step-brothers. Their power base was in Vladimir on the Klyazma in the south, as well as Chernigov (modern Chernihiv), the capital of their Olgovichi allies.

Although the nephews and step-brothers of Andrey would shortly after his death agree to recognise Mikhalko as the senior prince, with the title of prince of Vladimir, conflict soon erupted nevertheless.

== List of battles ==
The northeastern Rus' principalities of Vladimir-Suzdal and their neighbours (1216)

- Siege of Vladimir (1174) by Yaropolk Rostislavich for seven weeks, with Mikhalko Yurievich defending the city from within until the inhabitants demanded that he surrender to end their misery. Yaropolk was recognised as prince of Vladimir, and Mstislav as prince of Rostov.
- Novgorod-Seversk – Chernigov conflict (1174), when Oleg II Svyatoslavich, Prince of Novgorod-Seversk and husband of the Rostislavichi's aunt Maria, attacked the Yurievichi-allied Olgovichi of Chernigov. Oleg sacked Lutava and Morovsk, and unsuccessfully besieged Starodub, plundering its countryside. The Olgovichi then besieged Novgorod-Seversk, after which they made peace.
- Battle of the Belekhov plain near Zagor'je (15 June 1175), with the Yurievichi defeating the Rostislavichi and recapturing Vladimir. Mikhalko Yurievich was again recognised as prince of Vladimir.
- Battle of Lipitsa (1176), 27 June 1176, Vladimirian and Chernigovian troops of Vsevolod Yurievich defeated the Rostovian forces under Mstislav Rostislavich.
- Battle of Koloksha (1177), 7 March 1177, Yurievichi forces of Vladimir, Chernigov and Pereyaslavl defeated the Rostislavichi forces of Rostov, Suzdal', and Ryazan. Decisive Yurievichi victory; Vsevolod became the undisputed prince of Vladimir, imprisoning and blinding the Rostislavichi brothers.

== Aftermath ==
The war of succession devastated Suzdalia, leading to infighting, killing and the widely-condemned mutilation of the Rostislavichi brothers within its reigning clan, war-time violence and destruction, and the loss of control over Novgorod. More importantly, due to Andrey's death, the Yurievichi clan also dropped out of the competition for the Kievan throne, never seeking it again, supporting Rurik Rostislavich's accession in 1194. Instead, Vsevolod would focus only on their patrimony in Vladimir-Suzdal, and the neighbouring principalities of Ryazan and Murom (which they did manage to seize control of, at the loss of their previous Olgovichi overlords), and on regaining control of the Novgorod Republic, although the Yurievichi clan would not do so again for another decade.

With the death of Vsevolod in 1212, the Yurievichi definitively lost their right to sit on the throne of Kiev. It also triggered yet another war of succession in Vladimir-Suzdal (1212–1216).

== See also ==
- List of wars involving Kievan Rus'
- Kievan succession crisis of 1015–1019
- Siege of Vyshgorod (1173), which precipitated Andrey's murder
- Battle of Lipitsa (1216), which decided the 1212–1216 Vladimir-Suzdal war of succession upon Vsevolod the Big Nest's death

== Bibliography ==
=== Primary sources ===
- Kievan Chronicle (c. 1200)
  - (modern English translation) Heinrich, Lisa Lynn (1977). The Kievan Chronicle: A Translation and Commentary (PhD diss.). Nashville, Tennessee: Vanderbilt University. p. 616. ProQuest 7812419
- Suzdalian Chronicle (c. 1203)
- Novgorod First Chronicle (c. 1275)

=== Literature ===
- Dimnik, Martin (2015). "Prince Svyatoslav Vsevolodovich of Chernigov, Kingmaker in Suzdalia (1174–1179)" (PDF). Сіверщина в історії України [Siveria in Ukrainian History]. Національний заповідник «Глухів»: 95–96.
- Martin, Janet (2007). Medieval Russia: 980–1584. Second Edition. E-book. Cambridge: Cambridge University Press. ISBN 978-0-511-36800-4.
- Pelenski, Jaroslaw (1988). "The Contest for the "Kievan Succession" (1155–1175): The Religious-Ecclesiastical Dimension". Harvard Ukrainian Studies. 12/13: 761–780. JSTOR 41036344.
- Raffensperger, Christian; Ostrowski, Donald (2023). The Ruling Families of Rus: Clan, Family and Kingdom. London: Reaktion Books. p. 309. ISBN 978-1-78914-745-2. (e-book)
