= Budnik =

Budnik may refer to:

- Budnik (Bulgarian), a Christmas tradition in Bulgaria
- Budnik (hamlet), a hamlet in Pskov Oblast, Russia
- Budnik (surname)
