= Berindei (disambiguation) =

Berindei is a medieval Turkic tribe.

Berindei may also refer to:

== Places ==
- Berindei, village in Dăneasa commune, Olt County, Romania

== People ==
- Anton Berindei (1838–1899), Romanian politician and general officer
- Dan Berindei (1923–2021), Romanian historian
- Mihnea Berindei (1948–2016), Romanian-born French historian
