= Prince of Novgorod =

Monarch during a period of Russian history

- Князь новгородский
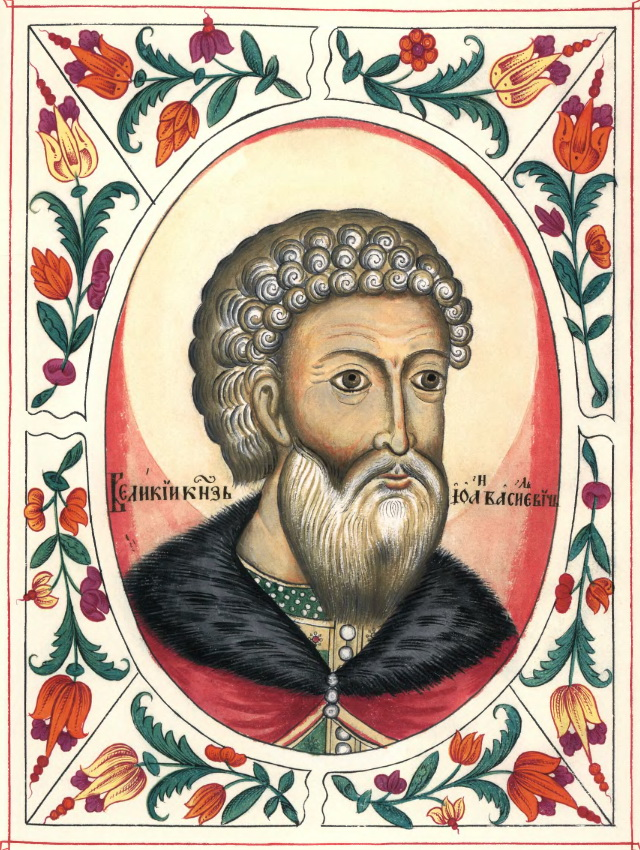
- Last to Reign; Ivan III; 27 March 1462 – 15 January 1478

Details
- Last monarch: Ivan III of Russia
- Abolished: 15 January 1478

The Prince of Novgorod (Russian: князь новгородский, romanized: knyaz novgorodsky) was the title of the ruler of Novgorod in present-day Russia. From 1136, it was the title of the figurehead leader of the Novgorod Republic.

The position was originally an appointed one until the late 11th or early 12th century, then became something of an elective one until the early 14th century, after which the grand prince of Vladimir (who was almost always the prince of Moscow) was almost invariably the prince of Novgorod as well.

The title originates sometime in the 9th century when, according to tradition, the Varangian chieftain Rurik and his brothers were invited to rule over the East Slavic and Finnic tribes of northwest Russia, but reliable information about it dates only to the late 10th century when Vladimir, the youngest son of Sviatoslav I, was made the prince of Novgorod.

During the reign of Ivan III, the title was restored and Novgorod was included in the title of the Russian monarch, which lasted until the abdication of Nicholas II of Russia in 1917. After Novgorod was formally annexed by Moscow in 1478, Ivan assumed the title of sovereign of all Russia.

== History ==
From the early 12th century, the prince's power in the Novgorod Republic was more nominal. Imperial and Soviet-era scholars often argued that the office was ineffectual after 1136, when Prince Vsevolod Mstislavich was dismissed by the Novgorodians, and that Novgorod could invite and dismiss its princes at will. In this way, the prince of Novgorod was no longer the "ruler" of Novgorod but became an elective or appointed official of the city-state.

That being said, the traditional view of the prince being invited in or dismissed at will is an oversimplification of a long and complex history of the office. In fact, from the late 10th century until its formal annexation in 1478, the princes of Novgorod were dismissed and invited only about half the time, and the vast majority of these cases occurred between 1095 and 1293, and not consistently so during that period. That is, the office was elective for perhaps two centuries and even then it was not always elective. Even during this period, the nadir of princely power in the city, more powerful princes could assert their power independently over the city, as did Mstislav the Bold in the early 13th century, Alexander Nevsky in the 1240s and 1250s, his brother Iaroslav in the 1260s and 1270s, and others.

According to a remark in the chronicles, Novgorod had the right, after 1196, to pick their prince of their own free will, but again, evidence suggests that even after that, princes were chosen and dismissed only about half the time, and Novgorod often chose the most powerful prince in Rus' as their prince. That usually meant that the prince in Kiev, Vladimir or Moscow (who retained the title of grand prince of Vladimir from about the 1320s onward, although there were several interruptions), either took the title himself or appointed his son or other relative to be prince of Novgorod. At times other princes, from Tver, the Grand Duchy of Lithuania, and elsewhere, also vied for the Novgorodian throne. Thus, Novgorod did not really choose its prince, but considering the political climate, they often very prudently went with the most senior or most powerful prince in the land if he did not impose himself (or his candidate) upon them.

What was different about Novgorod, then, was not so much that Novgorod could freely choose its princes – it could not. Rather, what was unique was that no princely dynasty managed to establish itself within the city and take permanent control over the city. Rather, while other Rus' cities had established dynasties, the more powerful princes vied for control of Novgorod the Great, a most-desirable city to control given the vast wealth (from trade in furs) that flowed into the city in the medieval period.

In the absence of firmer princely control the local elites, the boyars, took control of the city and the offices of posadnik and tysyatsky became elective. The veche (public assembly) played a not insignificant role in public life, although the precise makeup of the veche and its powers is uncertain and still contested among historians. The posadnik, tysiatsky, and even the local bishop or archbishop (after 1165) were elected at the veche, and it is said the veche invited and dismissed the prince as well.

== List of princes ==
List based on Michael C. Paul (2008).

=== First princes ===
Prince	Born	Reign	Death	Consort	Notes
Rurik I	?	862-879	879	Unknown at least one son	
Oleg the Seer	?	879-912	912	Unknown	Varangian kniaz of Novgorod and Kiev. His relationship with the family is unknown. He was probably a regent, in name of Igor, son of Rurik.
Igor I the Old; Igor Rurikovich	c.878 Son of Rurik I	912-945	945; Iskorosten aged 66–67	901 or 902 at least one son	Son of Rurik.
Saint Olga of Kiev	c.890 Pskov	945-962	11 July 969; Kiev aged 78–79	901 or 902 at least one son	Regent on behalf of her minor son, she was baptized by Emperor Constantine VII but failed to bring Christianity to Kiev.
Sviatoslav I the Brave; Sviatoslav Igorevich	c.942 possibly Kiev; Son of Igor I and Olga	962-969	March 972	Predslava c.954 two children Malusha/Malfrida c.958 at least one son	

=== Dominance of Grand Prince of Kiev (970–1088) ===
From 970 to 1088, the Grand Prince of Kiev was the patron of the Prince of Novgorod.

Prince	Born	Reign	Death	Consort	Notes
Vladimir I the Great; Vladimir Sviatoslavich	c.958 Budnik; Son of Sviatoslav I and Malusha/Malfrida	969-977 979-988	15 July 1015; Berestove, Kiev aged 57–58	Olava/Allogia c.977 at least one son A Greek nun (widow of his brother) c.980 at least one son Rogneda of Polotsk c.978 (possibly in bigamy) eight children Adela (of Bulgaria?) at least two children (maximum four) Malfrida (of Bohemia?); Before 1000 two children Anna Porphyrogenita of Byzantium; 988; Cherson three children Regelindis (?) of Saxony (granddaughter of Otto I, Holy Roman Emperor); After 1011 one or two daughters Unknown two children	His early rule is characterized by a staunch pagan reaction but in 988 he was baptized into Orthodoxy and successfully converted Kievan Rus' to Christianity.
Yaropolk I Yaropolk Sviatoslavich	c.950 Son of Sviatoslav I and Predslava	977-979	980; Fort of Roden, near Kaniv aged 29–30	A Greek nun at least one son	
Viacheslav I Viacheslav Vladimirovich	977; Son of Vladimir I and Olava/Allogia	988-1010	c.1010 Novgorod aged 32–33	Anna before 1052 at least two children	
Yaroslav I the Wise; Yaroslav Vladimirovich	c.978 Son of Vladimir I and Rogneda of Polotsk	1010-1034	20 February 1054; Vyshhorod aged 75–76	Ingigerda of Sweden; 1019; Novgorod eight or nine children	During his reign Kievan Rus' reached the pinnacle of its power.
Vladimir II; Vladimir Yaroslavich	1020; Son of Yaroslav I and Ingigerda of Sweden	1034-1052	4 October 1052; Novgorod aged 31–32	Anna before 1052 at least two children	
Iziaslav I Iziaslav Yaroslavich	c.1024 Son of Yaroslav I and Ingigerda of Sweden	1052-1054	3 October 1078; Nizhyn aged 53–54	Gertrude of Poland; 1043 three children	First King of Rus', Pope Gregory VII sent him a crown from Rome in 1075.
Mstislav I Mstislav Iziaslavich	before 1054; Son of Iziaslav I and Gertrude of Poland	1054-1067	1069 aged at least 14-15	Unknown one child	
Gleb I Gleb Sviatoslavich	1052; Son of Sviatoslav II of Kiev and Cecilia	1067-1078	30 May 1078; Novgorod aged 25–26	Unmarried	
Sviatopolk I Sviatopolk Iziaslavich	8 November 1050; Son of Iziaslav I and Gertrude of Poland	1078-1088	26 April 1113; Vyshhorod aged 62	(Barbara?) of Bohemia c.1085 three children Olenna of the Kipchaks c.1094 four children	Also Grand Prince of Kiev

=== Contested control (1088–1230) ===
From 1088 to 1230, control over Novgorod was contested between various princely houses, and between them and the city itself. In 1136, the citizenry of Novgorod established the Novgorod Republic, and henceforth – in theory, though not always in practice – elected and dismissed its city officials, including the prince.

Prince	Born	Reign	Death	Consort	Notes
Mstislav II the Great; Mstislav Vladimirovich	1 June 1076; Turov; Son of Vladimir II Monomakh and Gytha of Wessex	1088-1094 1095-1117	14 April 1132; Kiev aged 55	Christina of Sweden; 1095 ten children Liubava Dmitrievna of Novgorod; 1122 two children	After his reign Kievan Rus' fell into recession starting a rapid decline.
David I David Sviatoslavich	1050; Son of Sviatoslav II of Kiev and Cecilia	1094-1095	1123; Chernigov aged 72–73	Teodosia five children	Son of Sviatoslav II of Kiev.
Vsevolod Mstislavich	1103	1117-1132	11 February 1138	Anna before 1125 four children	Son of Mstislav the Great. 1st time.
Sviatopolk Mstislavich	After 1096	1132	20 February 1154	Euphemia of Olomouc; 1143 or 1144 no children	Also Prince of Polotsk and Pskov. Son of Mstislav the Great. 1st time.
Vsevolod Mstislavich	1103	1132-1136	11 February 1138	Anna before 1125 four children	2nd time.
Sviatoslav Olgovich	1106/1107	1136-1138	1164	Unknown six children	Son of Oleg I of Chernigov. 1st time.
Sviatopolk Mstislavich	After 1096	1138	20 February 1154	Euphemia of Olomouc; 1143 or 1144 no children	2nd time.
Rostislav Yurevich	?	1138-1140	6 April 1151	Unknown before 1151 three children	Son of Yuri Dolgoruki. 1st time.
Sviatoslav Olgovich	1106/1107	1140-1141	1164	Unknown six children	2nd time.
Sviatoslav Vsevolodovich	1123	1141	25 July 1194	Maria of Polotsk; 1143 eight children	Son of Vsevolod II of Kiev.
Rostislav Yurevich	?	1141-1142	6 April 1151	Unknown before 1151 three children	2nd time.
Sviatopolk Mstislavich	After 1096	1142-1148	20 February 1154	Euphemia of Olomouc; 1143 or 1144 no children	3rd time.
Yaroslav Iziaslavich	1132	1148-1154	1180	Unknown; 1149 four children	Son of Iziaslav II of Kiev.
Rostislav Mstislavich	1110	1154	14 March 1167	Unknown eight children	Son of Mstislav the Great.
David Rostislavich	1140	1154-1155	23 April 1197	Unknown before 1197 seven children	Son of the predecessor.
Mstislav Yurevich	?	1155-1158	after 1161	Unknown	Son of Yuri Dolgoruki.
Sviatoslav Rostislavich	?	1158-1160	1170	Unknown	Son of Rostislav Mstislavich. 1st time.
Mstislav Rostislavich the Eyeless	before 1151	1160-1161	20 April 1178	Unknown two children Unknown no children	Son of Rostislav Yurevich. 1st time
Sviatoslav Rostislavich	?	1161-1168	1170	Unknown	2nd time.
Roman Mstislavich the Great	1152	1168-1170	19 June 1205	Predslava of Kiev; 1170 or 1180 two children Anna Angelina of Byzantium c.1197 two children	Son of Mstislav II of Kiev. Also King of Galicia-Volhynia.
Rurik Rostislavich	before 1157	1170-1171	1215	Unknown; 1163 Anna of Turov before 1176 six children	Son of Rostislav Mstislavich.
Yuri Andreevich I Bogolyubsky	c.1160	1171-1175	c.1194	Tamar I of Georgia; 1185 (annulled 1187) no children	Son of Prince Andrey Bogolyubsky.
Sviatoslav Mstislavich	?	1175	after 1176	Unknown	SOn of Mstislav Rostislavich.
Mstislav Rostislavich the Eyeless	before 1151	1175-1176	20 April 1178	Unknown two children Unknown no children	2nd time.
Yaroslav Mstislavich the Red	?	1176-1177	1199	Unmarried	Son of Mstislav Yurevich.
Mstislav Rostislavich the Eyeless	before 1151	1177-1178	20 April 1178	Unknown two children Unknown no children	3rd time.
Yaropolk Rostislavich	?	1178	1182 or after 1196	Unknown	Son of Rostislav Mstislavich.
Roman Rostislavich	before 1149	1178-1179	14 June 1180	Maria of Novgorod; 9 January 1149 three children	Son of Rostislav Mstislavich.
Mstislav Rostislavich the Brave	1143	1179-1180	13 July 1180	Two unknown wives three children	Son of Rostislav Mstislavich.
Vladimir Sviatoslavich	after 1143	1180-1181	1200	Maria of Vladimir-Suzdal; 1178 five children	Son of Sviatoslav Vsevolodovich.
Yaroslav Vladimirovich	?	1182-1184	after 1176	Unknown Alanian wife three children	Son of Vladimir III of Kiev. 1st time.
Mstislav Davidovich	?	1184-1187	1189	Unknown	Son of David Rostislavich.
Yaroslav Vladimirovich	?	1187-1196	after 1176	Unknown Alanian wife three children	2nd time.
Yaropolk Yaroslavich	after 1174	1197	between 1212 and 1223	Vasilissa (of Chernigov?) no children	Son of Yaroslav II of Chernigov.
Yaroslav Vladimirovich	?	1197-1199	after 1176	Unknown Alanian wife three children	3rd time.
Sviatoslav Vsevolodovich	27 March 1196	1200-1205	3 February 1252	Eudokia of Murom one child	Son of Grand Duke Vsevolod the Big Nest. Also Grand Duke of Vladimir. 1st time.
Konstantin Vsevolodovich	18 May 1185	1205-1207	2 February 1218	Agafia of Kiev three children	Son of Grand Duke Vsevolod the Big Nest. Also Grand Duke of Vladimir.
Sviatoslav Vsevolodovich	27 March 1196	1207-1210	3 February 1252	Eudokia of Murom one child	2nd time.
Mstislav Mstislavich the Bold	1176	1210-1215	1228	Maria of Cumania nine children	Son of Mstislav Rostislavich. 1st time.
Yaroslav Vsevolodovich	8 February 1191	1215-1216	30 September 1246	Unknown; 1205 no children Rostislava of Novgorod; 1214 (annulled 1216) no children Theodosia of Ryazan; 1218 twelve children	Son of Grand Duke Vsevolod the Big Nest. Also Grand Duke of Vladimir. 1st time.
Mstislav Mstislavich the Bold	1176	1216-1217	1228	Maria of Cumania nine children	2nd time.
Sviatoslav Mstislavich	?	1217-1218	1239	Unknown	Son of Mstislav III of Kiev.
Vsevolod Mstislavich	?	1218-1221	1239	Unknown	Son of Mstislav III of Kiev.
Vsevolod Yurevich	1212 or 1213	1221	7 February 1238	Marina of Kiev; 1230 no children	Son of Yuri II of Vladimir. 1st time.
Yaroslav Vsevolodovich	8 February 1191	1221-1223	30 September 1246	Unknown; 1205 no children Rostislava of Novgorod; 1214 (annulled 1216) no children Theodosia of Ryazan; 1218 twelve children	2nd time.
Vsevolod Yurevich	1212 or 1213	1223-1224	7 February 1238	Marina of Kiev; 1230 no children	2nd time.
Saint Michael Vsevolodovich	1185	1224-1226	20 September 1246	Helena of Galicia-Volhynia; 1210 or 1211 seven children	Son of Vsevolod IV of Kiev. 1st time.
Yaroslav Vsevolodovich	8 February 1191	1226-1228	30 September 1246	Unknown; 1205 no children Rostislava of Novgorod; 1214 (annulled 1216) no children Theodosia of Ryazan; 1218 twelve children	3rd time.
Saint Alexander Yaroslavich Nevsky	13 May 1221	1228-1229	14 November 1263	Praskovia-Alexandra of Polotsk; 1239 five children Vassilissa before 1263 no children	Son of the predecessor. 1st time.
Saint Michael Vsevolodovich	1185	1229	20 September 1246	Helena of Galicia-Volhynia; 1210 or 1211 seven children	2nd time.
Rostislav Mikhailovich	after 1210	1229-1230	1262	Anna of Hungary; 1243 five children	Son of the predecessor.

=== Dominance of Grand Prince of Vladimir (1230–1478) ===
From 1230 to 1478, the Grand Prince of Vladimir was either himself the Prince of Novgorod, or the patron of the Prince of Novgorod. There was fierce competition between the princes of Tver, Moscow, and Nizhny Novgorod-Suzdal for the title of Grand Prince of Vladimir, after 1400 increasingly granted by yarlik (patent) of the khan of the Golden Horde by winning his favour, which eventually the Daniilovichi of Moscow did.

Prince	Born	Reign	Death	Consort	Notes
Yaroslav Vsevolodovich	8 February 1191	1230-1236	30 September 1246	Unknown; 1205 no children Rostislava of Novgorod; 1214 (annulled 1216) no children Theodosia of Ryazan; 1218 twelve children	4th time.
Saint Alexander Yaroslavich Nevsky	13 May 1221	1236-1240	14 November 1263	Praskovia-Alexandra of Polotsk; 1239 five children Vassilissa before 1263 no children	2nd time.
Andrey Yaroslavich	1220	1240-1241	1264	Justina of Galicia three children	Son of Yaroslav Vsevolodovich.
Saint Alexander Yaroslavich Nevsky	13 May 1221	1241-1252	14 November 1263	Praskovia-Alexandra of Polotsk; 1239 five children Vassilissa before 1263 no children	3rd time.
Vasily Alexandrovich	?	1252-1255	1271	Unmarried	Son of Alexander Yaroslavich.
Yaroslav Yaroslavich	1230	1255	16 September 1272	Natalia before 1252 two children Saint Xenia of Tarusa; 1265 four children	Son of Yaroslav Vsevolodovich. 1st time.
Vasily Alexandrovich	?	1255-1257	1271	Unmarried	2nd time.
Saint Alexander Yaroslavich Nevsky	13 May 1221	1257-1259	14 November 1263	Praskovia-Alexandra of Polotsk; 1239 five children Vassilissa before 1263 no children	4th time.
Dmitry Alexandrovich	1250	1259-1263	1294	Unknown four children	Son of Alexander Yaroslavich. 1st time.
Yaroslav Yaroslavich	1230	1264-1272	16 September 1272	Natalia before 1252 two children Saint Xenia of Tarusa; 1265 four children	2nd time.
Dmitry Alexandrovich	1250	1272-1273	1294	Unknown four children	2nd time.
Vasily Yaroslavich	1236 or 1241	1273-1276	1276	Unknown	3rd time.
Dmitry Alexandrovich	1250	1276-1281	1294	Unknown four children	3rd time.
Andrey Alexandrovich	1255	1281-1285	27 July 1304	Vasilissa of Rostov; 1294 three children	Son of Alexander Yaroslavich. 1st time.
Dmitry Alexandrovich	1250	1285-1292	1294	Unknown four children	4th time.
Andrey Alexandrovich	1255	1292-1304	27 July 1304	Vasilissa of Rostov; 1294 three children	2nd time.
Saint Michael Yaroslavich	1255	1304-1314	22 November 1318	Saint Anna of Rostov; 1294 five children	Son of Yaroslav Yaroslavich. 1st time.
Afanasi Danilovich	?	1314-1315	1322	Anna no children	Son of Daniel of Moscow. 1st time.
Saint Michael Yaroslavich	1255	1315-1316	22 November 1318	Saint Anna of Rostov; 1294 five children	2nd time.
Afanasi Danilovich	?	1316-1322	1322	Anna no children	2nd time.
Yuri Danilovich	1281	1322-1325	21 November 1325	Unknown; 1297 one child Konchaka of Mengu-Timur (baptised Agafia); 1317 no children	Son of Daniel of Moscow.
Alexander Mikhailovich	7 October 1301	1325-1327	29 October 1339	Anastasia of Galicia; 1320 eight children	Son of Michael Yaroslavich.

==== Daniilovichi Princes of Moscow ====
- 1328–1337 Ivan I Kalita the Money-bag
- 1337–1353 Simeon the Proud
- 1353–1359 Ivan II the Fair
- 1359–1363 Dmitry II the One-eyed, 1359–1363
- 1363–1389 Dmitry III of the Don

==== Gediminid Grand Dukes of Lithuania ====
- 1389–1407 Lengvenis

==== Daniilovichi Princes of Moscow ====
- 1408–1425 Vasily I, 1408–1425
- 1425–1462 Vasily II the Blind, 1425–1462
- 1462–1480 Ivan III the Great

== See also ==
- Of Novgorod

== Bibliography ==
- Halperin, Charles J. (1987). Russia and the Golden Horde: The Mongol Impact on Medieval Russian History. p. 222. ISBN 9781850430575. (e-book).
- Martin, Janet (2007). Medieval Russia: 980–1584. Second Edition. E-book. Cambridge: Cambridge University Press. ISBN 978-0-511-36800-4.
- Paul, Michael C. (2008). "Was The Prince of Novgorod a "Third-Rate Bureaucrat"after 1136?". Jahrbücher für Geschichte Osteuropas. 56 (1). Franz Steiner Verlag: 72–113. JSTOR 41052013.
