= Circassians (historical ethnonym) =

Name for certain ethnicities in Turkey

Circassians is a broad ethnonym of the Turkic origin, which in Russia, Turkey and Persia used to be, and in the case of Turkey is now, applied to peoples of different ethnicities living on the North Eastern and Eastern shores of the Black Sea, and in the Northern Caucasus.

== Origin ==
Volkova, a prominent Soviet professor of Caucasian studies, wrote:

The origin of the term Circassian, with its ethnical nature coming only from the Turkic roots, was related to some political events of the 13th century.

In the Russian letopis of the 16th century, when describing events of 1152, name "Circassians" is mentioned as another name for Turkic vassals of Kievan princes — "Black Klobukhs" — consisting of Turkic tribes of Torks, Pechenegs, Berendei and Kovuy (often identified as Kayi). Circassians are mentioned as one of the peoples of the Golden Horde in 1346, and participants of the Kulikovo battle of 1380.

"Circassian" was a synonym of the Turkic word "Kazak", and Turkic Circassians became (coming from its usage for Black Klobucks) the basis for the Cossack ethnic group and military class.

== Further use ==
Some of the "Asian" Circassians, who defied Mongol or Lithuanian rule, settled around Dnieper river, mixed with Eastern European runaways in the XIV-XV centuries, accepted Christianity and eventually switched to a Slavic language. In result, in the 15-18th centuries the term was applied by the Russians to Slavic-speaking Cossack population of the Black Sea shores and Dnieper region. Cossacks described themselves using the term Circassians.

In some Russian, Persian and Turkish sources the term "Circassians" was also used to describe then Slavic-speaking population of the Black Sea shore, the Caspian shore and some of the peoples of the North Caucasus:

- Turkic Karachay people.
- Turkic Kumyk people
- Turkic Nogai people

Around the 16-17th centuries the term becomes an exoethnonym for the Adygha peoples. Nevertheless, it yet continued to be used as one of the names of the Turkic speaking population in the mentioned region. In 1634 a Dominican order monk Giovani Lucca wrote:

Circassians look very much like Nogai Tatars... They speak Circassian and Turkish...

Adam Olearius in 1653 calls Turkic people of the Caspian shores "the Circassian Tatars". Engelbert Kempfer wrote about wider usage of the term in 1674:

Circassians are called Turks... Alans or population of the Caucasus, as well as Svans and Kara-Circassians (Karachays) also go by the name of Circassians.

== Modern use ==
Since 20th century the term is mostly narrowed down to only Adygha peoples. However, in Turkey the term is widely applied to all of the North Caucasian peoples.

Today there is still a Kazakh zhuz called Sherkesh (Ch is phonetically replaced by Sh in Kazakh), closely related to Nogais.

=== Criticism ===
Many authors pointed out that it was wrong to apply the name Circassian to Adygha (or to other North Caucasians). Russian Lieutenant General Blaramberg wrote in 1834:

Circassians, whom Europeans call incorrectly, call themselves Adygha or Adehe.

Teofil Lapinski, an anti-imperialist, who fought against the Russian Empire in the ranks of Adygha, wrote in 1863:

I always distinguish between Circassians, which are looked upon in Abkhazia as on unwanted guests, and Abaza and Adygha, who own the region and form the majority of the population... I want to oppose a mistaken view which is widely popular in Europe. It's absolutely wrong, when peoples of Caucasus, as well as of Dagestan, are called Circassians. Circassians do not exist any more; those remaining in the Caucasus do not call themselves by that name and disappear further day after day. Starting last year what's remaining of them have been moving to Turkey in significant numbers. Much more right of being called Circassians belongs to the Cossacks of Russia...

Lapinski also points out the mixture of Turkic and Adygha in Circassia:

This Circassians... marry only among themselves; therefore Tatar race was preserved almost unmixed among them.

Modern researcher Bubenok talks about denominating some Adygha as Circassians in the Soviet era, when they were coming up with a name for Karachay-Cherkessia:

..Therefore Soviet government didn't care to think too much and decided to use a traditional term Circassian for Adyghs (even though Adyghs have never called themselves by that name).

James Bell wrote in 1830s:

The appellation and language of the Circassians is “Adighe“; Tcherkess, a word of Turkish or Tatar derivation, is never used by the natives, and even not understood by many of them.
