= Budnick =

Budnick is a surname. It originated as an Americanized form of the surname Budnik. Notable people with the surname include:

- Dean Budnick, American writer, music critic and journalist
- Mike Budnick (1919–1999), American baseball player
- Scott Budnick (soccer) (born 1971), retired American soccer player
- Scott Budnick (film producer), American film producer
- Sidney Jonas Budnick (1921–1994), American artist

== See also ==
- Hammond Block (Budnick's Trading Mart), historical commercial building in Indianapolis, Indiana
