= Mstislav Rostislavich =

Mstislav Rostislavich may refer to:

- Mstislav Rostislavich of Smolensk (died 1180), nicknamed "the Brave", Prince of Smolensk (1175–1177) and Prince of Novgorod (1179–1180)
- Mstislav the Eyeless, Mstislav Rostislavich Bezokii (died 1178), Prince of Rostov (1175–1176) and Prince of Novgorod (1160–1161, 1177–1178)
