= Rostislav Yuryevich =

Rostislav Yuryevich (Russian: Ростислав Юрьевич) (died April 6, 1151) was the Prince of Novgorod and Pereyaslavl, oldest son of Yuri Dolgoruky, and brother of Andrei Bogolyubsky.

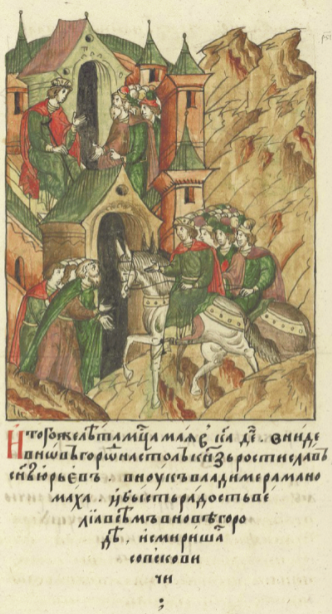
Rostislav's accession to Novgorod, miniature from the Illustrated Chronicle of Ivan the Terrible (16th century)

== Biography ==
Rostislav Yuryevich's name was first mentioned in a chronicle under the year of 1138, when he was invited by the citizens of Novgorod as a ruler for the purpose of preserving friendly relations with Yuri Dolgoruky, Prince of Suzdal. Rostislav Yuryevich reigned over the Novgorodians for over a year and then left the city in 1139 after they had refused to lend a helping hand to Yuri Dolgoruky in his struggle against Vsevolod Olgovich, Prince of Kiev. In 1141, the Novgorodians invited Yuri Dolgoruky to rule over them, but the latter refused to come to the city personally and sent Rostislav Yuryevich, instead. This time, Rostislav reigned over the Novgorodians less than a year because the city dwellers sent him back to his father upon receiving the news that Vsevolod Olgovich had dispatched Svyatopolk Mstislavich to rule over Novgorod.

In 1147, Yuri Dolgoruky sent Rostislav and his brother Andrei to aide his ally Svyatoslav Olgovich of Chernigov in his struggle against Izyaslav Mstislavich, Grand Prince of Kiev. Rostislav and Andrei defeated the army of Rostislav Yaroslavich of Ryazan (Izyaslav's ally) and made him flee to Polotsk. In 1148, Yuri Dolgoruky sent his son Rostislav to southern parts of Rus to aide Svyatoslav Olgovich yet again and to get himself an appanage, because he could not provide him with one in the Suzdal region. Upon witnessing Svyatoslav's difficult situation, Rostislav chose to turn to the grand prince of Kiev with a request for an appanage, saying that his father has offended him. Izyaslav Mstislavich granted him six towns in the Volhynia, namely Buzhsk, Mezhibozh, Kotelnitsa, Gorodets Ostersky and two other unknown towns.

In 1148, Gorodets Ostersky hosted a princely congress, at the conclusion of which it was decided to attack Yuri Dolgoruky during the winter of 1149 and punish him for his oppression of the Novgorodians. Rostislav Yuryevich took part in this congress, but he didn't participate in the military campaign against his own father. Upon Izyaslav Mstislavich's return, the Kievan boyars informed him that during his absence Rostislav had been conspiring against him together with the citizens of Kiev and the Berendeis. Izyaslav believed the report despite Rostislav's denial and deported him and his druzhina back to Yuri Dolgoruky. Upon his arrival, Rostislav told his father that the whole Kievan region and Chernye Klobuki had been unhappy with Izyaslav Mstislavich and wanted to see Yuri Dolgoruky as their ruler. The latter was very angry with Rostislav's expulsion from Gorodets-Ostersky and organized a military campaign against the grand prince, defeating him at Pereyaslavl and ousting him from Kiev. Yuri Dolgoruky installed Rostislav in Pereyaslavl, where the latter would rule until his death.

In 1150, Rostislav took part in his father's new military campaign against Izyaslav Mstislavich and opposed signing a peace treaty with the latter. Despite this, the peace treaty was signed at the insistence of Andrei Bogolyubsky. Izyaslav renounced his right for the Kievan throne in favor of his brother Vyacheslav Mstislavich. Soon, however, Izyaslav violated the peace treaty and captured Kiev. His son Mstislav wanted to take Pereyaslavl away from Rostislav Yuryevich. With the help of his brother Andrei and the Torks, Rostislav defeated Mstislav's allies, and the latter dismissed the idea of attacking Pereyaslavl.

Rostislav Yuryevich died in 1151 and was interred by his brothers Andrei, Gleb, and Mstislav at Saint Michael's Church in Pereyaslavl next to his uncles Andrei Vladimirovich and Svyatoslav Vladimirovich.
