= Mikhail I =

Mikhail I may refer to:

- Mikhail of Vladimir (died in 1176)
- Michael of Russia (Mikhail I Fyodorovich Romanov) (1596–1645)
