= Vladimir III =

Vladimir III may refer to:

- Vladimir III Mstislavich (1132–1173), prince of Kiev in 1171
- Vladimir III Svyatoslavich (after 1143 – 1200), prince of Novgorod
- Vladimir III Igorevich (1170–1211), prince of Galicia
