= Karakalpak =

Karakalpak may refer to:

- Karakalpaks, a Turkic people
- Karakalpak language, the language of the Karakalpaks
- Karakalpakstan, an autonomous republic within Uzbekistan
- Chorni Klobuky (Turkic Karakalpak), a group of semi-nomadic Turkic or Turkic-speaking tribes

== See also ==
- Karapapak, a different Turkic people
