= Vladimir III Svyatoslavich =

Olgovichi prince

Vladimir III Svyatoslavich (after 1143 – autumn of 1200) was an Olgovichi prince. His baptismal name was Boris. He was prince of Gomiy (1164–?), of Novgorod (1180–1181, 1181–1182), of Karachev (1194–?), and probably of Novgorod-Seversk (1198–1200).

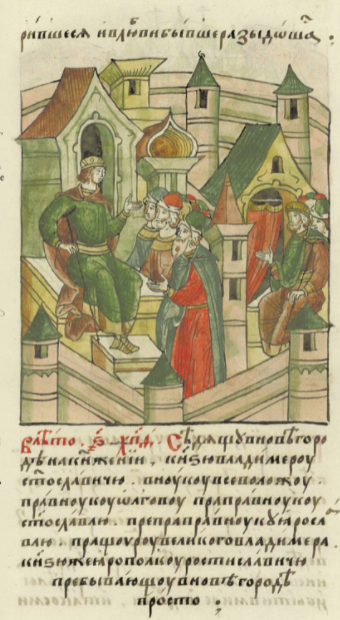
Miniature from the Illustrated Chronicle of Ivan the Terrible

== Marriage ==
#1179: Evdokia Mikhaylovna, the daughter of prince Mikhalko Yurevich of Vladimir

They evidently had no sons.

== Ancestors ==
Ancestors of Vladimir III Svyatoslavich

16. Sviatoslav II Yaroslavich, grand prince of Kiev
8. Oleg Svyatoslavich, prince of Chernigov
4. Vsevolod II Olgovich, grand prince of Kiev
9. Theophano Musalonissa
2. Sviatoslav III Vsevolodovich, grand prince of Kiev
20. Vladimir II Vsevolodovich, grand prince of Kiev
10. Mstislav Vladimirovich, grand prince of Kiev
21. Gytha of England
5. Maria Mstislavna of Kiev
22. Inge Stenkilsson, king of Sweden
11. Christine of Sweden
23. Helena
1. Vladimir III Svyatoslavich
24. Vseslav Bryacheslavich, prince of Polotsk
12. Sviatoslav Vseslavich, prince of Polotsk
6. Vasilko Svyatoslavich of Polotsk
3. Maria Vasilkovna of Polotsk

== Sources ==
- Dimnik, Martin: The Dynasty of Chernigov - 1146-1246; Cambridge University Press, 2003, Cambridge; ISBN 978-0-521-03981-9.

Preceded by	Prince of Gomiy; 1164–?	Succeeded by
Preceded by Mstislav Rostislavich	Prince of Novgorod; 1180–1181	Succeeded by Svyatoslav Vsevolodovich
Preceded by Svyatoslav Vsevolodovich	Prince of Novgorod; 1181–1182	Succeeded by
Preceded by	Prince of Karachev; 1194–?	Succeeded by
Preceded by Igor Svyatoslavich	Prince of Novgorod-Seversk; 1198–1200	Succeeded by
