= El Torky =

El Torky or El Torkey (Arabic: التركي) or Torky (Arabic: تركي) is a surname. Notable people with the surname include:

- Heba El Torky (born 1991), Egyptian squash player
- Nouran El Torky (born 1992), Egyptian squash player
- Mohsen Torky (born 1973), Iranian football referee
- Omar El Torkey (born 2001), Egyptian squash player
