= Tork people =

Medieval Turkic tribe

Torks (Cyrillic: торки, literally "Turks", also known as Torkils) were a medieval Turkic tribe of Oghuz and/or Kipchak origins. The Torks, alongsides Kipchaks (e.g. Berendei), and other tribes like Ulichi, Pechenegs, etc., formed the Chornye Klobuki ("Black Hats", Turkic Karakalpak), semi-nomadic tribes who fought as border guards for various princes of Kievan Rus.

In 1177 a Cuman army, allied with Ryazan, sacked six cities belonging to the Berendei and Torks.

In Ukraine, many placenames trace to Torks, such as Torchesk, Torchyn, rivers Torets and Torch, Torsky way along the river Tetilha, villages Torets, Torky, Toretske and also a town near the Ukrainian border of Poland called Torki.
