= Yaropolk Rostislavich =

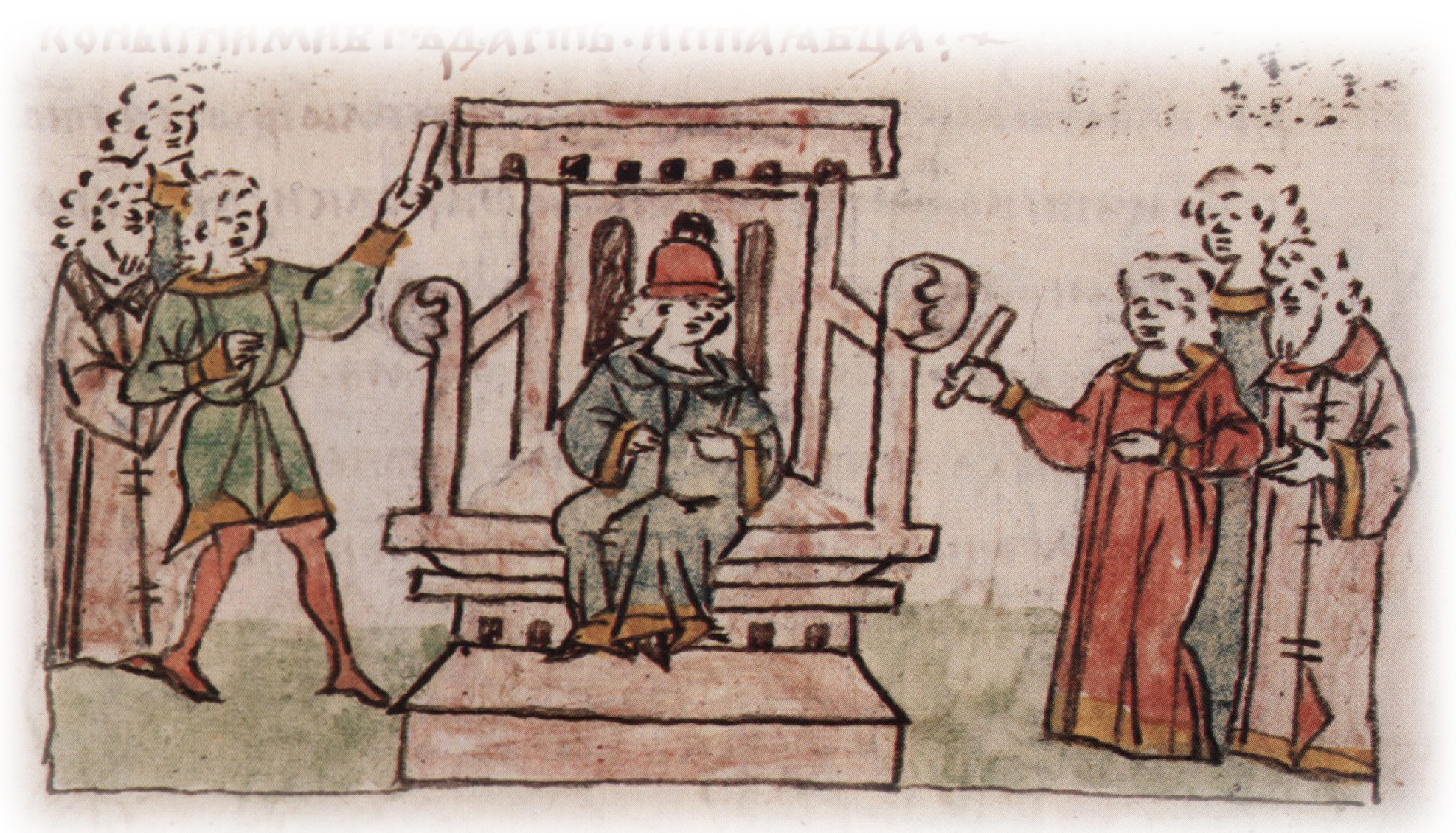
Yaropolk III on the throne, miniature from the Radziwiłł Chronicle (15th century)

Yaropolk III Rostislavich (11XX - 1182?) was a grand prince of Vladimir between 1174 and 1175. He was a nephew of Andrey Bogolyubsky. In 1173, Andrey seized Kiev (Kyiv) from Roman I of Kiev and gave it to his brother Mikhalko Yuriyevich, who in turn gave it to his brother Vsevolod the Big Nest and Yaropolk Rostislavich. However on March 24, 1173, Roman's brothers retaliated against Vsevolod and Yaropolk, taking them captive and giving Kiev to Rurik Rostislavich.
