= Mikhail of Vladimir =

Grand Prince of Vladimir (r. 1174; 1175–1176)

Mikhalko (Mikhail) Yuryevich (Russian: Михалко (Михаил) Юрьевич; died 20 June 1176) was Grand Prince of Vladimir in 1174, and from 1175 to 1176. He was a son of Yuri Dolgoruky.

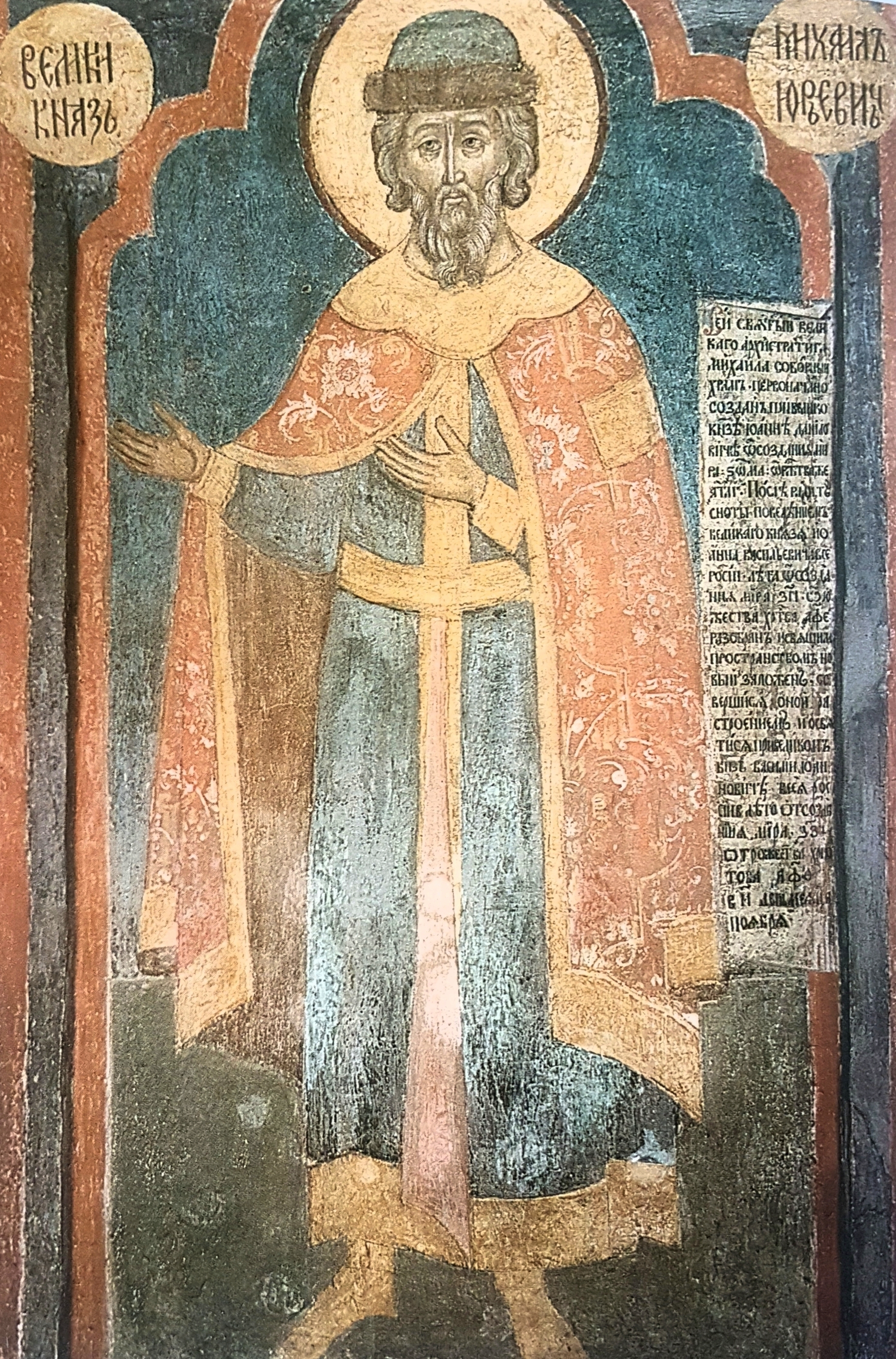
Prince Mikhail, fresco from the Cathedral of the Archangel (17th century)

== Life ==
Yuri Dolgoruky's eldest son by his second marriage, Mikhalko Yuryevich was removed from the Suzdal lands by his half-brother Andrei Bogolyubsky, who disliked his mother.

From 1162 to 1169 he lived in Ostyor, a small town near Chernigov, but he then moved on to the town of Torchesk. Appointed by Andrei to rule Kiev upon the death of Gleb Yuriyevich in 1171, Mikhalko refused to take the throne and sent his younger brother Vsevolod to Kiev instead. He was besieged in Torchesk by another claimant to Kiev, Yaropolk Rostislavich, but concluded peace with him and was allowed to move his capital to Pereiaslav. The starving of his subjects prompted Mikhail's surrender after a week of holding the city. The next year, when Andrei invaded southern Rus', he broke his ties with Rurik and swore allegiance to his brother.

Upon Andrei's death, Yuryevich succeeded him in Vladimir, but he was forced to leave for Chernigov due to hostilities with boyars of Suzdal and Rostov, who felt neglected by the rise of Vladimir. The citizens of Vladimir soon called upon Yuryevich to help them fight against Yaropolk, son of Rostislav Yuryevich. He defeated this nephew of Andrei Bogolubsky and regained the throne of Vladimir in 1175. Mikhalko died the next year and was succeeded by his brother Vsevolod.

Regnal titles
Preceded by Andrei Bogolyubski	Grand Prince of Vladimir; 1175–1176	Succeeded by Vsevolod the Big Nest
Preceded by Vladimir III Mstislavich	Grand Prince of Kiev; 1171	Succeeded by Roman I
