= Aepa =

Aepa (Russian: Аепа, romanized: Aepa; Ukrainian: Аєпа, romanized: Ayepa) is the name of at least two early 12th-century Cuman (Polovtsi) princes mentioned in Rus' chronicles.

The Primary Chronicle (PVL) mentions two men named "Aepa" under the year 6615 (1107–1108; columns 282.25–283.3): (Note: Laurentian Codex: томьж лѣт мцса тогож иде володимеръ и двд҃ъ и ѡлегъ къ аепѣ и другому аепѣ· и створиша миръ· и поꙗ володимеръ за юргѧ· аепину дщерь· ѡсеневу внуку· а ѡлегъ поꙗ за сн҃а· аепину дчерь· гиргеневу внуку· мцса· генвр ·в҃і· дн҃ь·:·, 'That same year, in [the] same month, Volodimer' and D[a]v[i]d' and Ōleg' went to Ayepě and [the] other Ayepě. And [they] made peace. And Volodimer' took [as a wife] for Yurgę Aepa's (Aepinu's) daughter, Osen(ev)'s granddaughter, and Ōleg' took [as a wife] for [his] son Aepa's (Aepinu's) daughter, Girgen(ev)'s granddaughter, on [the] 12th day of [the] month of January.') (Note: Hypatian Codex: томъже лѣтѣ тогоже мцса иде володимеръ и двд҃ъ и ѡлегъ к аꙗпѣ· и другому аепѣ· и створиша миръ· и поꙗ володимеръ за гергиꙗ епиѡпину дщерь· ѧсѣну внука· а ѡлегъ поꙗ [ ] акаепиду дщерь ꙗневу внуку· мцса генварѧ· во вторы на ·і҃· дн҃ь·, 'That same year, in [the] same month, Volodimer' and D[a]v[i]d' and Ōleg' went to Ajapě and [the] other Aepě. And [they] made peace. And Volodimer' took [as a wife] for Gergija Epiōpa's (Epiōpinu's) daughter, Ęsěn(u)'s granddaughter, and Ōleg' took [as a wife] [space left blank] Akaepa's (Akaepidu's) daughter, Janev's (Janevu's) granddaughter, on [the] twelfth day of [the] month of January.')

During the same month of this year [January 1108], Vladimir [Monomakh], David [Sviatoslavich], and Oleg [Sviatoslavich I of Chernigov] went forth to meet Aepa and his namesake (Note: Laurentian Codex: къ Аєпѣ и другому Аєпѣ. "to Ayepě and [the] other Ayepě." Hypatian Codex: к Аӕпѣ и другому Аепѣ. "to Aæpě and [the] other Aepě.") and made peace. On January 12, Vladimir took the daughter of Aepa son of Osen', to be the wife of Prince George, while Oleg took for his son the daughter of Aepa son of Girgen.

"Prince George" is understood to be Yuri Dolgorukiy, who thus married a daughter of Aepa son of Osen' (literally "daughter of Aepa, granddaughter of Osen'"). With her, he begot his son Andrey Bogolyubsky. The son of Oleg Sviatoslavich is understood to be Sviatoslav Olgovich, who thus married a daughter of Aepa son of Girgen (literally "daughter of Aepa, granddaughter of Girgen").

In the so-called Testament of Vladimir Monomakh, which is attached to the PVL only in the Laurentian Codex, the name "Aepa" occurs twice more, although it appears the author thought there was only one Aepa and not two:

- "After Christmas, we were able to make peace with Aepa, and after receiving his daughter in marriage, we proceeded to Smolensk."
- "Aepa and Bonyak had approached Vÿr' with the intention of capturing it. I advanced to meet them as far as Romnÿ with Oleg and my sons. When the nomads learned of our coming, they fled."

The latter event is partially corroborated by the continuation of the PVL in the Hypatian Codex sub anno 6621 (April 1113), although it doesn't mention any "Aepa": 'When the Polovtsi heard of Sviatopolk's death, they gathered and marched on Vyr (a fortress on the river Seym in the principality of Pereyaslavl'). But Vladimir gathered his sons and cousins, marched on Vyr, joined his forces with Oleg's, after which the Polovtsi fled.'

One last mention of an unspecified "Aepa" occurs in the Hypatian PVL continuation sub anno 6625 (1117): 'Then the Polovtsi went to the land of the Bulgars, and the Bulgar prince sent them poisoned beverage. After Aepa and the other princes drank from it, they all died.'

Aepa may be a slavicization of the Arab name Ayyub (Persian: ايوب خان, Tatar: Äyyüb [æɪˈjyp]). A recent and more accepted theory reconstructs it to Ayoba or Ayapa (moon-father).

== Bibliography ==
=== Primary sources ===
- Primary Chronicle (PVL; c. 1110s; Lauretian copy 1377, Hypatian copy c. 1425).
  - Ostrowski, Donald; Birnbaum, David J. (7 December 2014). "Rus' primary chronicle critical edition – Interlinear line-level collation". pvl.obdurodon.org (in Church Slavic). Archived from the original on 28 April 2025.
  - Cross, Samuel Hazzard; Sherbowitz-Wetzor, Olgerd P. (1953) [1930]. The Russian Primary Chronicle, Laurentian Text. Translated and edited by Samuel Hazzard Cross and Olgerd P. Sherbowitz-Wetzor (PDF). Cambridge, Massachusetts: The Mediaeval Academy of America. p. 325. (includes the Testament of Vladimir Monomakh).
  - Thuis, Hans (2015). Nestorkroniek. De oudste geschiedenis van het Kievse Rijk (in Dutch). Nijmegen: Uitgeverij Vantilt. p. 304. ISBN 9789460042287. (includes the Hypatian continuation of the PVL).

=== Literature ===
- Raffensperger, Christian; Ostrowski, Donald (2023). The Ruling Families of Rus: Clan, Family and Kingdom. London: Reaktion Books. p. 309. ISBN 978-1-78914-745-2. (e-book)
