= Sidney Jonas Budnick =

American abstract artist (1921–1994)

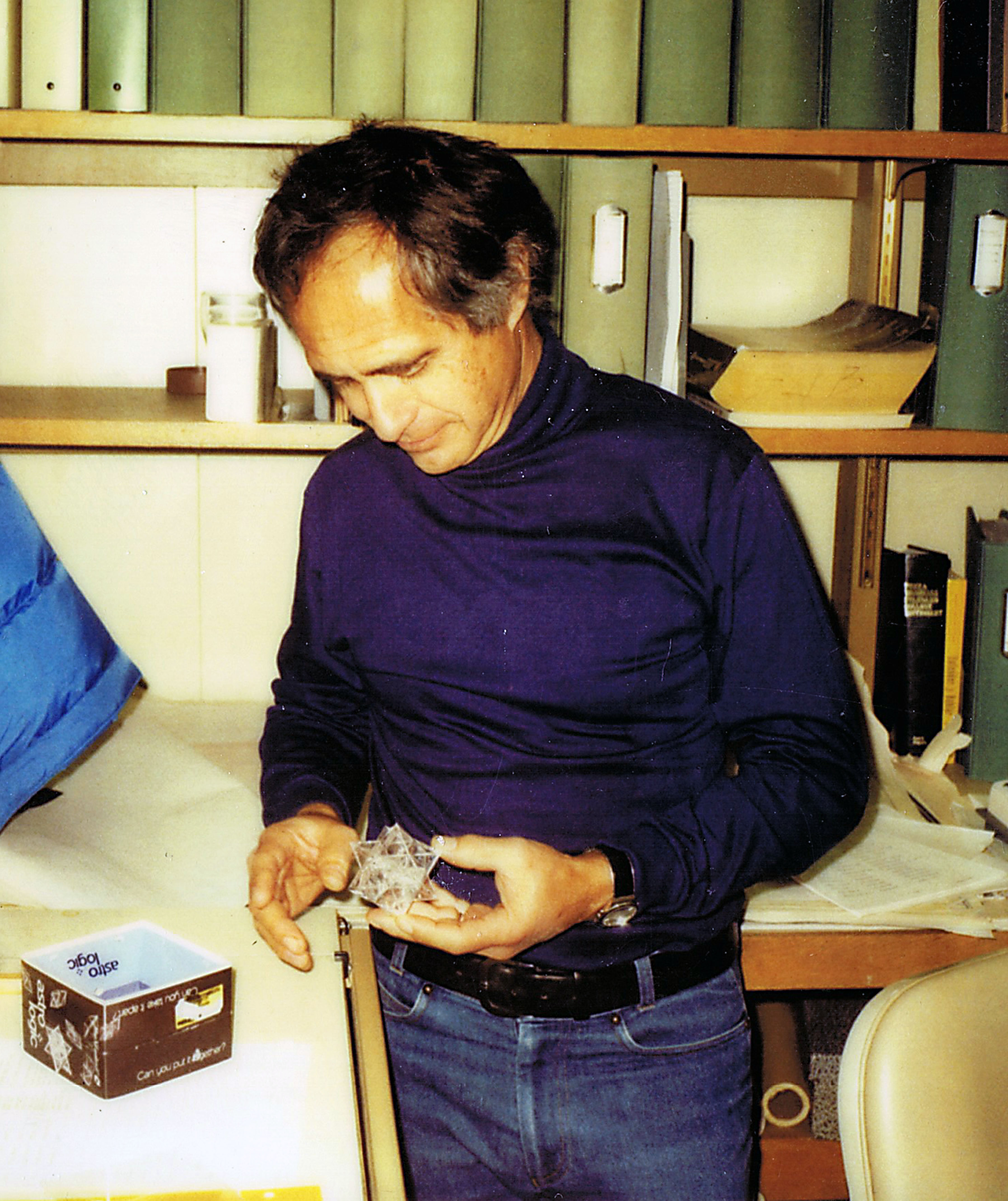
Sidney Jonas Budnick

Sidney Jonas Budnick (June 18, 1921 – August 25, 1994) was an American abstract artist. He was born and raised in New York City.

== Biography ==
While living in New York, Sidney Budnick met the Dutch artist Piet Mondrian. Budnick was greatly influenced by Mondrian's work and the De Stijl art movement. Budnick studied under Hans Hofmann, an abstract expressionist artist and teacher, and was friends with Harry Holtzman and Carl Holty, founders of the American Abstract Artists group.

Sidney Budnick was also encouraged by Hilla Rebay, the artistic advisor for Solomon R. Guggenheim. In 1939, Guggenheim and Rebay opened the Museum of Non-objective Painting, later named the Solomon R. Guggenheim Museum. Some of Budnick's early work is classified with other works of the Museum of Non-objective Painting.

Later work exhibited at the Portland Lawrence Gallery in 2008

After serving in the army during World War II, Budnick earned his Bachelor of Arts degree at the IIT Institute of Design. While there, he studied under László Moholy-Nagy, the founding director of the New Bauhaus and head of the School of Design (renamed the Institute of Design in 1944).

In 1952 he completed his Master of Architecture at the Harvard Graduate School of Design, studying under Walter Gropius, the founder of the Bauhaus school in Germany.

Budnick was an architect for the Department of Parks and Recreation for the State of California for many years. While earning his living as an architect to support his wife and three children, he continued to paint throughout his life until he died in 1994 in Oregon.

Budnick's work was included in an exhibition organized by Katherine Kuh at the Art Institute of Chicago in 1948, entitled "American Abstract and Surrealist Art." His work is included in the collections of the Guggenheim Museum, Museum of Modern Art and the J. Donald Nichols collection.
