= Budnik (Bulgarian) =

Bulgarian Christmas tradition

Budnik (Bulgarian: Бъдник), refers to a log brought into the house and placed on the fire on the evening of Christmas Eve, a central tradition in Christmas celebrations in Bulgaria, Bosnia and Herzegovina, Croatia, North Macedonia, Serbia, and Montenegro, much like a yule log in other European traditions. In the Bulgarian, Croatian, and Serbian languages, the name for Christmas Eve is derived from the term badnjak or budnik as well as the Bulgarian name for Christmas Eve (bg:Бъдни вечер). The tree from which the log is cut, preferably a young and straight oak, is ceremonially felled early on the morning of Christmas Eve. The felling, preparation, bringing in, and laying on the fire, are surrounded by elaborate rituals, with many regional variations.

Bulgaria's Orthodox Church turned to the Revised Julian calendar in 1968. Since then, Bulgaria has celebrated Christmas on December 25, therefore, most celebrate Christmas Eve (Budni Vecher) on December 24.

== Etymology ==
The term budnik comes from the Bulgarian/Slavic word budeshte, which means "future". This is because it of the hope that the night will bring prosperity to the home in the future. It is similar to the Serbian term badnjak, which is derived from the word "to stay awake".

== Preparations ==
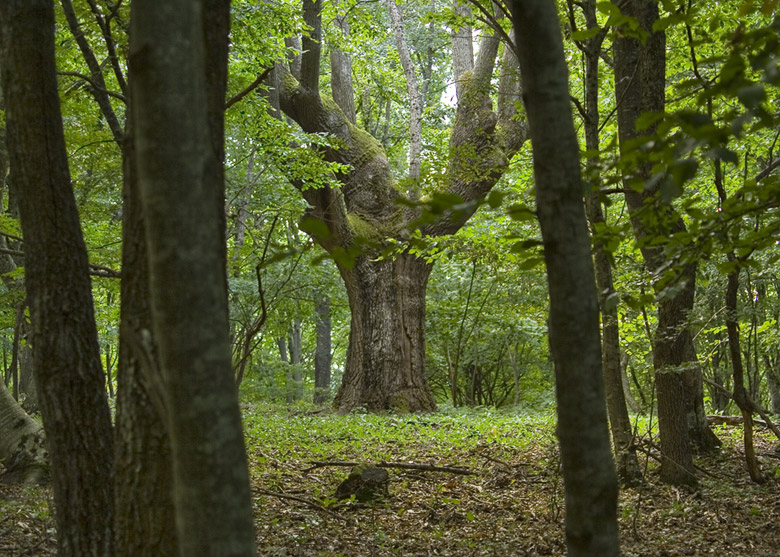
An oak like these in the Bulgarian mountains are most likely to be used for the budnik

In Bulgaria, it is an important part of Christmas Eve preparations. Traditionally a young man of the family was sent dressed in his best clothes to cut down an oak, elm, or pear tree. That tree is used as the Budnik (bg:Бъдник). A prayer for forgiveness was necessary before it could be chopped down and carried on one's right shoulder as it is not allowed to touch the ground. An indication of the importance of the ritual is that Christmas Eve translates to Budnik or Budnik Eve (Бъдни вечер) in Bulgaria. In some regions, upon the man's return he asks "Do you glorify the Young God?" three times and receive a positive answer "We glorify Him, welcome". After that a hole is bored in one end of the budnik and filled with Chrism made of wine, olive oil, and incense. The hole is plugged, and that end of the log is wrapped with a white linen cloth before the badnik is festively burned on the hearth. The entire family gathers around the burning of the log, where they offer prayers that the coming year brings food, happiness, love, luck, and riches. The log burns on throughout Christmas Day, when the first visitor strikes it with a poker or a branch to make sparks fly, requesting that the family's happiness and prosperity be as abundant as the sparks.

The log is considered to possess special healing powers and the ritual includes songs and uttering of wishes as the log is lit. The log has to burn all night and it is believed that its warmth and light symbolise the coming of Christ as well as providing a warm welcome to Virgin Mary and the family's ancestors, who are believed to be guests at the table according to traditions in some regions. Sometimes the fire is put out using wine in the morning. Remains of the log are cherished and sometimes used to make personal crosses, but mostly its ashes are spread over a field or vineyard to induce better yields.
