= Torchesk =

Coordinates: 49.6839°N 30.6375°E

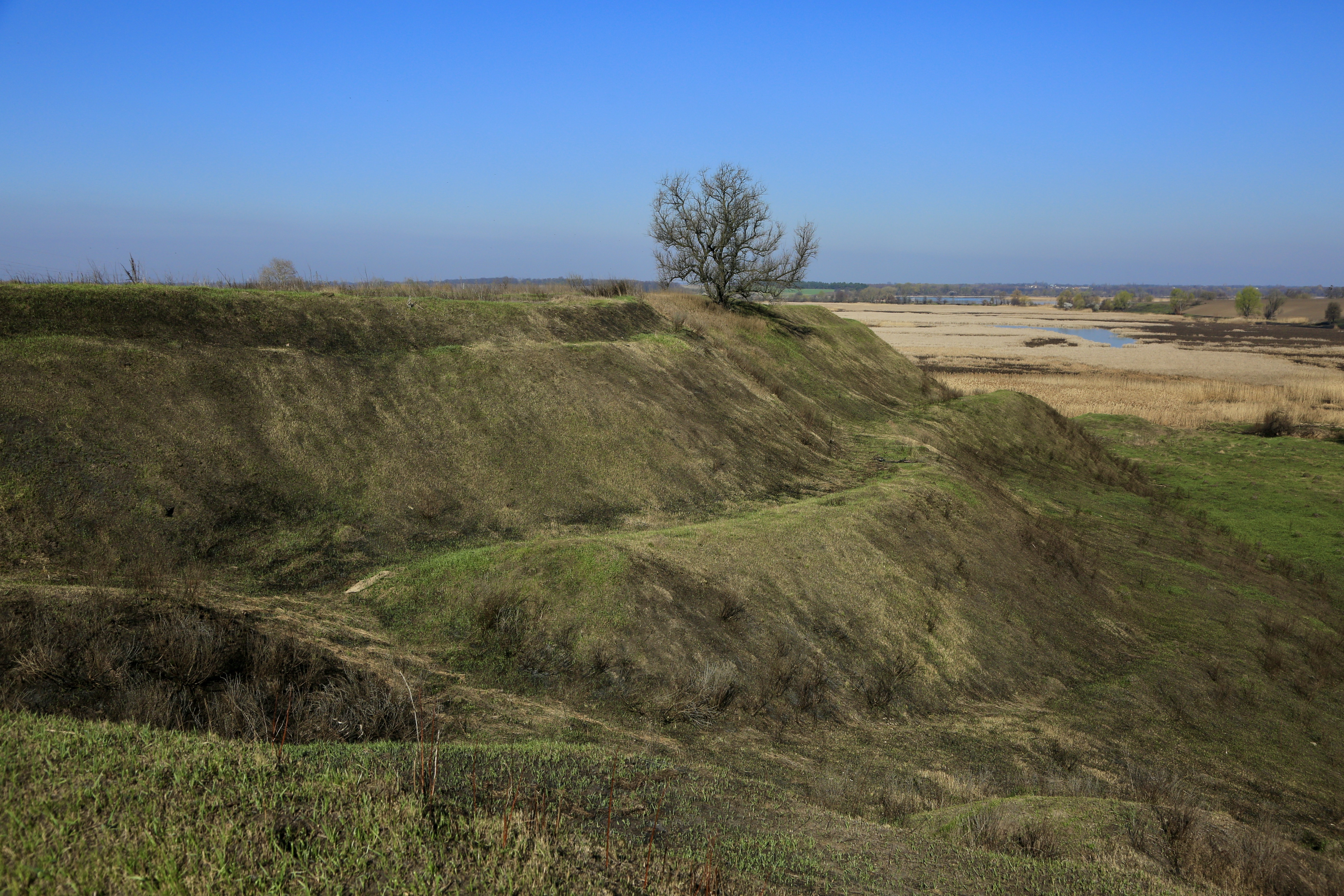
- Hillfort of Torchesk
- Interactive map of Torchesk

History
- Abandoned: 13th century

Immovable Monument of National Significance of Ukraine
- Official name: Городище літописного міста Торчеська (Hillfort of the legendary city of Torchesk)
- Type: Archaeology
- Reference no.: 100020-Н

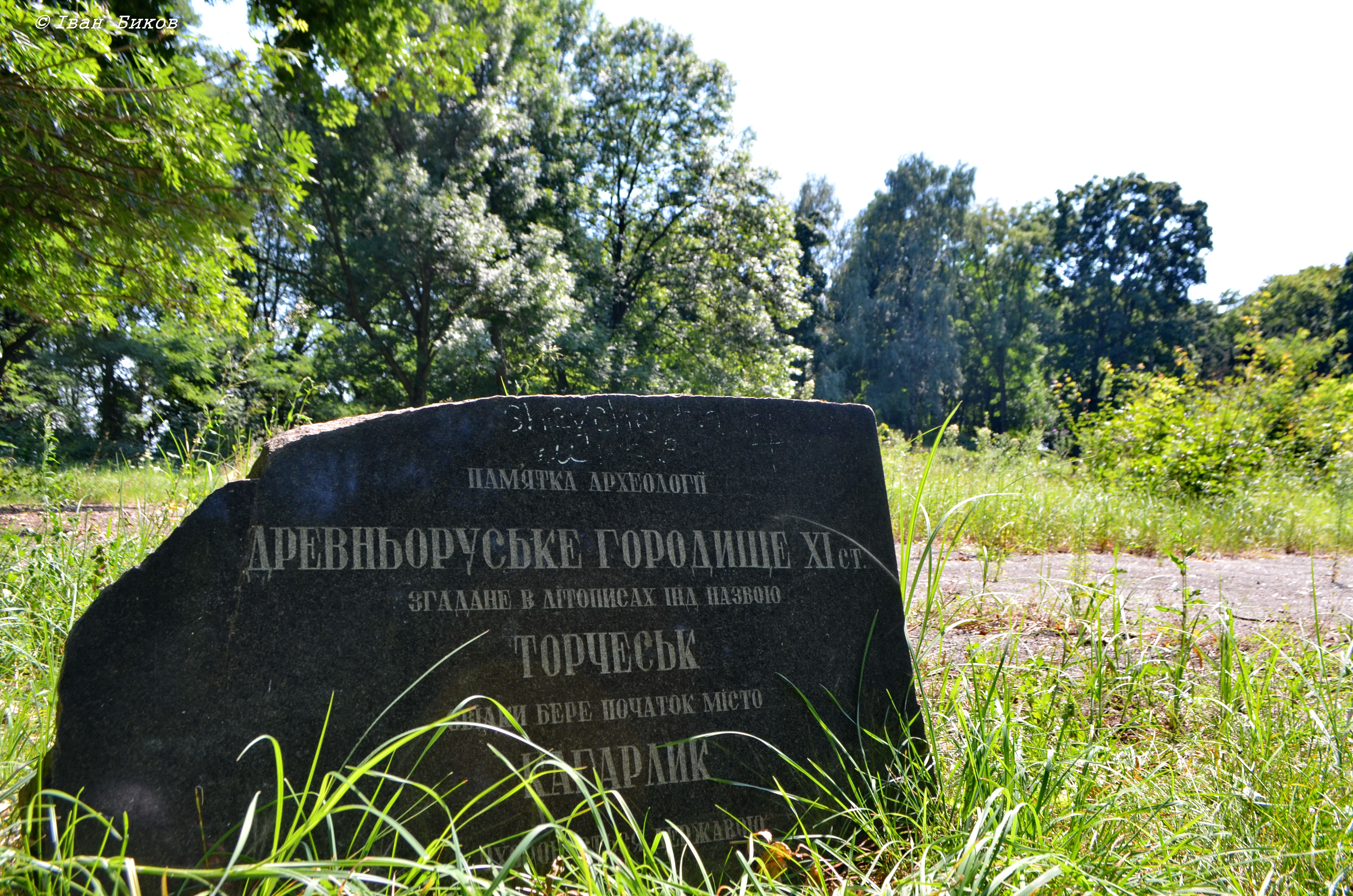
Sign in the Kaharlyk city park commemorated to the Torchesk city

Torchesk (Ukrainian: Торчеськ; Russian: Торческ) was a medieval town, located between today's villages of Olshanytsia and Sharky in Kyiv Oblast (province) of central Ukraine near Kaharlyk.

Torchesk was first mentioned in a chronicle under the year of 1093 as the center of the Torks (and later Chorni Klobuky), who settled along the Ros River valley and served Kievan princes. In the second half of the 12th century, Torchesk became the capital of a principality, with its rulers being appointed by the grand princes of Kiev.

Torchesk was last mentioned in a chronicle in 1234. It appears that the town was destroyed by the Mongol invasions.
