= Berendei =

Extinct Turkic people

The Berendei or Berindei (Romanian: Berindei; Ukrainian: Берендеї, romanized: Berendeyi; Russian: берендеи, romanized: berendei, перендеи perendei, перендичи; Hungarian: berendek; Polish: Berendejowie) were a medieval Turkic tribe, most likely of Kipchak origin. They were part of the tribal confederation of the "peak caps" or the "black hats" (the Chorni Klobuky, in Turkic karakalpak).

== Origins ==
The Berindeis were semi-nomadic and have been documented as holding various military positions, such as that of "frontier guards" on the payroll of Rus' lords. The Berindeis are mentioned in the chronicles of the Kievan Rus' in the 11th and 12th centuries as "Chornye Klobuki" and, together with the Pechenegs and Uzs, became settled along the borders of the Rus' steppes. Some rebel Berindei tribes took refuge in territories which are part of today's Romania. Most of the Berindeis remained on the territories of the Kiev and Pereyaslavl principalities, where they functioned as cavalry troops in the region of the lower Dnieper river.

== Assimilation ==
During the 12th century, the Berindeis were already assimilated, but also maintained their own military aristocracy. After the Berindei nobility were accepted by the elite of the Kievan Rus' state, towns were created by the new nobility and started to flourish. The Berindei cavalry continued to remain active against the raids undertaken by the Cumans. In 1177, a Cuman-Kipchak army, allied with Ryazan, sacked six cities belonging to the Berendei and Torkil.

After the great Mongol invasion of 1241, some Berindeis and other Turkic peoples moved to Bulgaria to join with those who had already taken refuge in Hungary. The rest of these tribes mixed with the nomad population of the Golden Horde, where after, the historians at this time ceased with the usage of the Berindei tribal name.

== Placename connections ==
Some of Turkic placenames in south of Kyiv Oblast and in Cherkasy Oblast, namely Kaharlyk, Karapyshi, Tahancha, Koshmak, are believed to be connected to the Berendei. Additionally, so is the name of the city of Berdychiv in southern part of Zhytomyr Oblast, which is founded by the "Berendychi".

Also, there is a village called Berendi in the town of Serik, located in the Antalya province of Turkey. The people of this village are known as "coz", or settled people. Berendi is one of the oldest villages in the region, and since the word for non-settled people in Turkish is "cuz", the villagers of Berendi are conjectured to be the descendants of Muslim Pechenegs who were also designated as "coz" historically. An example of a "cuz" or nomadic people, are the Yörüks of Antalya, who are direct descendants of the Oghuz Turks.

There are two villages called Berende in Bulgaria, which names, according to the linguist Anna Choleva–Dimitrova, stem from the Berendei tribe.

== Berendei names in Romania ==
In modern-day Romania, the Berindeis were documented to have lived in Teleorman County, around the town of Roșiorii de Vede together with the Pechenegs, Uzs, and Cumans. In Olt County, there is also a Berindei village.

Berindei (occasionally spelled Berindey) survives into modern times, designated as a family name. This is the surname of several noted Romanian personalities such as the architects Ion. D. Berindey, Dimitrie I. Berindey, and the general Anton Berindei born in Roșiorii de Vede; the architects Ion (Johny) Berindei and Ion Berindei, the historians Dan Berindei and Mihnea Berindei; the jazz musicians Emil Berindey, Mihai Berindei, and Ștefan Berindei.

During the communist regime in Romania (1945–1989), many Berindeis have emigrated to Europe and the United States.
