= Mstislav the Eyeless =

Mstislav Rostislavich Bezokii (or Mstislav "The Eyeless") (Russian: Мстислав Ростиславич Безокий) (died 1178) was Prince of Rostov (1175–1176) and Prince of Novgorod the Great (1160–1161, 1177–1178).

== Biography ==
He was son of Rostislav Yuryevich. Mstislav the Eyeless received his sobriquet (nickname) after being defeated by Vsevolod III "The Big Nest" in 1176 and being blinded along with his brother, Iaropolk and brother-in-law, Gleb. According to several chronicles, he and his brother traveled to Smolensk after their blinding and were miraculously cured there in the Church of Boris and Gleb, after which he traveled to Novgorod where he was made prince again. He died there a year later and is buried in the Cathedral of Holy Wisdom.
