= Budnik (surname) =

Budnik is a surname. Notable people with the surname include:

- Andrey Budnik (1953–2018), Russian diplomat
- Dan Budnik (1933–2020), American photographer
- Jerzy Budnik (born 1951), Polish politician
- Jowita Budnik (born 1973), Polish actress
- Mike Budnik (born 1974), American mixed martial artist
- Yelena Budnik (born 1976), Belarusian sprinter
- Yevhen Budnik (born 1990), Ukrainian footballer
- Eugenie Budnik (born 2002), American journalist
