= Mihnea Berindei =

- Born: Mihnea Berindei; 22 March 1948; Bucharest, Romania
- Died: 19 June 2016 (aged 68); Venice, Italy
- Citizenship: Romanian; French
- Occupation: Historian
- Father: Dan Berindei

Mihnea Berindei (22 March 1948 – 19 June 2016) was a Romanian-born French historian.

He was born in Bucharest, the son of historian Dan Berindei, and studied at the Faculty of History of the University of Bucharest from 1966 to 1970. Under the guidance of Mihail Guboglu, he learned old Turkic and became interested in the study of the Ottoman Empire. He went to Turkey to find documentation, and then went to Paris, where he studied at the École pratique des hautes études, graduating in 1972.

After the Romanian Revolution of 1989, Berindei was instrumental in the creation of the Group for Social Dialogue. After 2000, he participated in the restitution for historians of the archives of the Romanian Communist Party and was a member of the Presidential Commission for the Study of the Communist Dictatorship in Romania.

On 22 June 2016, Romanian President Klaus Iohannis awarded post-mortem to Berindei the National Order of Faithful Service, Knight rank.
