= Dan Berindei =

Romanian historian (1923–2021)

Dan Berindei (3 November 1923 – 23 December 2021) was a Romanian historian. He was a titular member of the Romanian Academy from 1992 until his death.

== Biography ==
A descendant of Prince Constantin Brâncoveanu, he was born in Bucharest on 3 November 1923. After attending the Clemența School, Berindei completed his secondary education at the Spiru Haret High School. He then studied history at the University of Bucharest, graduating in 1945.

In February 1945 he married Ioana Berindei (1922–2008), the daughter of historian and politician Ion Hudiță. The two had a son, noted historian Mihnea Berindei (1948–2016). Their daughter, Ruxandra, was born in 1951 at Văcărești Prison, while her mother was incarcerated there by the communist authorities; Berindei only saw his daughter after 11 months, while her mother was still detained at Mislea Prison.

He obtained a doctorate in history from the University of Bucharest in 1969, with thesis "Orașul București, reședință și capitală a Țării Românești (1459–1862)". From 1955 to 1990 he was a researcher at the Nicolae Iorga Institute of History, after which he was a professor at the University of Bucharest and at Politehnica University of Bucharest.

Berindei died in Bucharest on 23 December 2021, at the age of 98, and was buried in the city's Bellu Cemetery.

=== Honours ===
- (Romania) Romanian Royal Family: Knight of the Royal Decoration of the Cross of the Romanian Royal House
