= Andrey Bogolyubsky =

Grand Prince of Vladimir from 1157 to 1174

Saint Andrew Yuryevich Bogolubsky
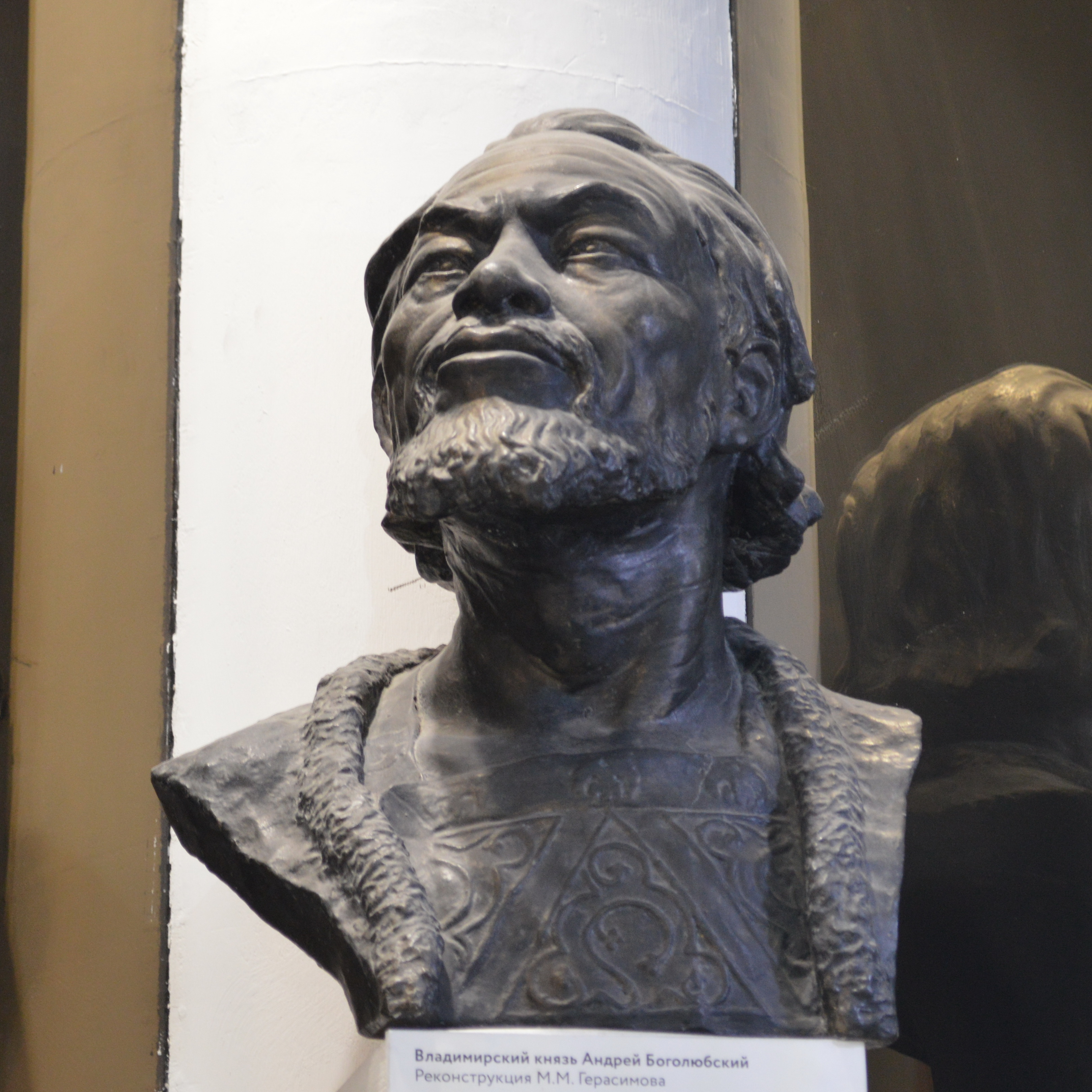
- Andrey Bogolyubsky. Facial reconstruction by Gerasimov.

Right-Believing, Passion Bearer
- Born: 1111; Rostov, Kievan Rus'
- Died: 28 June 1174; Bogolyubovo, Vladimir-Suzdal
- Venerated in: Eastern Orthodox Church
- Canonized: 15 October 1702 (Translation), Dormition Cathedral, Vladimir by Russian Orthodox Church
- Major shrine: Dormition cathedral, Vladimir
- Feast: 4 July (burial), 30 June, 23 June, 10 October, 25 May
- Attributes: Clothed as a Russian Grand Prince, holding a three-bar cross in his right hand
- Patronage: Russian NBC Protection Troops

Andrey I Yuryevich Bogolyubsky (Russian: Андрей Ю́рьевич Боголюбский, lit. 'Andrey Yuryevich of Bogolyubovo'; died 28 June 1174) was Prince of Vladimir-Suzdal from 1157 until his death. During repeated internecine wars between the princely clans, Andrey accompanied his father Yuri Dolgorukiy during a brief capture of Kiev in 1149. 20 years later, his son led the Sack of Kiev (1169). He was canonized as a saint in the Russian Orthodox Church in 1702.

== Biography ==
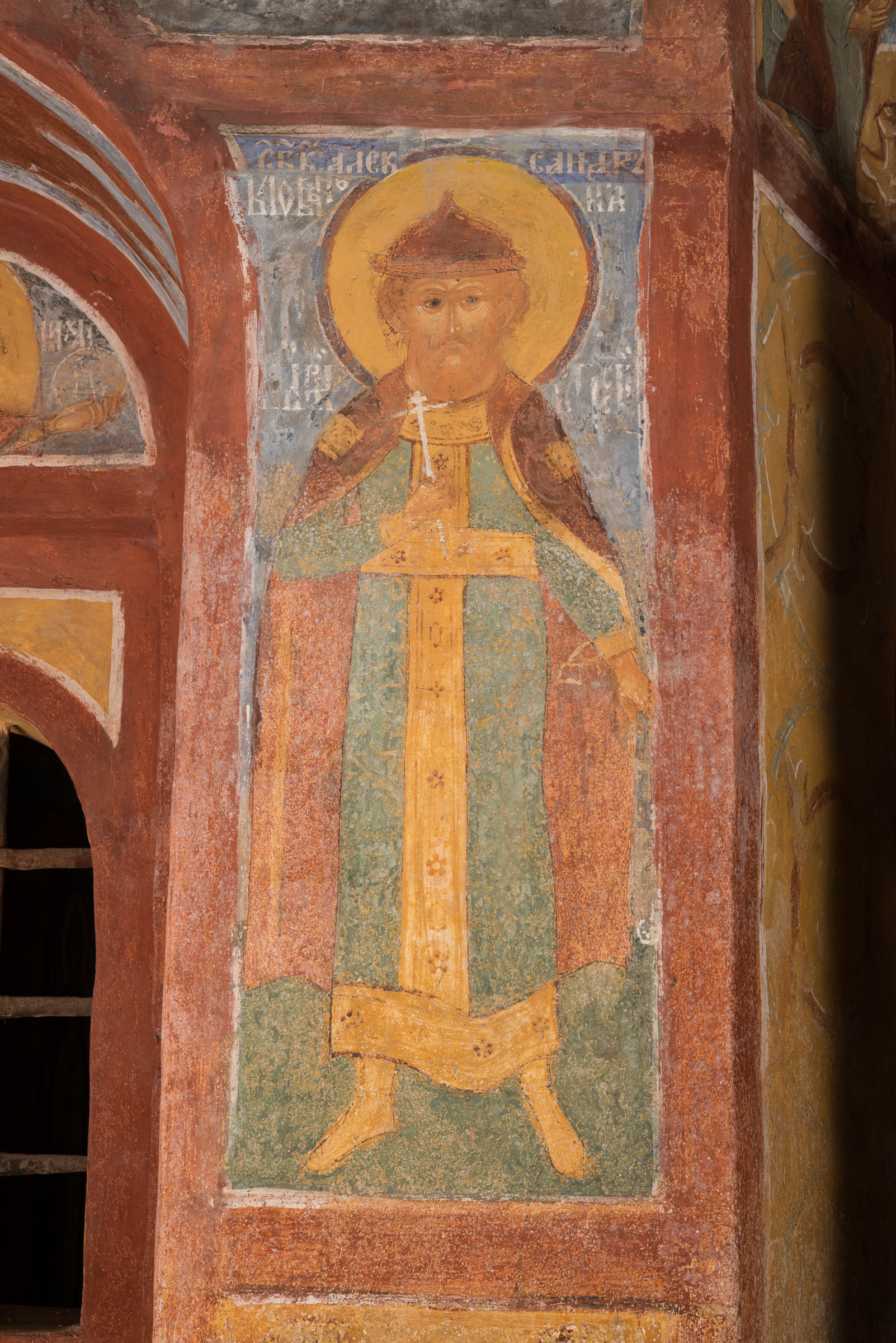
Image of Saint Andrew Yuryevich in a 17th century church

According to the Primary Chronicle (PVL), Andrey's parents married on 12 January 1108, as part of a peace agreement between the Rus' and the Cumans (Polovtsi). Andrey's father was Yuri Vladimirovich (Russian: Юрий Владимирович), Prince of Rostov and Suzdal commonly known as Yuri Dolgoruki (Russian: Юрий Долгорукий), a son of Volodimer II Monomakh, progenitor of the Monomakhovichi. Andrey's mother was an unnamed Cuman princess, a daughter of Aepa son of Osen'. From this marriage, Andrey Bogolyubsky was born in c. 1111. Yuri proclaimed Andrey a prince in Vyshgorod (near Kiev).

=== Seizing power (1155–1162) ===
Andrey left Vyshgorod in 1155 and moved to Vladimir, a little town on the river Klyazma founded in 1108. In doing so, he removed the Icon of the Blessed Mother of God from Vyshgorod to Vladimir (thereafter known as the "Virgin of Vladimir"), an action condemned as theft by the Kievan Chronicle, while the Suzdalian Chronicle made no judgement on it. In 1153 he was the Prince of Murom-Ryazan. After his father's death in 1157, Andrey ousted his younger brothers Mikhail "Mikhalko" Yurievich and Vsevolod "the Big Nest" from Rostov and Suzdal in 1162, thus uniting his father's patrimony in Vladimir-Suzdal under his sole rule (samovlastets). He expelled his four brothers to the Byzantine Empire together with their mother, Yuri's second wife.

Andrey established for himself the right to receive tribute from the populations of the Northern Dvina lands.

=== Construction works ===
He commenced the construction of fortifications around the town of Vladimir in 1158 (completed in 1164), as well as the Dormition Cathedral in Vladimir. In 1162 or 1164, Andrey sent an embassy to Constantinople, lobbying for a separate metropolitan see in Vladimir, but he was overruled by the patriarch of Constantinople. Fortifications around Vladimir were completed in 1164. The same year Andrey attacked the Volga Bolgars; he won a victory, but according to later traditions, a son was killed in battle, to whose memory he supposedly ordered the construction of the Church of the Intercession on the Nerl in 1165.

=== Sack of Kiev and brief overlordship (1169–1171) ===
In March 1169 Andrey's troops sacked Kiev, devastating it as never before. Andrey did not take part in the attack; he stayed in Vladimir-Suzdal while his troops sacked the capital. After plundering the city, stealing much religious artwork, many books and valuables and devastating houses and religious buildings alike, Andrew claimed the title of Grand Prince, although he kept his residence at Vladimir, and emphasized the Byzantine religious heritage of Vladimir to assert Vladimir's prestige and ecclesiastical independence from Kiev. Andrey had his brother Gleb appointed as prince of Kiev, in an attempt to create a position of overlordship for himself. This overlordship lasted for less than two years, ending with Gleb's death on 20 January 1171.

Andrey's attempts to control other parts of Kievan Rus' were barely successful either; his Siege of Novgorod (1170) was a failure, and the Suzdalians were defeated. Although he managed to later blackmail the Novgorodians by imposing a blockade on the trade hub, securing the princehood for his son Yury Bogolyubsky in 1171, the Novgorodians immediately expelled him upon Andrey's death in June 1174.

=== 1171–1173 Kievan succession crisis ===
Gleb's death in 1171 caused another Kievan succession crisis, and Andrey became embroiled in a two-year war to regain control over Kiev. When the Rostislavichi of Smolensk and Iziaslavichi of Volhynia jointly secured the throne of Kiev, Andrey assembled another coalition and marched on Vyshhorod in 1173, where the Yurievichi–Olgovichi forces of Suzdalia and Chernigov were utterly defeated.

=== Death ===
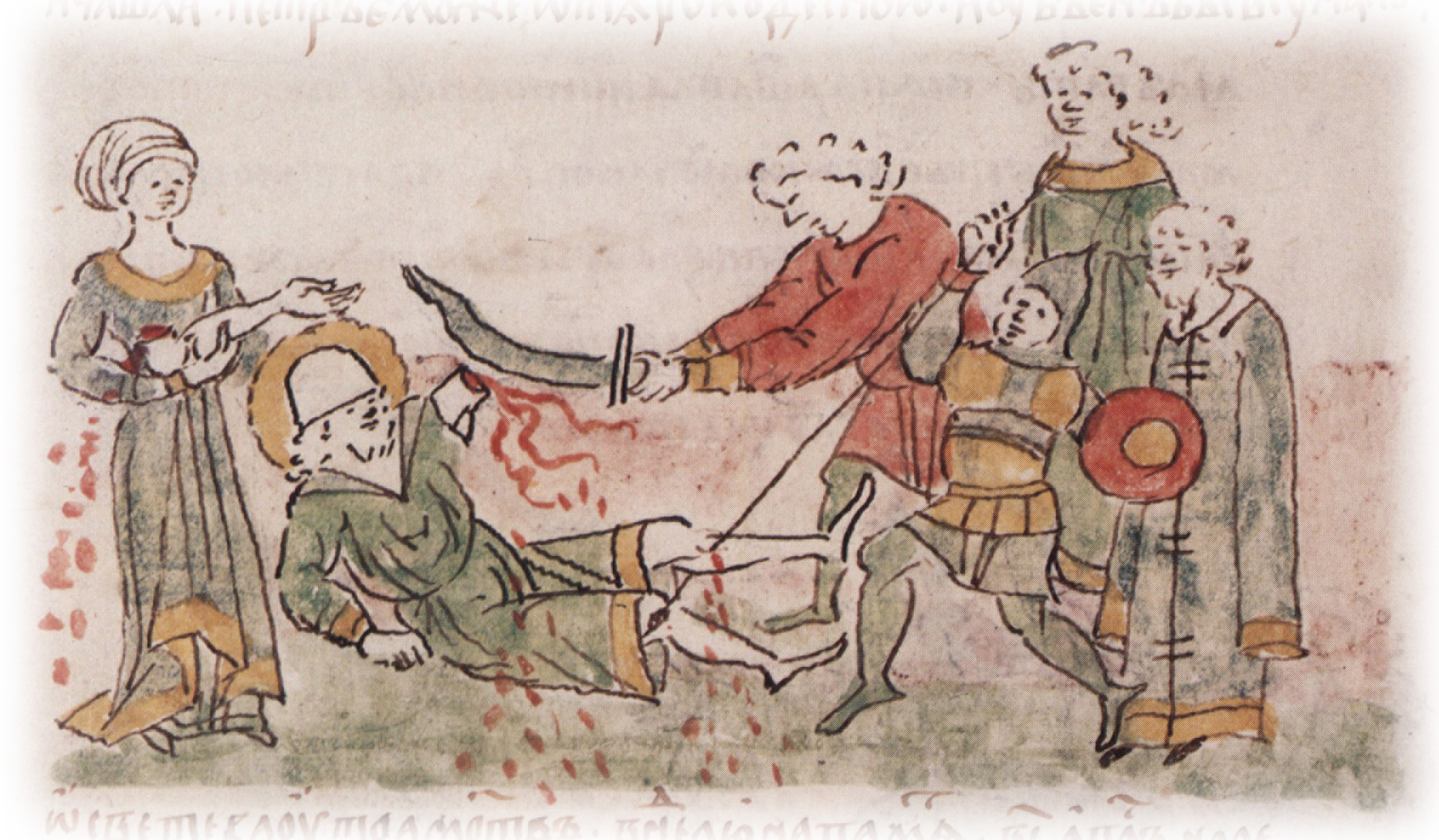
In this 15th-century Radziwiłł Chronicle miniature, Andrey Bogolyubsky's left arm is cut off by his assassins, although the texts claim his "right hand" was cut off. A 1965 autopsy of Andrey's body confirmed the left arm showed many cut marks.

The defeat of Andrey's second coalition at Vyshgorod, the expansion of his princely authority, and his conflicts with the upper nobility, the boyars, gave rise to a conspiracy that resulted in Bogolyubsky's death on the night of 28–29 June 1174, when twenty of them burst into his chambers and slew him in his bed.

According to the story of Andrey Bogolyubsky's death as recorded in the Kievan Chronicle of the Hypatian Codex (Ipatiev), and the Radziwiłł Chronicle, his "right hand" was cut off by an assailant called "Peter" (Петръ):

- Kievan Chronicle sub anno 6683 (1175 [sic]): Church Slavonic: Петръ же ѿтѧ ему руку десную. кнѧзь же вьзрѣвъ. на н҃бо. и реч̑ Гс̑и в руцѣ твои предаю тобѣ дх҃ъ мои. и тако оуспе оубьенъ же быс̑ в суботу на нощь., romanized: Petrŭ zhe ōtya emu ruku desnuju. knyazĭ zhe vĭzrěvŭ na nebo, i rech: Gospodi v rutsě tvoi predaju tobě dukhŭ moi. i tako ouspe oubĭenŭ zhe bys̑ v subotu na noshchĭ., lit. 'And Peter took from him his right hand. The prince looked upon heaven and said: 'Lord, into your hands I commit my spirit.' And so was he taken away on Saturday night.'
- Radziwiłł Chronicle sub anno 6683 (1175 [sic]): Church Slavonic: Петръ ему же от(ъ)тя руку десную. И убьенъ ж(е) быс(ть) в суб(оту) на ноч(ь)., romanized: Petrŭ emu zhe ot(ŭ)tya ruku desnuju. I ubĭenŭ zh(e) bys(tĭ) v sub(otu) na noch(ĭ)., lit. 'And Peter took his right hand from him. And he was killed on Saturday night.'

However, the Radziwiłł Chronicle's adjoining miniature depicts his assailants cutting off his left arm. Moreover, when Dmitry Gerasimovich Rokhlin examined the exhumed body of Andrey Bogolyubsky in 1965, he "found a lot of cut marks on the left humerus and forearm bones". A 2009 special historical study by Russian historian A.V. Artcikhovsky (2009) would later confirm Rokhlin's observations.

Andrey's death triggered the 1174–1177 Suzdalian war of succession.

== Descendants ==
Children:

- A son, Iziaslav Andreevich, reportedly buried in the Dormition Cathedral of Vladimir on 28 October 1164 (Kievan Chronicle) or 1165 (Suzdalian Chronicle). According to later traditions, reported by Janet Martin (2007), Iziaslav's death was related to the successful 1164 Suzdalian campaign against Volga Bulgaria, and Andrey supposedly commissioned the construction of the Church of the Intercession on the Nerl to commemorate this son in 1165. However, this connection is not mentioned in any chronicle until the 16th century; the Nerl church could be as old as 1158; and the Suzdalian Chronicle reports that everyone in Andrey's druzhina, which included Iziaslav, was in good health after the battle (а свою дружину всю сдраву, "and his druzhina all healthy").
- A son, Mstislav Andreevich; according to the Kievan Chronicle, he died on 28 March 1172 (incorrectly listed under the year "6681", which corresponds to 1173). According to Janet Martin (2007), Mstislav's death was related to the ill-fated 1171–1172 Suzdalian winter campaign against Volga Bulgaria. The Kievan and Suzdalian Chronicle agree that it was Mstislav Andreevich (Andreevič, Andrejevič) who commanded the Suzdalian-led coalition that sacked Kiev in 1169, and then installed his uncle Gleb (Andrey's brother) as prince of Kiev.
- A son, Yury Bogolyubsky alias Iurii Andreevich, born c. 1160. Prince of Novgorod, 1171–1173. Briefly the husband of Queen Tamar of Georgia until she divorced him (1185–1188).

== Legacy ==
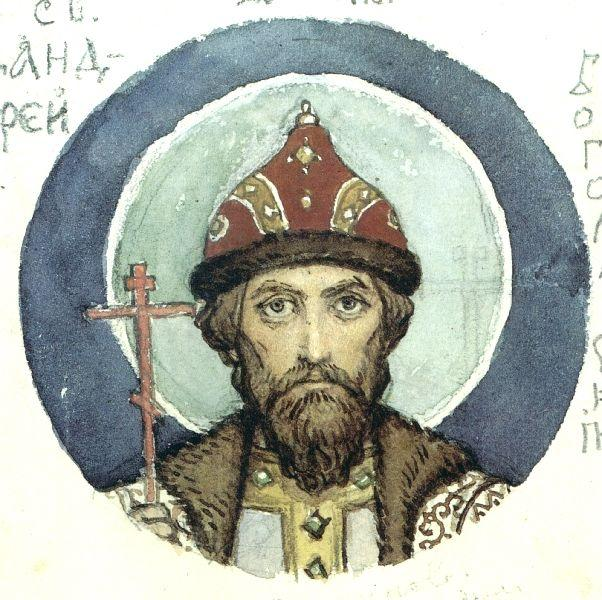
Prince Andrey Bogolyubsky, by Viktor Vasnetsov c. 1890

- In the Suzdalian Chronicle, columns 367–369 contain the Short eulogy to Andrey Bogolyubsky.
- In the Kievan Chronicle, columns 580–595 contain the Long eulogy to Andrey Bogolyubsky, also known as the Tale About the Slaying of Andrej Bogoljubskij (Povĕst' ob ubienii Andreja [Bogoljubskogo]).
- The ancient icon, Theotokos of Bogolyubovo, was painted in the 12th century at the request of Andrey Bogolyubsky.
- Andrey had the castle, Bogolyubovo, built near Vladimir, and it would become his favorite residence
- His victory over the Bulgars is remembered yearly during the Honey Feast of the Saviour.

== Bibliography ==
=== Primary sources ===
- Primary Chronicle (PVL; c. 1110s; oldest copy 1377).
  - Cross, Samuel Hazzard; Sherbowitz-Wetzor, Olgerd P. (1953) [1930]. The Russian Primary Chronicle, Laurentian Text. Translated and edited by Samuel Hazzard Cross and Olgerd P. Sherbowitz-Wetzor (PDF). Cambridge, Massachusetts: The Mediaeval Academy of America. p. 325.
- Kievan Chronicle (c. 1200; oldest copy c. 1425)
  - (Church Slavonic critical edition) Shakhmatov, Aleksey Aleksandrovich, ed. (1908). Ipat'evskaya letopis' Ипатьевская лѣтопись [The Hypatian Codex]. Complete Collection of Russian Chronicles (PSRL) (in Church Slavic). Vol. 2 (3rd ed.). Saint Petersburg: Typography of M. A. Aleksandrov / Izbornyk. pp. 285–301.
  - (modern English translation) Heinrich, Lisa Lynn (1977). The Kievan Chronicle: A Translation and Commentary (PhD diss.). Nashville, Tennessee: Vanderbilt University. p. 616. ProQuest 7812419
  - (modern Ukrainian translation) Makhnovets, Leonid (1989). Літопис Руський за Іпатським списком [Rus' Chronicle according to the Hypatian Codex] (in Ukrainian). Kyiv: Dnipro. p. 591. ISBN 5-308-00052-2. — A modern annotated Ukrainian translation of the Kievan Chronicle based on the Hypatian Codex with comments from the Khlebnikov Codex.
- Radziwiłł Chronicle (c. 1490s)
  - Iroshnikov, M. P.; Kukushkina, M. V.; Lurie, Y. S. (1989). Том Тридцать Восьмой: Радзивиловская Летопись [Volume Thirty-Eight: Radziwiłł Chronicle]. Complete Collection of Russian Chronicles (PSRL). M. D. Priselkov, O. P. Likhacheva, R. M. Mavrodina, E. K. Piotrovskaya. Leningrad (Saint Petersburg): Nauka. p. 179.

=== Literature ===
- Martin, Janet (1995). Medieval Russia: 980-1584. Cambridge University Press. ISBN 9780521368322.
  - Martin, Janet (2007). Medieval Russia: 980–1584. Second Edition. E-book. Cambridge: Cambridge University Press. ISBN 978-0-511-36800-4.
- Marquez-Grant, Nicholas; Fibiger, Linda (2011). The Routledge Handbook of Archaeological Human Remains and Legislation: An international guide to laws and practice in the excavation and treatment of archaeological human remains. Abingdon: Routledge. p. 800. ISBN 9781136879555.
- Paszkiewicz. H. (1954). The Origin of Russia. Chicago: The University of Chicago Press.
  - Review: Vernadsky, George (1955). "Reviewed work: The Origin of Russia, Henryk Paszkiewicz". Speculum. 30 (2): 293–301. doi:10.2307/2848497. JSTOR 2848497.
  - Review: Jakobson, Roman (1955). "Reviewed work: The Origin of Russia, Henryk Paszkiewicz". The American Historical Review. 61 (1): 106–108. doi:10.2307/1845345. JSTOR 1845345.
- Pelenski, Jaroslaw (1987). "The Sack of Kiev of 1169: Its Significance for the Succession to Kievan Rus'". Harvard Ukrainian Studies. 11 (3). Harvard Ukrainian Research Institute: 303–316. JSTOR 41036277. Reprinted in Pelenski, The Contest for the Legacy of Kievan Rus'.
- Pelenski, Jaroslaw (1988). "The Contest for the "Kievan Succession" (1155–1175): The Religious-Ecclesiastical Dimension". Harvard Ukrainian Studies. 12/13: 776. JSTOR 41036344.
- Plokhy, Serhii (2006), The Origins of the Slavic Nations (PDF), Cambridge University Press, p. 42, ISBN 9780521864039, archived from the original (PDF) on March 29, 2017
- Raffensperger, Christian; Ostrowski, Donald (2023). The Ruling Families of Rus: Clan, Family and Kingdom. London: Reaktion Books. p. 309. ISBN 978-1-78914-745-2. (e-book)

Preceded by Yury Dolgoruky	Grand Prince of Vladimir	Succeeded by Michael I
