= Budnik (hamlet) =

Budnik Будник
- Derevnia
- Location within Pskov Oblast Location within Russia
- Coordinates: 57°44′19″N 28°26′6″E
- Country: Russia
- Region: Pskov Oblast
- District: Pskovsky District

Population (2010)
  - Total: 4
- Time zone: UTC+3:00

Budnik (Russian: Будник) is a hamlet in the Yadrovskaya Volost, part of the Pskovsky District of Pskov Oblast, Russia. Population: 4 (2010 census); 4 (2002 census); .

== Geography ==
Budnik is located on the left bank of the Cheryokha, 2 km (1.2 mi) east of the village of Cheryokha.

== Population ==
In 2000, the population numbered 2 people.

== Notable people ==
In local lore, Budnik is the alleged birthplace of Vladimir the Great (ca.958–1015), the prince who Christianized the Kievan Rus'.
