= Black Klobuks =

Extinct Turkic people

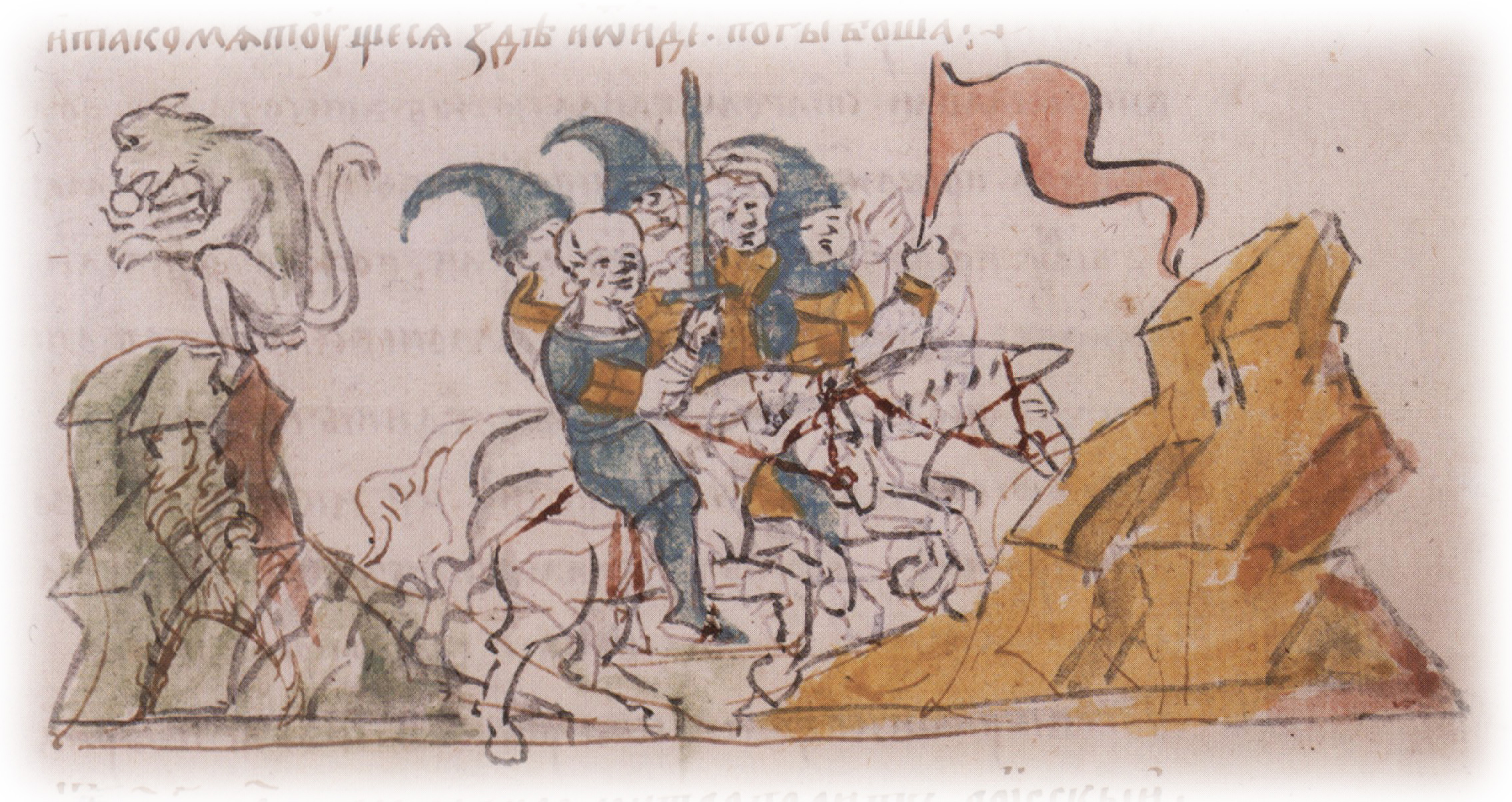
The Torks and Berendei flee from Rus', 1121. They are depicted with dark hats in this miniature from the Radziwiłł Chronicle (15th century).

Chorni Klobuky (Ukrainian: Чорні клобуки, romanized: Chorni klobuky) or Chornye Klobuki (Russian: Чёрные клобуки, romanized: Chërnyye klobuki), meaning "black hats", was a generic name for a group of semi-nomadic Turkic tribes of Berendei, Torki, Kovui of Chernihiv, Pechenegs, and others that at the end of 12th century settled on the southern frontier of Kiev and Pereyaslav principalities along the Ros River valley.

== History ==
The Black Klobuks are first mentioned as such in the Kievan Chronicle under the year 1146.

In the 12th century, many of these tribes became sedentary and town-based (within modern Cherkasy and southern Kyiv oblasts). Their main city was Torchesk (next to the modern city of Kaharlyk). They also were used by Rus' princes for the defense of their southern borders against Cumans (Polovtsi), and took part in the political life of Kievan Rus'.

After the Mongol invasion, they were partially assimilated by neighboring peoples, and partially deported by Golden Horde rulers such as Uzbeg Khan (between 1340–1390) to the Central Asia. Their name means "Black Hats" or "Black Hoods", and in Turkic languages it is "Karakalpak"; presumably this refers to their national costume. It is unclear whether the Chornyi Klobuki are related to the Karakalpaks of today.

In the Moscow Chronicle collection of the end of the 15th century under the year 1152, it is alleged that all Chorni Klobuky were called Circassians as they arrived from the North Caucasus.

Klym Polishchuk's short story "God of the Chorni Klobuky" is based on a Ukrainian legend. The story comprises Treasure of the Ages: Ukrainian Legends [Skarby vikiv: Ukrainski Lehendy].

== See also ==
- Karapapakhs
