= Upper nobility =

Highest stratum of the temporal society

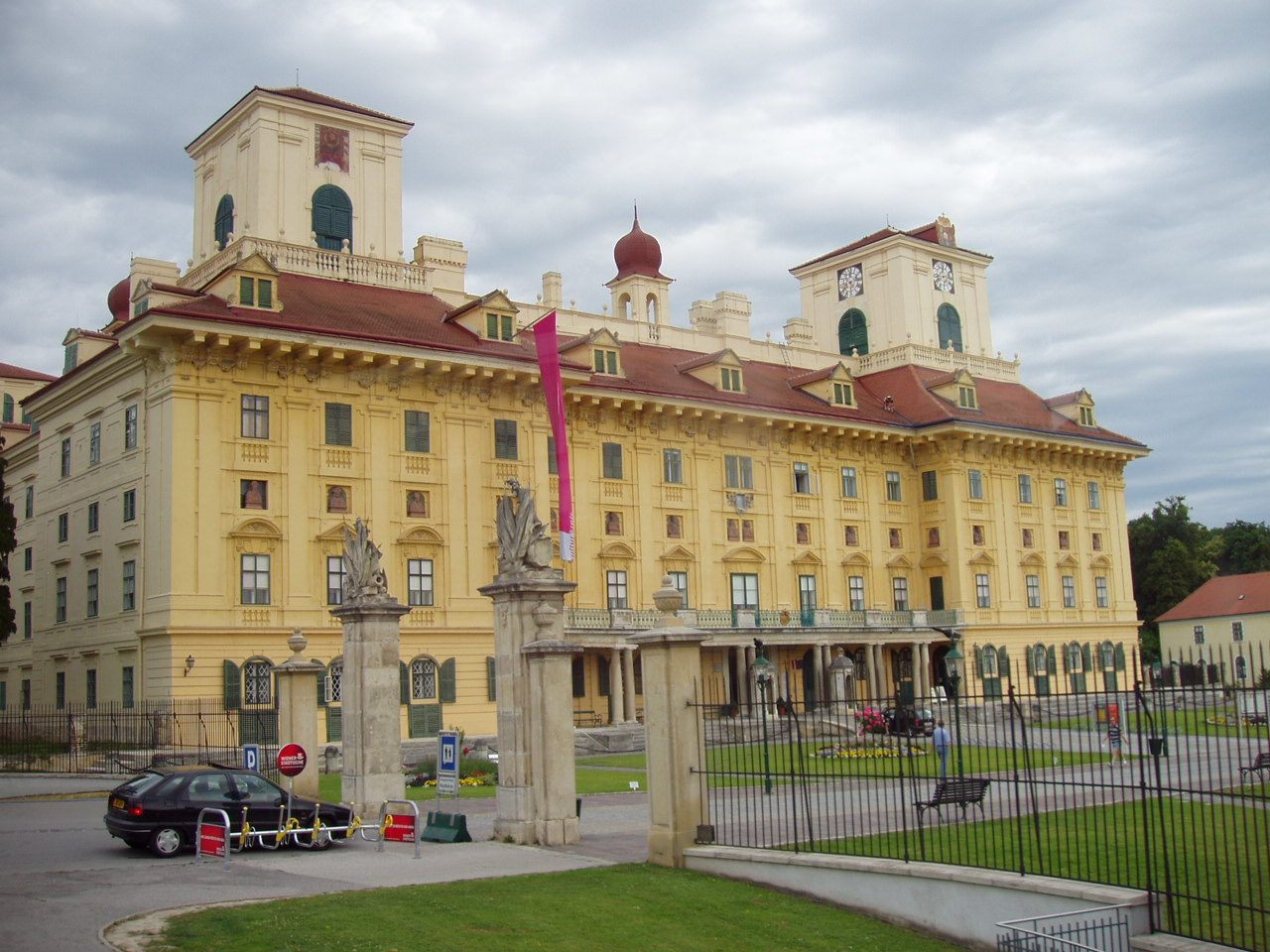
The Esterházy Palace in Kismarton (today Eisenstadt in Austria) - a seat of the wealthiest aristocratic family of the Kingdom of Hungary

The upper nobility (Hungarian: főnemesség, Latin: barones) was the highest stratum of the temporal society in the Kingdom of Hungary until 1946 when the Parliament passed an act that prohibited the use of noble titles, following the declaration of the Republic of Hungary.

== Upper nobility ==
In the course of the 11th to 15th centuries, only people who held specific high offices in the royal administration or in the Royal Households were distinguished by law within the nobility, but from the 16th century, families whose ancestors had been authorized by the monarchs to use a distinctive noble title (e.g., baron, count) formed a hereditary social class.

Its first members descended from the leaders of the Magyar tribes and clans and from the western knights who immigrated to the Kingdom of Hungary in the course of the 10-12th centuries. They were the "men distinguished by birth and dignity" (maiores natu et dignitate) mentioned frequently in the charters of the first kings. From the 1210s, the dignitaries of the central administration and the Royal Households were referred to as "barons of the realm" (barones regni) in official documents but their legal status was exclusively linked to the office they held and their offspring could not inherit it.

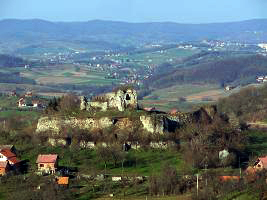
The Cetin Castle (in Croatia) - a fortress owned by the Counts Frankopans from the 14th century

In 1193, King Béla III granted Modruš County in Croatia to Bartolomej, the ancestor of the Frankopans (Frangepán) family; thenceforward, he and his descendants used the hereditary title count but no specific privileges were connected to it. Quite to the contrary, the theory of the "one and same liberty" (una eademque libertas) of the nobles strengthened and finally, it became enacted in 1351. From 1397, the descendants of the "barons of the realm" were referred to as "barons' sons" (filii baronum) or magnates (magnates) in official documents and from the 1430s, they received the honorific magnificus, an expression that had earlier been used only when addressing the "barons of the realm".

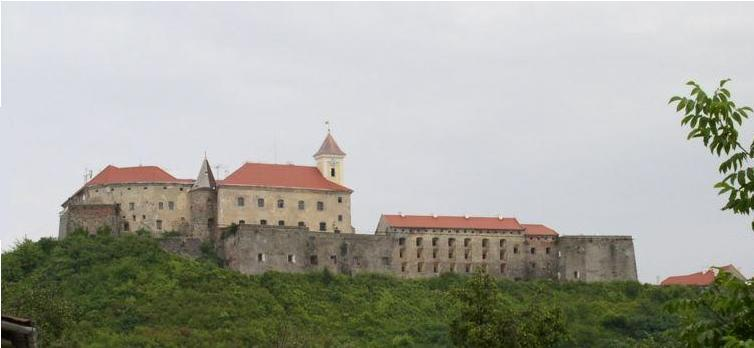
The Munkács Castle (today Mukachevo in Ukraine) - the seat of Prince Fyodor Koriatovych at the turn of the 14-15th centuries

Besides the Counts Frankopan, the members of foreign ruling houses and the nobles of foreign origin who held offices in the royal administration or owned estates in the Kingdom of Hungary (e.g., Duke Ladislaus of Opole, Prince Fyodor Koriatovych, the Despot Stefan Lazarević and Count Hermann II of Celje) were the first individuals who used noble titles, but in theory, their legal status was still equal to that of the poorest members of the lesser nobility. Similarly, the status of the brothers Szentgyörgyi did not change when they were rewarded with the hereditary title count of the Roman Empire in 1459 by Frederick III, Holy Roman Emperor who had been claiming the throne for himself against King Matthias I.

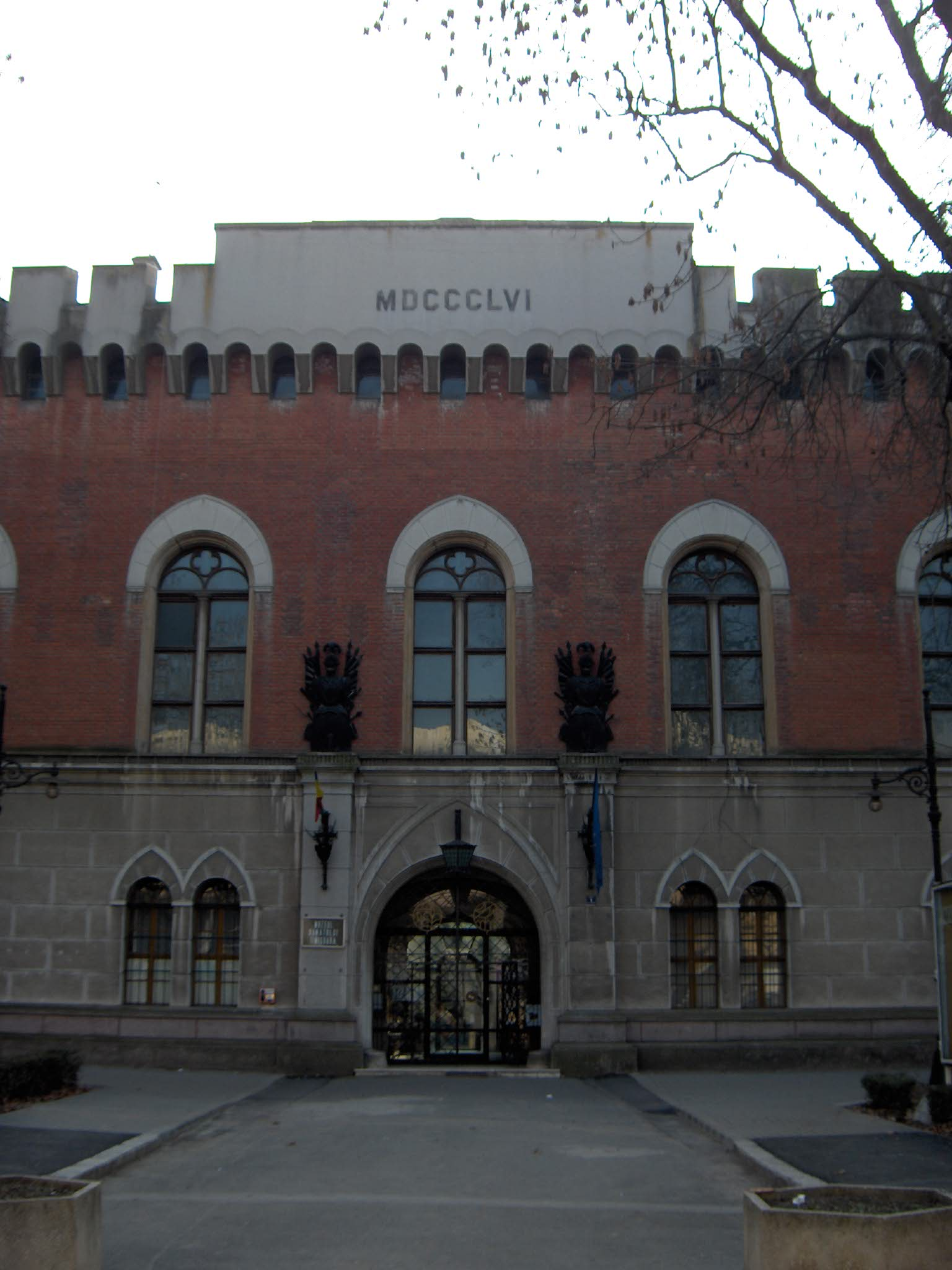
The Hunyadi Castle in Temesvár (today Timișoara in Romania), built in the 15th century

King Matthias I also rewarded his partisans with hereditary titles when he appointed them to hereditary heads of counties (hæreditarius supremus comes) and authorized them to use red sealing wax (similarly to the counts of the Roman Empire). In 1487, a new expression appeared in a deed of armistice signed by King Matthias: the document mentioned 19 noble families as "natural barons in Hungary" (barones naturales in Hungaria) in contrast to the "barons of the realm" whose position was still linked to the high offices they happened to be holding. During the reign of King Vladislaus II, the special legal position of certain noble families was enacted and the act referred to their members as "barons" even if they were not holding any high offices at that time.

Although in the 16th century, the Tripartitum (a law book collecting the body of common laws that had arisen from customary practise) declared again that all the nobles enjoyed the same liberties independently of their offices, birth or wealth, but in practice, even it acknowledged that some differences had been existing within the nobility. Nevertheless, the Tripartitum still distinguished between the "true barons" (veri barones) who held the highest offices and the "barons only by name" (barones solo nomine) who did not hold any high offices but used noble titles. From 1526, the Habsburg kings rewarded their partisans with hereditary titles such as baron and count and the members of the families wearing such titles were invited to attend in person at the Diets. This customary practise was confirmed by legislation in 1608, when the Diet passed an act prescribing that the monarchs were to send a personal invitation to the members of the upper nobility (i.e., to the "true barons" and to the nobles authorized by the kings to use hereditary titles) when convoking the Diet; thenceforward, the prelates and the members of the upper nobility formed the Diets' Upper House.

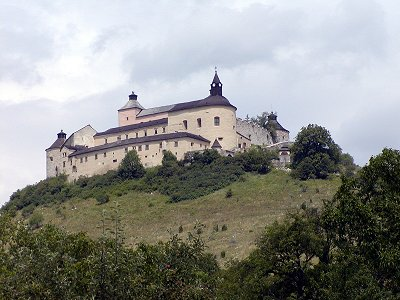
The Krasznahorka Castle (today Krásna Hôrka in Slovakia) - a seat of the Counts Andrássy

The Habsburg monarchs endeavoured to establish an "international" aristocracy within their empire and they granted several estates in the Kingdom of Hungary to their followers descending from their other realms and provinces; the Estates, however, managed to reserve the right that the kings could not grant offices and estates to foreigners without their authorization. From 1688, the members of the upper nobility were entitled by law to create an entail (fideicommissum) which ensured that their estates were inherited without division in contrast to the common law that prescribed that a noble's inheritance was to be divided equally among his heirs.

The "cardinal liberties" of the nobility were abolished by the "April laws" in 1848, but the members of the upper nobility could reserve their hereditary membership in the Upper House of the Parliament. In 1885, aristocrats who did not meet all the financial criteria set up by legislation, lost their seat in the legislative body. The Upper House was dissolved in 1918 and it was reorganized only in 1926, but thenceforward, the members of the upper nobility were only entitled to elect some representatives to the Upper House.

In 1945, the land reform liquidated the financial basis of the special status of the upper nobility. And finally, following the declaration of the Republic of Hungary, the Parliament passed an act that prohibited the use of noble titles in 1946.

== The tribal aristocracy (9th–11th centuries) ==
In the 9th century, the tribal federation of the nomadic Magyars (Hetumoger) was composed of seven (and later, after the Kabars had joined to it, of eight) tribes (Hungarian: törzs, Greek: phyle). The tribes were divided into 35-50 clans (Hungarian: nemzetség, Greek: genea). The Magyar clans must have been organized based on the real or fictitious kinship of their members; each of them had its own name (that may have been changing from time to time) and the clans possessed separate territories within the lands occupied by the tribe they were linked to. In the 9th-10th centuries, the kende, the gyula and the horka were the leaders of the Magyar tribal federation, while the tribes were headed by their own princes and each clan must have also had its own head.

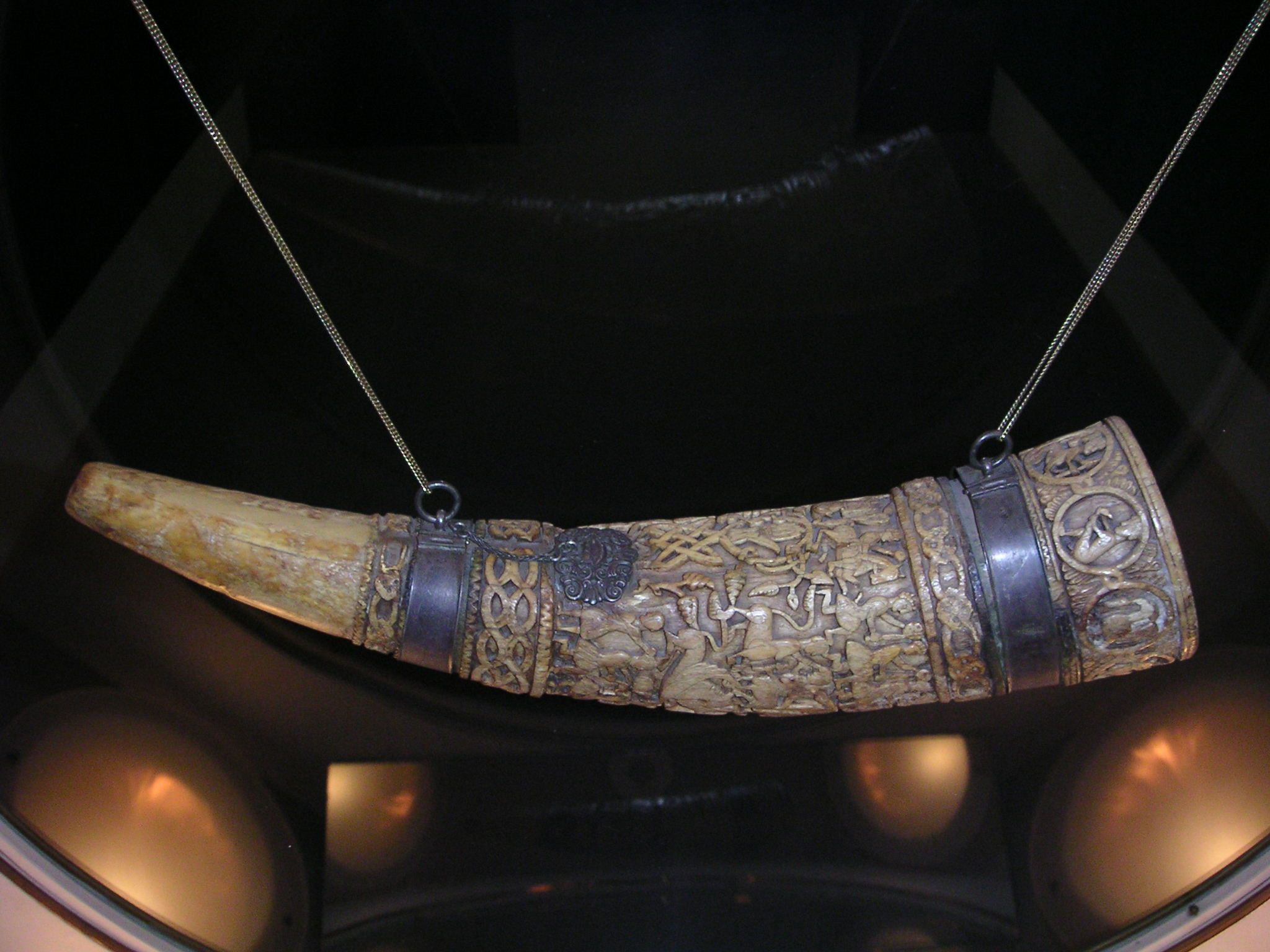
The "Horn of Lehel" - a horn traditionally connected to one of the leaders of the raids

The Byzantine emperor Constantine VII Porphyrogennetos recorded that

These eight clans /the eight tribes/ of the Turks /the Magyars/ do not obey their own particular princes, but have a joint agreement to fight together with all earnestness and zeal upon the rivers, wheresoever war breaks out.

— On Administering the Empire

Around 896, the Magyars invaded the Carpathian Basin and by 902, they occupied its whole territory. The Magyars made several raids to the territories of present-day Italy, Germany, France and Spain and also to the lands of the Byzantine Empire. The regular raids contributed to the differentiation of the tribal society because the leaders of the military actions were entitled to reserve a higher share of the booty for themselves. The military actions also contributed to the formation of the retinues of the heads of the tribes and the clans. The Magyars were obliged to stop their regular military actions westwards following their defeat at the Battle of Augsburg on the Lech River in 955; and in 970, the raids against the Byzantine Empire also finished.

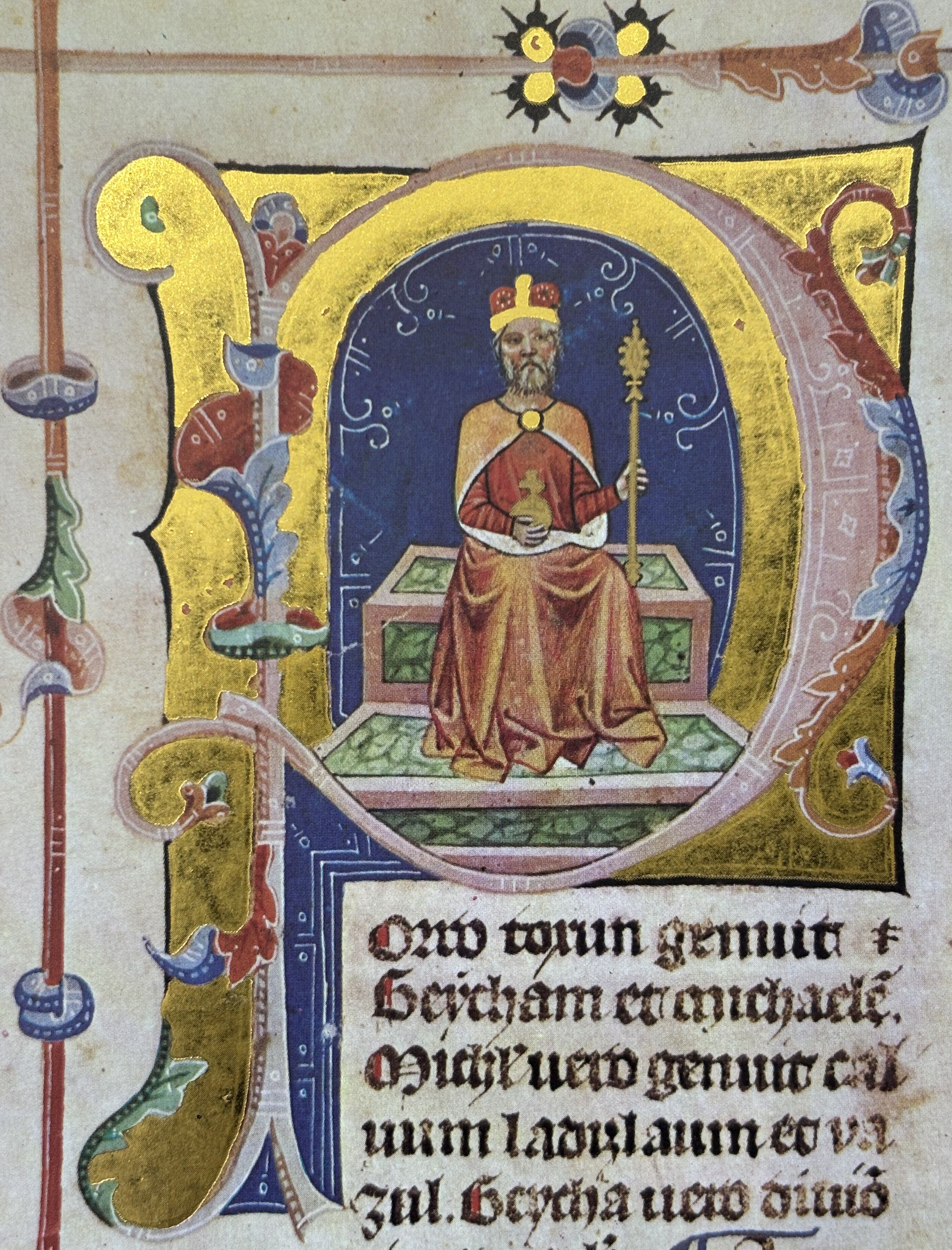
Grand Duke Géza (before 972-997)

When the period of the military raids closed, the organization of the future Kingdom of Hungary commenced during the reign of Grand Prince Géza (before 972-997) who united the western parts of the Carpathian Basin under his rule. The establishment of the Kingdom of Hungary is connected to King Saint Stephen (1000/1001-1038); he defeated the (semi-)independent Magyar tribal leaders who endeavoured to resist his rule and thus he managed to expand his authority over the whole territory of the Carpathian Basin by the 1030s. King Stephen I organized several "counties" that became the basic units of the royal administration. Some scholars claim that King Stephen I organized the "counties" on the basis of the territories possessed by the clans, but other authors pointed out that the relationship between the "counties" and the Magyar clans cannot be proven.

King Saint Stephen's acts ensured the private ownership of landed property; therefore, several families of the tribal aristocracy (i.e., the families of the heads of the tribes and clans) acquired the ownership of parts of the lands their clans had previously possessed. Consequently, several families of the future upper nobility descended from the tribal leaders who had surrendered to King Stephen I (e.g., the Aba and Csák families), and even the descendants of some rebellious tribal leaders (e.g., the kindred of Ajtony) could reserve a part of their ancestor's estates.

Although King Stephen I made a concerted effort to strengthen the position of Christianity in his kingdom and he adopted severe measures against the followers of pagan customs, but several Magyar tribal leaders (including the king's nephew Levente, who died as a pagan around 1046) did not give up their former lifestyle.

Vata, from the castle of Selus, was the first among the Hungarians who devoted himself to the Devil: following pagan customs, he shaved off his head and he wore his hair in three braids. Afterwards, much later, his son, called John, gathered plenty of magicians, witches and fortune-tellers following his father's example, and because of their incantation, he became favoured by the lords.

— Chronicon Pictum

On the other hand, the Christian missionaries' efforts were not in vain, and several members of the tribal aristocracy (e.g., Csanád, one of Ajtony's former military leaders) became an ardent advocate of the Christianity; and finally, all of them who could reserve their estates integrated into the upper stratum of the Christian society following the period of the internal wars in the 1040s.

Csanád spent the night restlessly, too; and he was praying to Saint George that he would induce the heavenly Lord to provide him assistance. And he took an oath that he would have a monastery built in his honour on the place of his prayer where he was kneeling on the soil if he triumphed over his enemy.

— The Major Legend of Bishop Saint Gerard

== The immigrant knights (10th-13th centuries) ==
The first knights from the western countries (mainly from the provinces of the Holy Roman Empire) arrived to Hungary during the reign of Grand Prince Géza in the 990s and he granted several estates to them on his domains. In 997, the future King Saint Stephen could gain a victory over Koppány (his relative who claimed the throne for himself after the death of Grand Prince Géza) with the assistance of the foreign knights serving in his German wife's retinues. The arrival of the immigrant (Hungarian: jövevény, Latin: advena) knights continued until the end of the 13th century; several of them (e.g., the brothers Hont and Pázmány) were invited by the monarchs who offered them estates in their kingdom; others arrived in the retinues of the queens of foreign origin; while some of them was obliged to leave their country and seek shelter in the kingdom.Most of the immigrant knights were horse-mounted men-at-arms thus the maintenance of their equipment required considerable financial resources that was ensured by grant of estates.

I have granted lands that are sufficient to set up two villages and also a forest called Sár in Karakó county to my guests, i.e., to the valiant knights Geoffrey and Albert who had left their country and their inherited estates upon my invitation and they came honestly to the Kingdom of Hungary, because they are noble men who deserve that we hasten to help them by royal generosity.

— A deed of King Géza I (1141-1162)

== Dignitaries and office-holders (11th-13th centuries) ==
=== The formation of the Royal Council ===
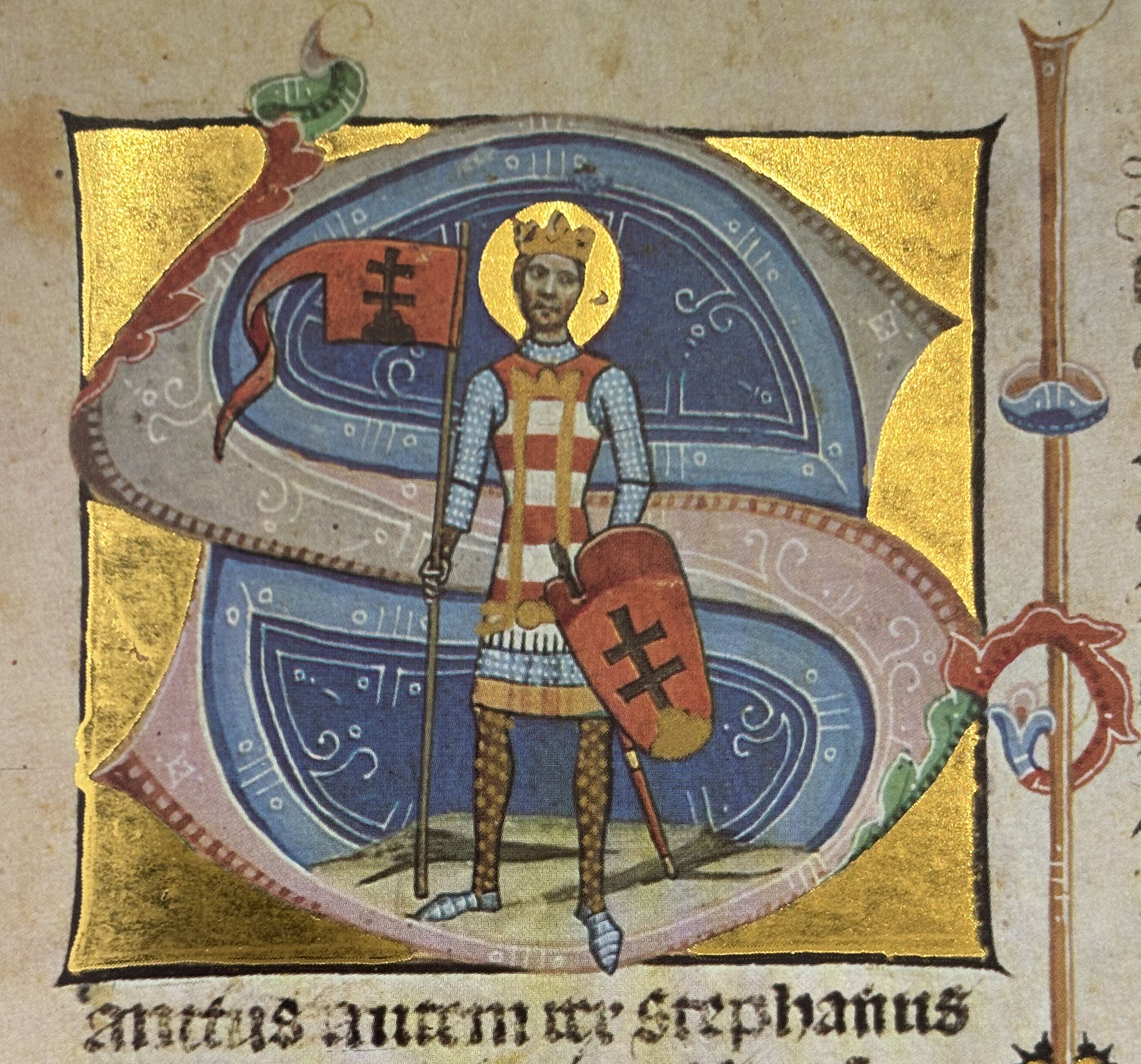
King Saint Stephen (1000/1001-1038)

The kings' (and their queens') retinues and the Royal Households became the centres where the merger of the tribal aristocracy and the immigrant knights occurred (mainly by inter-marriages) in the course of the 11-12th centuries.The decrees of King Stephen I contain clear references to the "men distinguished by birth and dignity" (Hungarian: születésre és méltóságra nézve nagyobbak, Latin: maiores natu et dignitate) who can be identified with the immigrant knights and the members of the tribal aristocracy who held the highest offices at his court and in the royal administration. They formed, together with the prelates, the Royal Council (Hungarian: királyi tanács, Latin: consilium regium) which became the highest forum of political decision-making in the kingdom.

The Council demands the seventh place by the kings' throne. It is the Council that turns kings into kings, it fixes the kings' limits, defends our realms, plans the wars, wins the victories, defeats the enemies, names the friends, builds up the states and demolishes the hostile camps. Since possibilities of great benefits are concealed beneath advices, they must not be ideas of stupid, demanding or average people, but it is required that senior councilors, who are braver and cleverer than average people and the honestest, form and perfect them.

— King Saint Stephen's Admonitions to His Son

Nevertheless, the monarchs remained the biggest landowners in the country until the end of the 12th century and the scattered lands owned even by the wealthiest members of the kings' retinues did not form contiguous geographical units in the kingdom. Based on their financial resources, the monarchs could reserve their overwhelming authority within their kingdom in the course of the 11-12th centuries: during the reign of King Géza II (1141–1162), the Bishop Otto of Freising recorded that all the Hungarians

are so obedient to the monarch that not only irritating him by open opposition but even offending him by concealed whispers would be considered for felony by them.

— Bishop Otto of Freising

=== The heads of counties ===
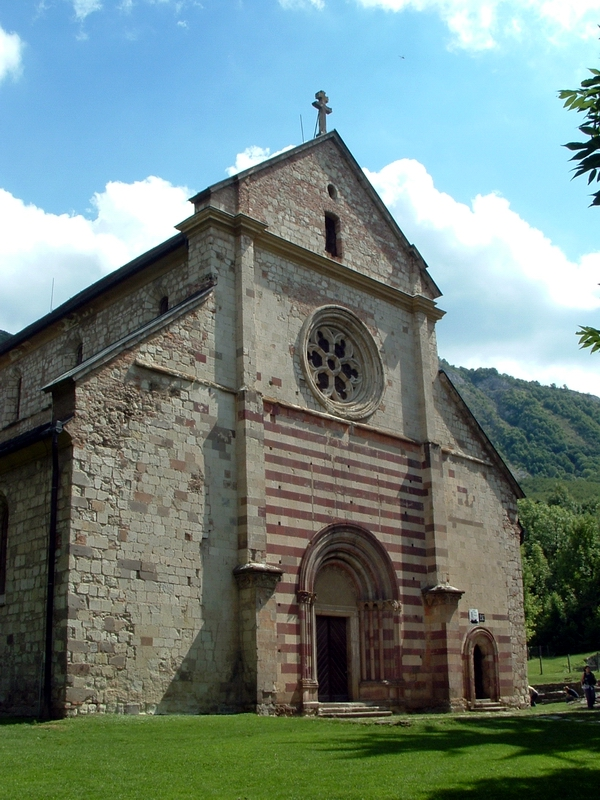
Cistercian monastery in Bélapátfalva - a "private monastery" built in the 13th century

Among the members of the monarchs' retinues, the heads of the counties (Hungarian: ispán, Latin: comes) enjoyed a distinguished position: they managed the royal revenues of the "counties" and they were entitled to one third of the revenues; moreover, they led their own retinues attached to their office. They enjoyed several privileges; e.g., in their cases, the judgement was to be passed by the monarchs in person.

The "ispáns" became the wealthiest and most powerful individuals in the country, but their appointment and dismissal depended exclusively upon the kings' favour and therefore, they could not form a hereditary aristocracy. Their financial conditions ensured that they could set up monasteries and grant possessions to them. These "private monasteries" not only served for burial place to the founder's family but their founder often reserved the "right of patronage" (Hungarian: kegyuraság, Latin: ius patronatus) for himself and for his descendants.

=== The high-officers of the realm and of the Royal Households ===
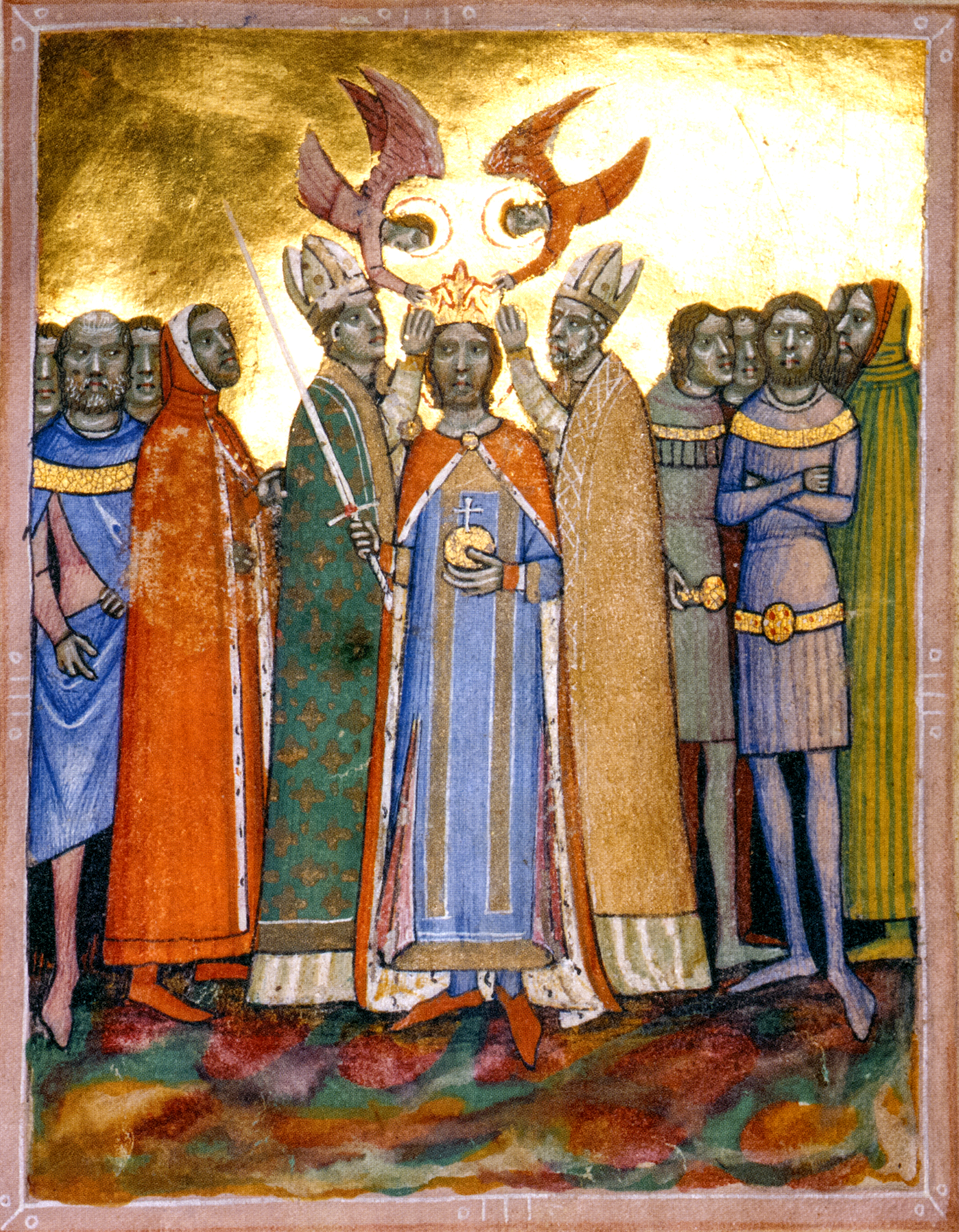
The coronation of King Saint Ladislaus (1077-1095)

The first references to an organized entourage around the monarchs were recorded during the reign of King Andrew I (1046–1060), but the development of the Royal Household (Hungarian: királyi udvar, Latin: aula regia) must have commenced earlier.The existence of a separate Household of the Queens was documented for the first time in the 1190s.

The gradual development of the Royal Households contributed to the establishment of a hierarchical structure within the nobility, because their high-officers held the highest positions within the kingdom. In practice, they not only fulfilled their duties within the Royal Households but also became heads of "counties", probably because no specific revenues were attached to their offices in the Royal Households.

The decrees of King Ladislaus I (1077–1095) referred to them as "notabilities" (Hungarian: előkelők, Latin: optimates) or "nobles" (Hungarian: nemesek, Latin: nobilis). From 1216, the royal charters began to use the expression "barons of the realm" (Hungarian: országbáró, Latin: baron regni) when referring to the dignitaries which prove that they wanted to distinguish themselves from other nobles (e.g., from the heads of counties). They, however, could not form a hereditary aristocracy, because their title was still linked to the offices they held and the monarchs had the power to dismiss them and to promote others at any time.

Some of the high-officers commenced to fulfil judiciary functions and thus they got rid of their administrative duties within the Royal Households. These high-judges and the governors of certain provinces (e.g., Transylvania, Croatia, Slavonia) formed together the high-officers of the realm who enjoyed a distinguished position within the nobility:

- the Palatine (Hungarian: nádor, Latin: regni Hungariæ palatinus) administered the Royal Household in the 11-12th centuries, but later, the Palatines held the highest judiciary position within the kingdom;
- the judge royal (Hungarian: országbíró, Latin: iudex curiæ regiæ) appeared in the documents around 1130, probably as the Palatine's deputy but later, the Judges of the Realm had their own sphere of jurisdiction;
- the office of the Voivode of Transylvania (Hungarian: erdélyi vajda, Latin: vayuoda Transsilvanus) developed from the office of the heads of Fehér county and its denomination was changing before the 13th century, but thenceforward, the voivodes governed Transylvania and they appointed the heads of the "counties" in the province;
- the Ban of Slavonia (Hungarian: szlavon bán, Latin: regni Sclavoniæ banus) was the governor of Slavonia from the 12th century;
- the Ban of Dalmatia and Croatia (Hungarian: dalmát-horvát bán, Latin: regnorum Dalmatiæ et Croatiæ banus) governed the two kingdoms occupied by the kings of Hungary at the beginning of the 12th century;
- the Ban of Macsó (Hungarian: macsói bán, Latin: banus Machoviensis) administered the territories of the Macsó (today Mačva in Serbia) region from the 1270s;
- the Ban of Szörény governed the territories attached to the Kingdom of Hungary around the Castle of Szörény (today Drobeta-Turnu Severin in Romania) in the 1220s;
- the master of the treasury (Hungarian: tárnokmester, Latin: magister tavernicorum) took over the financial functions of the Judge of the Realm in the 12th century but later, the tárnokmesters' own sphere of jurisdiction also developed.

The list of the high-officers of the Royal Households was developing gradually from the 11th century, and their functions also changed from time to time, but by the end of the 13th century, their hierarchy become consolidated:

- the Marshal (Hungarian: lovászmester, Latin: magister agazonum) was the head of the royal stablemen from the 11th century and later, he led the royal armies;
- the Master of the Cup-bearers (Hungarian: pohárnokmester, Latin: magister pincernarum) served wine at the kings' table and he administered the activities of the royal wine-growers;
- the Master of the Stewards (Hungarian: asztalnokmester, Latin: magister dapiferorum) served dishes at the monarch's table.
- the Master of huissiers (Hungarian: Ajtónállómester, Latin : magister janitorum)

== The emerging power of the feudal barons (13th century) ==
King Béla III (1172–1196) was the first monarch who alienated a whole county when he granted the ownership of all the royal estates in Modruš county to Bartolomej, who became the ancestor of the Frankopan (Hungarian: Frangepán) family. In his grant, the king stipulated that the Counts Frankopan would be obliged to arm some horse-mounted knights for the monarchs.

King Andrew II (1205–1235) radically changed the internal policy his predecessors had been following and he started to grant enormous domains to his partisans. He not only alienated castles and whole counties (i.e., the royal estates attached to them), but he also made "perpetual grants" (Hungarian: örökadomány, Latin: perpetua hereditas) that passed not only from fathers to sons (or in the lack of sons, to brothers or their sons) but all the male members of owner's family could inherit them. From the 1220s, several individuals commenced to refer to their clan in the official documents by using the expression de genere ("from the kindred of") following their name which suggests that the relevance even of distant kinship started to increase.

The king's new policy endangered the liberties of the royal servants owning landed property in the counties that the king had granted to his partisans. Therefore, in 1222, the royal servants led by former "barons of the realm" who had been dismissed by King Andrew II enforced the king to issue the Golden Bull in order to ensure their liberties. In the Golden Bull, the king also promised that he and his successors would not grant offices to foreigners without the consent of the Royal Council The first precedent when the nobles decided on a foreigner's reception into the nobility of the kingdom was set during reign the reign of King Andrew III (1290–1301), when in 1298, the assembly of the nobility authorized the king to grant an office in the royal administration to his uncle, the Venetian Albertino Morosini.

The last provision of the Golden Bull authorized the prelates and the "nobles" to resist any royal measures that could endanger their liberties confirmed by his decree.

Should it happen that we or any of the kings following us acted against these arrangements of us, this charter shall authorize both the bishops and the notabilities and nobles (both the ones who are present now and who would live later and also their descendants) to whenever resist and contradict universally or individually both to us and to the kings following us without suffering the ignominy of treachery.

— Section 2 of the Article 31 of the Golden Bull (Decree of 1222)

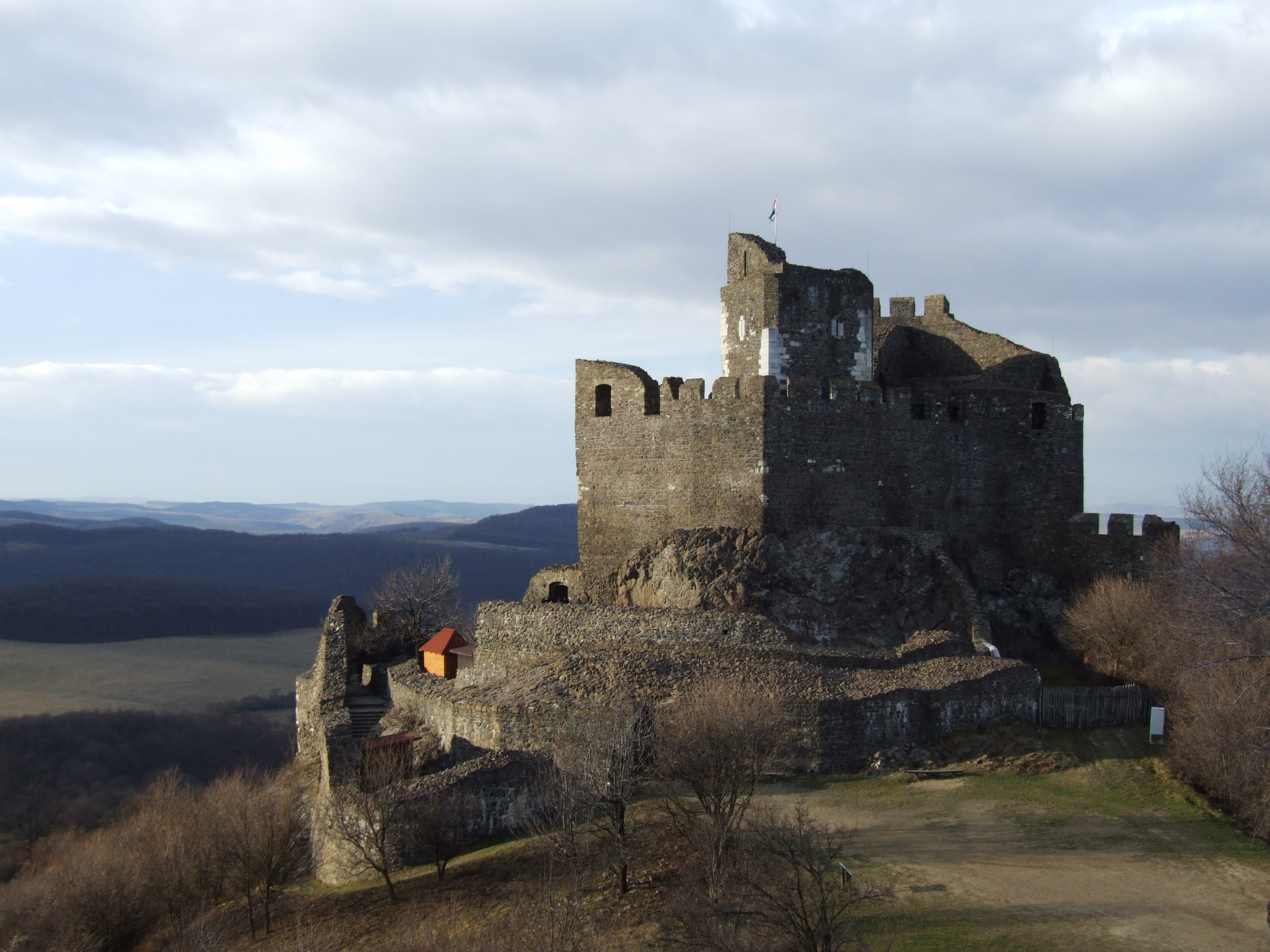
The Castle of Hollókő - a fortress of the Kacsics family built in the 13th century

Following the Mongol invasion of the kingdom in 1241-42, King Béla IV endeavoured the landowners to build strongholds in their domains and therefore, he often granted lands to his partisans and obliged them to have a fortress built there. As a consequence, at least 75% of the 162 fortresses built in the kingdom from 1242 until 1300 was erected on private estates. The maintenance of the fortresses required significant financial resources and therefore, the scattered character of landed property went under a radical change because the strongholds became the centres of bigger units of estates that consisted of the villages attached to them. The possession of one or more strongholds strengthened the position of the upper nobility, because the castle-owners could resist the monarchs for a longer period and they could also expand their influence over the owners of smaller estates around their castles. Based on their fortresses and retinues, the wealthier members of the landed nobility endeavoured to strengthen their own position and they often rebelled against the monarchs. They began to employ the members of the lesser nobility in their households and thus the latter (mentioned as familiaris in the deeds) became subordinate to them. A familiaris (servant) had to swear fidelity to his dominus (lord) and he fell under his lord's jurisdiction with regard to any cases connected to their special relationship. On the other hand, a familiaris reserved the ownership of his former estates and in this regard, he still fell under the jurisdiction of the royal courts of justice.

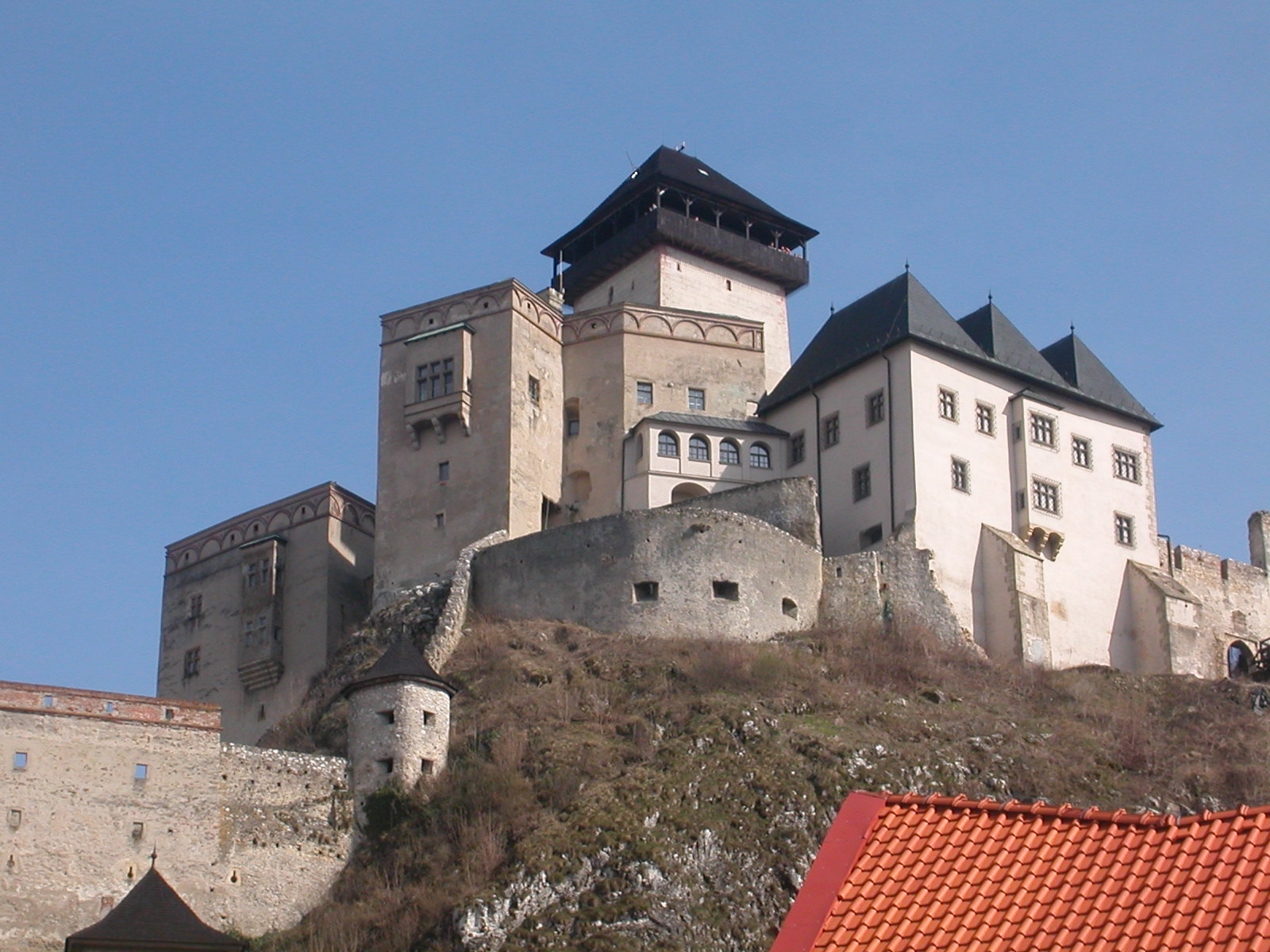
The Castle of Trencsén (today Trenčín in Slovakia) - the seat of Máté Csák III

From the 1290s, the most powerful barons commenced to govern their domains de facto independently of the monarchs and they usurped the royal prerogatives on the enormous territories possessed by them or by their familiaris. Following the death of King Andrew III, the largest part of the kingdom became subject to the de facto rule of oligarchs like Máté Csák III, Amade Aba and Ladislaus Kán who took advantage of the struggles among the claimants to the throne and expanded their supremacy to several counties. King Charles I Robert (1308–1342) had to spend the first decades of his reign in waging wars against the most powerful oligarchs and he could strengthen his position within the kingdom only by the 1320s.

== The age of chivalry (14th century) ==
The estates King Charles I Robert acquired by force from the rebellious oligarchs made him possible to introduce a new system in the royal administration: when he appointed his followers to an office, he also granted them the possession of one or more royal castles and the royal domains attached to them, but he reserved the ownership of the castle and its belongings for himself and thus his dignitaries could only enjoy the revenues of their possessions while they held the office. During his reign, the 20 dignitaries who held the highest offices in the royal administration or in the Royal Household obtained the honorific magnificus vir that distinguished them from other nobles.

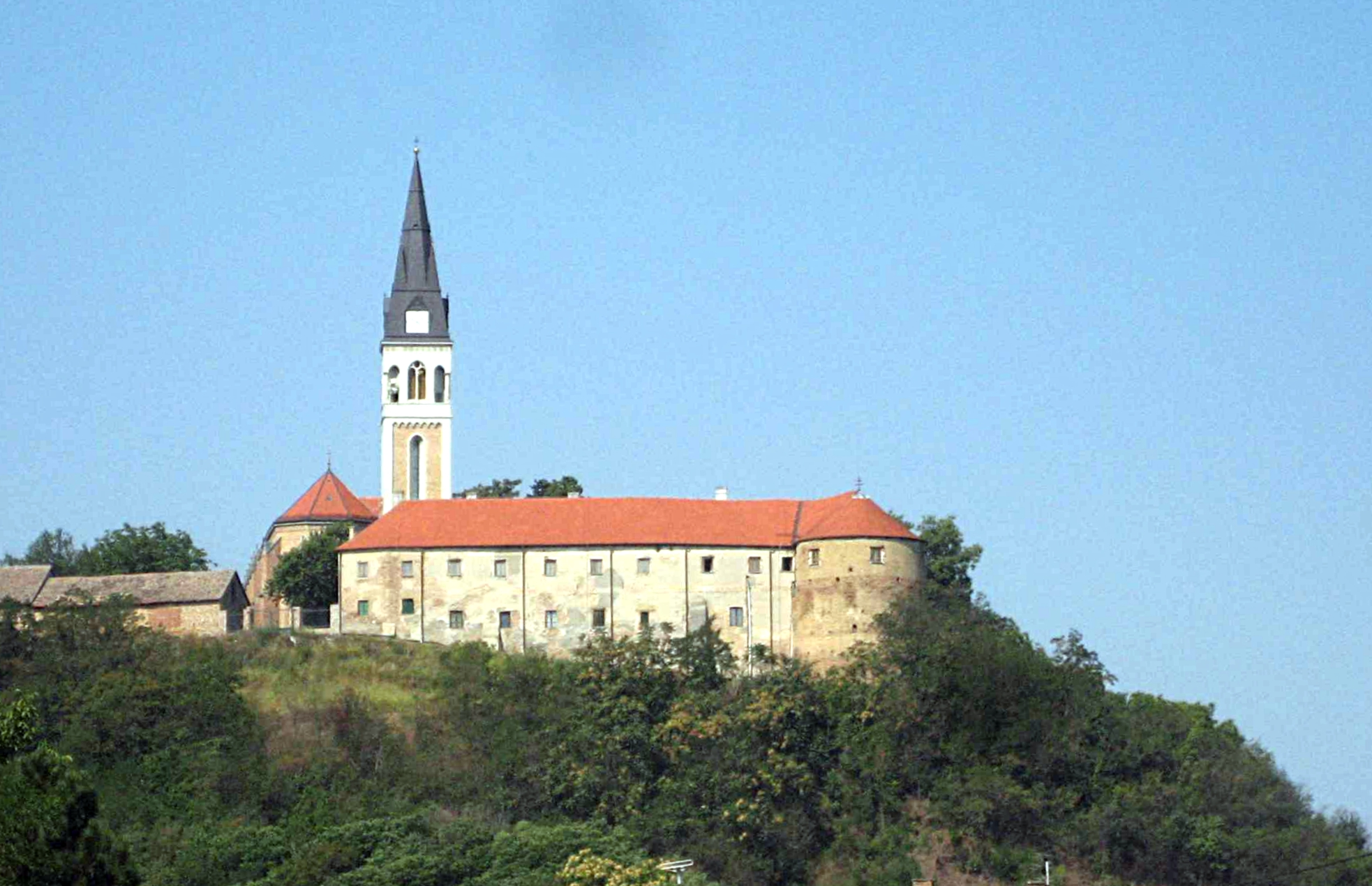
The Castle of Újlak (today Ilok in Croatia) - the seat of the Újlaki family

During his reign, members of new families attained the status of "barons of the realm"; some of the ancestors of the new families (e.g., that of the Drugeths) arrived from abroad and some of them were members of the lesser nobility (e.g., the ancestor of the Újlaki family), but the majority of the new families (e.g., the Garai, Szécsényi and Szécsi families) descended from clans whose members had already held high-offices in the 13th century

The king introduced a new royal prerogative in 1332 when he entitled Margaret de genere Nádasd to inherit her father's possessions in contradiction to the customs of the kingdom prescribing that daughters can inherit only one-fourth of their father's estates and the other parts of the estates should pass to his agnates. Thenceforward, the monarchs could strengthen the financial conditions of their followers by using the prerogative of "prefection" (Hungarian: fiusítás, Latin: præfectio) and thus entitling their wives to inherit their fathers' possessions. King Charles I Robert also set himself against the customs of the kingdom, when he granted landed property to his followers but he stipulated that the property could only be inherited by their descendants and thus he excluded their agnates from the inheritance.

King Charles I Robert endeavoured the implementation of the ideas of chivalry; in 1318, he established the Order of Saint George whose membership was limited to 50 knights. He also set up the body of "knights-at-the-court" (Hungarian: udvari lovag, Latin: aule regiæ miles) who acted as his personal delegates on an ad hoc basis. Thenceforward, most of the "barons of the realm" were appointed among the knights-at-the court. Before being knighted, children of the upper nobility could serve as pages (Hungarian: apród, Latin: parvulus) in the Royal Households, and when they grow up they became "juveniles-at-the court" (Hungarian: udvari ifjak, Latin: aule regiæ iuvenes). King Charles I Robert was the first king of Hungary who granted crests to his followers; the Hungarian word for coat-of-arms (címer) derives from the French expression for the crest (cimier).

In 1351, King Louis I (1342–1382) issued a new decree that modified the Golden Bull and introduced the entail system (Hungarian: ősiség, Latin: aviticitas) when regulating the inheritance of the nobles' estates; according to the new system, the nobles' real property could not be devised by will, but it passed by operation of law to the owner's heirs upon his death. During his reign, the members of the Bebek, Cudar and Lackfi families attained the status of "baron of the realm".

== The rule of the barons' leagues ==
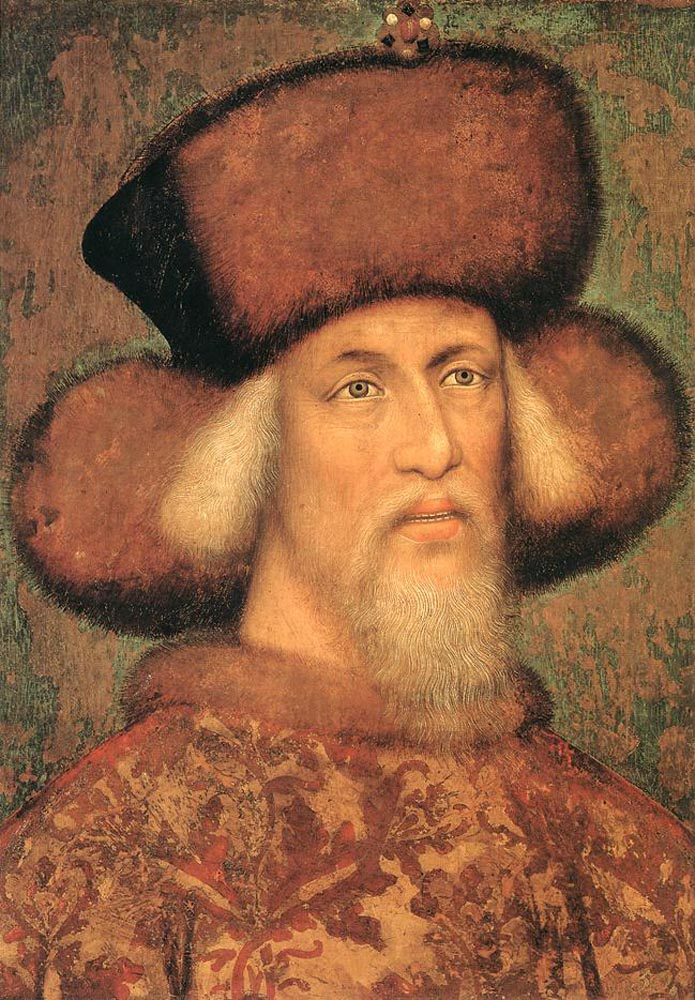
King Sigismund (1387-1437)

Following the death of King Louis I, his daughter Queen Mary I (1382–1385, 1386–1395) acceded to the throne, but the majority of the nobles opposed her rule. In 1385, the young queen had to abdicate in favor of her distant cousin, King Charles II (1385–1386), but her partisans murdered the new king soon and thus she could ascend the throne again. However, the followers of her murdered opponent's son, King Ladislaus of Naples rose up in open rebellion and captured her; thus the realm stayed without a monarch.

At that moment, the prelates and the "barons of the realm" set up a council; they have a seal prepared with the inscription "Seal of the People of the Kingdom of Hungary" (Latin: Sigillum regnicolarum regni Hungariæ) and issued decrees sealed by it in the name of the "prelates, barons, notabilities and all nobles of the realm". The members of the council entered into a contract with Queen Mary's fiancé and elected him king; in the contract, King Sigismund (1387–1437) accepted that his

councillors shall be the prelates, the barons, their offsprings and heirs, of those who used to be the councillors of the kings of Hungary

The contract also recorded that the king and his councillors would form a league and according to their contract, the king could not dismiss his councillors without the consent of the other members of the Royal Council. The contract suggests that the members of the Royal Council endeavored to strengthen the hereditary character of their position. The first league was led by the Palatine Stephen II Lackfi and the Archbishop John Kanizsai, but the latter could drive the former out of the power in 1397. However, King Sigismund favorized his councillors of foreign origin (e.g., his favourite was the Polish Stibor of Stiboricz) which resulted in his imprisonment, in 1401, by the discontent members of the Royal Council led by the Archbishop John Kanizsai, but he managed to conclude a new agreement with some members of the Royal Council who set him free.

Reconstruction of the insignia of the Order of the Dragon

The public law of the kingdom also started to differentiate the descendants of the "barons of the realm", even if they did not held any higher offices, from other nobles: the Act of 1397 referred to them as the "barons' sons" (Hungarian: bárófi, Latin: filii baronum) while later documents called them "magnates" (Hungarian: mágnás, Latin: magnates). From the 1430s, the "magnates" received the honorific magnificus, an expression that had earlier been used only when addressing the "barons of the realm".

During his reign, King Sigismund granted several royal castles and the royal domains attached to them to the members of the barons' leagues; by 1407, the number of royal castles decreased from 111 to 66. The king, however, wanted to strengthen his position and for this purpose, in 1408, he founded the Order of the Dragon, a chivalric order whose 22 members (e.g., the Palatine Nicholas II Garai, count Hermann II of Celje, Stibor of Stiboricz and the Despot Stefan Lazarević) swore fidelity to the king, his queen and their future children.

Some signs of the increasing self-consciousness of the "magnates" appeared in the 1420s. Some of them commenced to use names that referred to the high office their ancestors had held; e.g., the members of the Losonci family started to call themselves Bánfi meaning the "son of a Ban" in reference to their forefather who had been the Ban of Dalmatia and Croatia. Other magnates clearly referred to their descent from former "barons of the realm" in their deeds or used noble titles (such as "count" or "duke") abroad following the example of the western nobility although the public law of the kingdom did not accept their claim to distinctive titles.

When King Sigismund's son-in-law, Albert I (1437–1439) was proclaimed king, he had to take a solemn oath that he would exercise his prerogative powers only with the consent of the Royal Council. Following King Albert's death, a civil war broke out between the followers of his posthumous son, King Ladislaus V (1440–1457) and the partisans of his opponent, King Vladislaus I (1440–1444). Between 1440 and 1458, the Diet was convoked in each year (with the exception of 1443 and 1449) and it was involved in the legislative process of law-making: the bills were passed by the Diet before receiving the Royal Assent. When the monarch (or the regent) convoked the Diet, he sent a personal invitation to the prelates, "barons of the realm" and "magnates" and they attended in person at the assembly, while other nobles were usually represented by their deputies. Consequently, the Diets were dominated by the "magnates" not only because of their personal presence, but also because of the tendency that the counties elected their partisans as their own delegates.

In 1445, the Diet elected seven Captains General (Hungarian: főkapitány, Latin: generalis capitaneus) in order to govern the kingdom during the absence of King Vladislaus I (who actually had fallen in the Battle of Varna). In 1446, the assembly of the Estates proclaimed John Hunyadi to Regent and he was to govern the realm in cooperation with the Estates until 1453 when King Ladislaus V returned to the kingdom.

John Hunyadi was the first temporal "magnate" who received a hereditary title from a king of Hungary: in 1453, King Ladislaus V appointed him the hereditary head (Hungarian: örökös főispán, Latin: hæreditarius comes) of Beszterce county (now Bistriţa in Romania) and thus he became a count in the sense similar to the title's usage in the western countries. Although, some of the immigrant "magnates" had already used honorary titles before and they were often mentioned even in official documents with a reference to their title, but their title was granted by foreign monarchs and the public law in the Kingdom of Hungary did not recognize any special privileges connected to it.

== The legal separation of the hereditary aristocracy ==
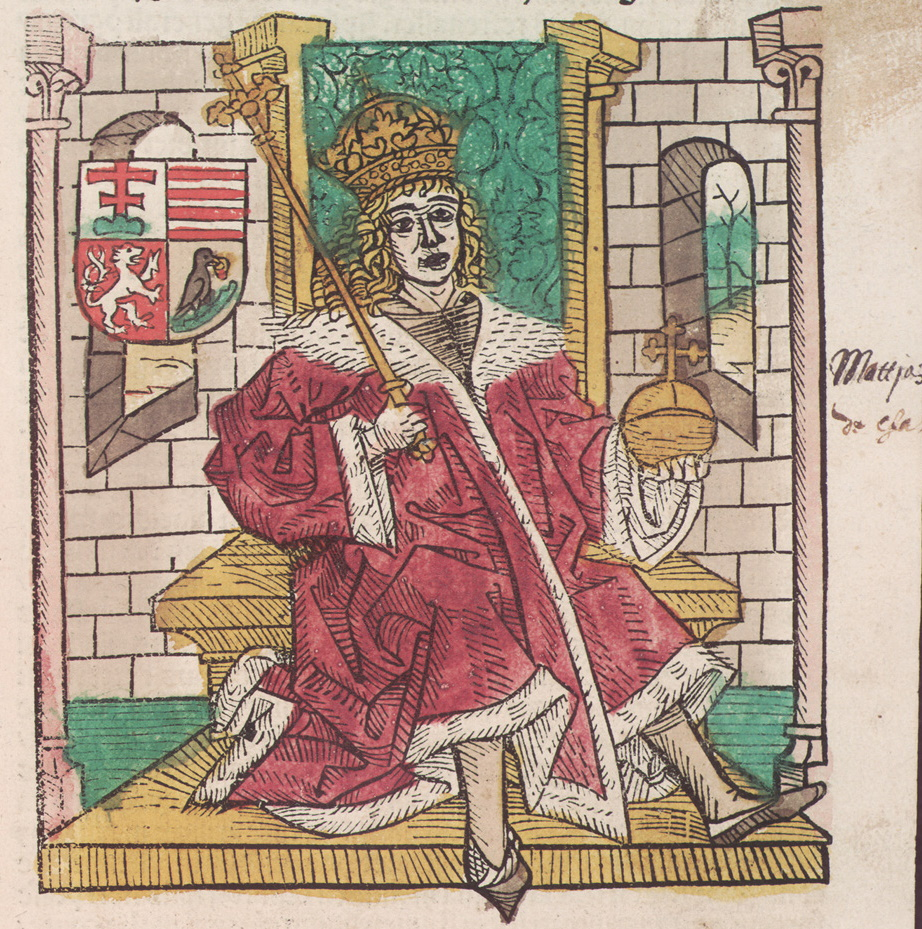
King Matthias I the Just (1458-1490)

John Hunyadi's son, Matthias I (1458–1490) was proclaimed king by the Estates, but he had to wage war against Frederick III, Holy Roman Emperor who claimed the throne for himself. Several magnates supported the emperor's claim and proclaimed him king against King Matthias; the emperor rewarded the brothers Sigismund and John of Szentgyörgy and Bazin with the hereditary noble title "count of the Holy Roman Empire" in 1459 and thus they became entitled to use red sealing wax. Although the Counts Szentgyörgyi commenced to use their title in their deeds, but in the Kingdom of Hungary, public law did not distinguish them from other nobles.

King Matthias I also rewarded his partisans with hereditary titles and appointed them hereditary heads of counties: John Vitovec became the hereditary head of Zagorje county in 1463; Emeric Szapolyai received the honor of Szepes county in 1465; in 1467, Nicholas Csupor de Monoszló and John Ernuszt were appointed to hereditary head of Verőce county and Turóc county respectively; in the 1480s, Nicholas Bánffy de Alsólendva and Peter and Matthias Geréb received such hereditary titles. The hereditary heads of counties were entitled, similarly to the "counts of the Holy Roman Empire", to use red sealing was. Moreover, during his reign, all the members of the wealthier families descending from the "barons of the realm" received the honorific magnificus which was a next step towards their separation from other nobles.

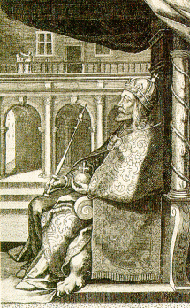
King Vladislaus II the "Dobže" (1490-1516)

In 1487, a new expression appeared in a deed of armistice signed by King Matthias: 18 families were referred to as "natural barons of Hungary" (Hungarian: Magyarország természetes bárói, Latin: barones natureles in Hungaria) in contrast to the "barons of the realm" who were still the holders of the highest offices in the public administration and the Royal Households. One of the 19 families (the Újlaki family) was styled "duke" in the deed, while other four families were styled "count" - the latter group included the Szentgyörgyi family which suggests that King Matthias accepted the title his opponent had granted to them.

During the reign of King Vladislaus II (1490–1516), the Diet unambiguously expressed that certain noble families were in a distinguished position and mentioned them as barons irrespectively of the office they held. The Diet prescribed that the barons were to arm soldiers pursuant to the number of the landed villeins who lived on their domains which prove that by that time, public law had acknowledged their special legal status and their privilege to use distinctive titles.

Moreover, there are lord barons, i.e., Duke Lawrence Újlaki and the Honourable Lords, Stephen Szapolyai (hereditary head of Szepes county, Palatine of the Kingdom of Hungary and the Judge of the Cumans), the Counts of Szentgyörgy and Basin, the Counts Frankopan and of Corbavia and Lord Peter Geréb de Vingárt (the Judge of His Majesty's Court) and other lord barons who are obliged (together with the above-mentioned lord prelates and officers of the realm) to struggle according to the number of their villeins.

— Article 22 of the Act of 1498

== Sources ==
- Bán, Péter (editor): Magyar Történelmi Fogalomtár; Gondolat, Budapest, 1989;
  ISBN 963-282-202-1.
- Benda, Kálmán (editor): Magyarország történeti kronológiája ("The Chronology of the History of Hungary"); Akadémiai Kiadó, Budapest, 1981; ISBN 963-05-2661-1.
- Engel, Pál - Kristó, Gyula - Kubinyi, András: Magyarország története - 1301-1526 (The History of Hungary - 1301-1526); Osiris Kiadó, 1998, Budapest; ISBN 963-379-171-5.
- Engel, Pál: Magyarország világi archontológiája (1301–1457) (The Temporal Archontology of Hungary (1301–1457)); História - MTA Történettudományi Intézete, 1996, Budapest; ISBN 963-8312-43-2.
- Fügedi, Erik: Ispánok, bárók, kiskirályok (Counts, Barons and Petty Kings); Magvető Könyvkiadó, 1986, Budapest; ISBN 963-14-0582-6.
- Kristó, Gyula (editor): Korai Magyar Történeti Lexikon - 9-14. század (Encyclopedia of the Early Hungarian History - 9-14th centuries); Akadémiai Kiadó, 1994, Budapest; ISBN 963-05-6722-9.
- Kristó, Gyula: Magyarország története - 895-1301 (The History of Hungary - 895-1301); Osiris Kiadó, 1998, Budapest; ISBN 963-379-442-0.
- Kristó, Gyula - Makk, Ferenc: Az Árpád-ház uralkodói (Rulers of the Árpád dynasty); I.P.C. KÖNYVEK Kft., 1996; ISBN 963-7930-97-3.
- László, Gyula: The Magyars - Their Life and Civilisation; Corvina, 1996; ISBN 963-13-4226-3.
- Markó, László: A magyar állam főméltóságai Szent Istvántól napjainkig - Életrajzi Lexikon (The High Officers of the Hungarian State from Saint Stephen to the Present Days - A Biographical Encyclopedia); Magyar Könyvklub, 2000, Budapest; ISBN 963-547-085-1.
- Mályusz, Elemér: Zsigmond király uralma Magyarországon (King Sigismund's reign in Hungary); Gondolat, 1984; ISBN 963-281-414-2.
- Tóth, Sándor László: Levediától a Kárpát-medencéig ("From Levedia to the Carpathian Basin"); Szegedi Középkorász Műhely, 1998, Szeged; ISBN 963-482-175-8.
