= Principality of Navahrudak =

State in Eastern Europe from the 1220s to 1390s

Principality of Navahrudak Навагрудскае княства (Belarusian)
- late 12th century–1390s
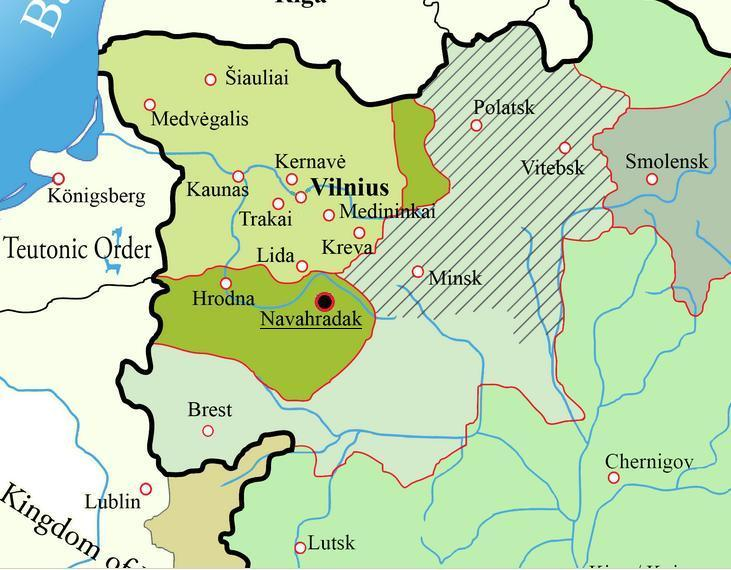
- Navahrudak in the 1260s, when it became part of the Grand Duchy of Lithuania and Ruthenia.
- Status: Appanage of Horoden within Kievan Rus'; (late 12th century–1220s): Autonomous/independent principality; (1220s–1260s): Disputed between the Grand Duchy of Lithuania and the Kingdom of Galicia–Volhynia; (1260s–1390s)
- Capital: Navahrudak
- Common languages: Old East Slavic, Ruthenian
- Religion: Eastern Orthodoxy
- Government: Principality
- Prince of Navahrudak
  - 1237: Iziaslav of Navahrudak
- Legislature: Veche
- History
  - Established: late 12th century
  - Secession from Horoden: 1220s
  - Mongol invasion of Kievan Rus': 1237–1240
  - Incorporation into Lithuania: 1390s
  - Disestablished: 1390s
Preceded by	Succeeded by
Kievan Rus' / Kievan Rus'	Grand Duchy of Lithuania
- Today part of: Belarus

The Principality of Navahrudak or Novogrudok (Note: Belarusian: Навагрудскае княства, romanized: Navahrudskaye knyastva. Ukrainian: Новогрудське князівство, romanized: Novohrudsjke knjazistvo.) was one of the appanage principalities of Black Ruthenia, emerging just before the end of Kievan Rus'. Its capital was Navahrudak, one of the centres of the region of Poniemnie or Panyamonne (in modern western Belarus). It was formed some time before the 1220s. For some time in the 13th and 14th centuries, it was the subject of struggle between the Gediminid Grand Duchy of Lithuania and the Romanovychi Kingdom of Galicia–Volhynia (Ruthenia). In the 1390s, the principality was abolished and incorporated into the Grand Duchy of Lithuania.

== History ==
=== Origins ===
The exact date of the foundation of the appanage of Navahrudak is unknown. Navahrudak was part of the appanage principality of Turaŭ-Pinsk, and later of the Principality of Volhynia (centred in Volodymyr). It became part of the Principality of Horoden (Goroden) around 1141. The first prince of Navahrudak was one of the sons (Boris/Barys or Gleb/Hleb) of prince Usevalad (Vsevolod) of Horoden, who died that year. The Boris and Gleb Church was built during their reign.

=== 13th century ===
Navahrudak emerged as a separate principality in the 1220s, seceding from the Principality of Horoden. In 1237, Prince Iziaslav of Navahrudak, who is considered a descendant of Usevalad of Horoden, is mentioned in the Galician–Volhynian Chronicle under the year 1237 (or 1236). This entry states that the King of Ruthenia, Danylo Romanovych sent the Lithuanians under Duke Mindaugas (Mindovg/Mendovg) and Prince Iziaslav of Navahrudak (Novhorod[ok]) against Duke Konrad (Kondrat) of Mazovia:

- "по том же лѣтѣ Данилъ же возведе на Кондрата Литвоу Минъдога Изѧслава Нов̑городьского."
- "А по тім році Данило-таки навів на Кондрата литву — [князя] Миндовга [та] Ізяслава [Микулича] Новгород[ок]ського."
- "The following year Danilo sent the Lithuanians, under [Prince] Mendovg, and [Prince] Izjaslav of Novgorod against Kondrat."

Based on this record, it is believed that Iziaslav of Navahrudak, who was in alliance or vassalage with Danylo Romanovych, took part in the struggle against the Mazovian duke together with Mindaugas.

In 1254, under an agreement between Vaišvilkas and King Danylo Romanovych, the Principality of Navahrudak was transferred to Prince Roman Danylovich. In 1268, during the war between the Kingdom of Ruthenia and the Grand Duchy of Lithuania, it was captured by the latter until 1280. For some time, Navahrudak was owned by Prince Skyrmunt (Скирмунт). From that time until the 1340s, the history of the principality is unknown. It was probably transferred as an appanage to younger sons or other representatives of the ruling dynasty of the Grand Duchy of Lithuania. There is a hypothesis that it belonged to the princely house of Alšėniškiai (Halshansky).

=== 14th century ===
Around the 1330s or 1340s (probably at the death of Gediminas in 1341), the Principality of Navahrudak was transferred to his son Karijotas, who reigned over it until c. 1360.

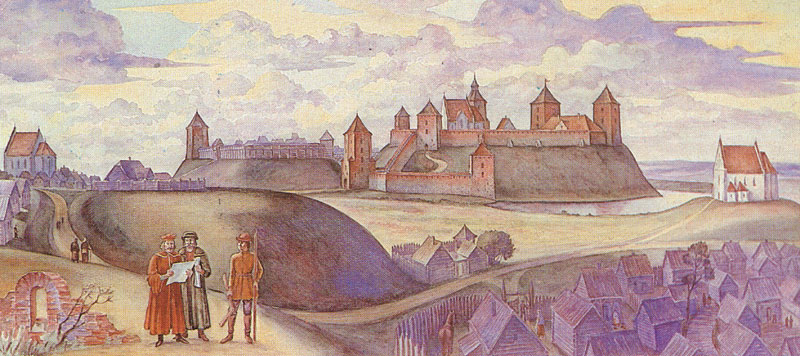
Modern reconstruction of Navahrudak Castle

As early as 1352, there are mentions of activities of the sons of Karijotas in Volhynia. The Tale about Podolia narrates in detail how they conquered Podolia in the 1350s and 1360s. The Karijotas sons thus used Navahrudak as their base for expansion into what is now Western Ukraine. One of the motives seems to have been that their clan was growing too large to properly divide Navahrudak into ever smaller pieces. Thus, it seems that in the late 1350s or 1360s, the sons of Karijotas moved into Volhynia and Podolia, and out of Navahrudak, where the sons of Kęstutis (Keystut; Duke of Trakai) moved in.

Karijotas' date of death is uncertain; he is last mentioned in writing in the 1358 treaty between the dukes of Mazovia and Kęstutis and his brothers, but not anymore in 1366, where that would have been expected. It is therefore likely that Karijotas died between 1358 and 1366. An undated document provides for the division of Navahrudak between Vaidotas (Voydat) and Tautvilas, sons of Kęstutis, probably between 1358 and 1362. The reason is that Vaidotas was captured by the Teutonic Knights in his unsuccessful defence of Kaunas Castle in 1362. Nicolas Jorga identified a "captured pagan king from Lecto[nia]" (most probably meaning "Lithuania") who according to the Eulogium historiarum sive temporis visited the English royal court in London in 1363, as this Vaidotas Kęstutaitis. It is therefore neither likely nor necessary that he ever returned to Lithuania.

The Principality of Navahrudak (21.) in the year 1385, just before its abolition

Karijotas' son Theodor, Prince of Podolia, was also a prince of Navahrudak. After the death of Prince Yuri Voydatovich in the 1390s, the Principality of Navahrudak was abolished, and its lands were incorporated into the Grand Duchy of Lithuania and Ruthenia, where the Grand Duke's governors were appointed. Another son of Vaidotas (Voydat), Ivan, became the founder of the Principality of Kroshen.

== List of princes ==
- Iziaslav of Navahrudak (fl. 1237), grandson of Vsevolod of Horoden, in 1237
- Mindaugas, 1240s-1253
- Vaišvilkas, 1253–1254 (first time)
- Roman Danylovich, 1254–1258
- Vaišvilkas, 1258–1259 (second time)
- Karijotas, 1341 – c. 1358~62
- divided between Vaidotas and Tautvilas, sons of Kęstutis, probably between 1358 and 1362

== Bibliography ==
=== Primary sources ===
- Galician–Volhynian Chronicle (c. 1292)
  - * Shakhmatov, Aleksey Aleksandrovich, ed. (1908). Галицко-Волынскій сводъ [The Galician–Volhynian Codex]. Complete Collection of Russian Chronicles (PSRL) (in Church Slavic). Vol. 2 (3rd ed.). Saint Petersburg: Typography of M. A. Aleksandrov / Izbornyk. pp. 715–938. – critical edition of the Hypatian Codex.
  - Perfecky, George A. (1973). The Hypatian Codex Part Two: The Galician–Volynian Chronicle. An annotated translation by George A. Perfecky (PDF). Munich: Wilhelm Fink Verlag. OCLC 902306.
  - Makhnovets, Leonid (1989). Літопис Руський за Іпатським списком : Галицько-Волинський літопис [Rus' Chronicle according to the Hypatian Codex : Galician–Volhynian Chronicle] (in Ukrainian). Kyiv: Dnipro. p. 591. ISBN 5-308-00052-2. — A modern annotated Ukrainian translation of the Galician–Volhynian Chronicle, based on the Hypatian Codex with comments from the Khlebnikov Codex.

=== Literature ===
- Jankauskas, Vytas (6 November 2024). "Naujos žinios apie kunigaikštį Vaidotą Kęstutaitį 1363 metais / New Data on Duke Vaidotas Kęstutaitis in 1363" [Нові дані про герцога Вайдотаса Кєстутаїтіса в 1363 році]. Lituanistica. 70 (3). doi:10.6001/lituanistica.2024.70.3.2. ISSN 2424-4716.
- Raffensperger, Christian; Ostrowski, Donald (2023). The Ruling Families of Rus: Clan, Family and Kingdom. London: Reaktion Books. p. 309. ISBN 978-1-78914-745-2. (e-book)
- Slipushko, Oksana (2022). "Lietuvos ir Rusios kronikos mąstymo paradigma vėlyvaisiais viduramžiais / Lithuanian-Ruthenian Chronicle Paradigm of Thinking in the Late Middle Ages". LOGOS. 113: 18–25. doi:10.24101/logos.2022.69.
- Voytovych, L.V., Удільні князівства Рюриковичів і Гедиміновичів у XII—XVI ст. історико-генеалогічне дослідження. [The appanage principalities of the Rurikids and Gediminids in the 12th–16th centuries: a historical and genealogical study]. (Lviv 1996). pp. 83, 111, 193. (in Ukrainian).
- Vitsko, Dzmitry (26 February 2019). "Historical cartography in Belarus (studies on the administrative division, borders and population of the Grand Duchy of Lithuania)". Studia Geohistorica (6): 110. doi:10.12775/SG.2018.08. ISSN 2300-2875.
