= Karijotas =

Duke of Navahrudak and Vawkavysk

Karijotas or Koriat (baptized Michal; died between 1358 and 1363) was the duke of Navahrudak (since 1341) and Vawkavysk. A member of the House of Gediminas, he was one of the sons of Gediminas, the grand duke of Lithuania.

== Life ==
According to Polish historian Jan Tęgowski, he was born probably between 1305 and 1308. He was baptized before 1349.

In 1349, Algirdas sent him along with two sons, Aikštas or Eikšis from Eišiškės and Simeon from Svislach, to Jani Beg, Khan of the Golden Horde, to negotiate an alliance against the Teutonic Knights and the rising northeastern Rus' principality of Moscow. However, Jani Beg handed Karijotas over to Simeon of Moscow for a ransom.

Karijotas' date of death is uncertain; he is last mentioned in writing in the 1358 treaty between the dukes of Mazovia and Kestutitis and his brothers, but not anymore in 1366, where that would have been expected. It is therefore likely that Karijotas died between 1358 and 1366. An undated document provides for the division of Navahrudak between Vaidotas and Tautvilas, sons of Kęstutis, probably between 1358 and 1362. The reason is that Vaidotas was captured by the Teutonic Knights in his unsuccessful defence of Kaunas Castle in 1362. It is also unlikely that Vaidotas ever returned to Lithuania after 1362, or that he inherited lands in Navahrudak before Karijotas' death; therefore Karijotas likely died in or before 1362.

== Family ==
It is unclear how many children Karijotas had. The number varies between 4 and 10. Reliable data is available about four: Aleksander, George, Konstantin, and Fedir, who helped Algirdas, the grand duke of Lithuania, to defeat the Tatars in the Battle of Blue Waters in 1363. In return, they received Podolia. Aleksander (died c. 1380) was involved in the Galicia–Volhynia Wars between his uncle Liubartas and Casimir III of Poland. In 1366, Aleksander received Volodymyr in Volhynia from Casimir for his service against his uncle. Only four years later, after Casimir's death, Liubartas recaptured the city. George (died in 1375 in Moldavia) at first assisted Aleksander, but was poisoned soon after accepting an invitation to become the ruler of Moldavia. Kostantin, after the Union of Krewo in 1385, moved to Hungary and died there around 1389. Fedir (d. 1414) inherited Navahrudak from his father and after other brothers were dead around 1389, became ruler of all Podolia. In 1392, he disobeyed Vytautas the Great and had to run to Hungary, where he ruled Mukachevo and built Palanok Castle. Dmitri Bobrok is also frequently listed as one of Koriat's sons.

== See also ==
- Family of Gediminas – family tree of Karijotas
- Gediminids

== Literature ==
- Jankauskas, Vytas (6 November 2024). "Naujos žinios apie kunigaikštį Vaidotą Kęstutaitį 1363 metais / New Data on Duke Vaidotas Kęstutaitis in 1363" [Нові дані про герцога Вайдотаса Кєстутаїтіса в 1363 році]. Lituanistica. 70 (3). doi:10.6001/lituanistica.2024.70.3.2. ISSN 2424-4716.
- Tęgowski, Jan (1999). Pierwsze pokolenia Giedyminowiczów (in Polish). Poznań-Wrocław: Wydawnictwo Historyczne. ISBN 8391356310.
