= Palanok Castle =

10th-century castle in Mukachevo, Ukraine

Coordinates: 48.431507°N 22.687798°E

Palanok Castle, Munkács Castle
- Mukachevo, Zakarpattia Oblast, Ukraine
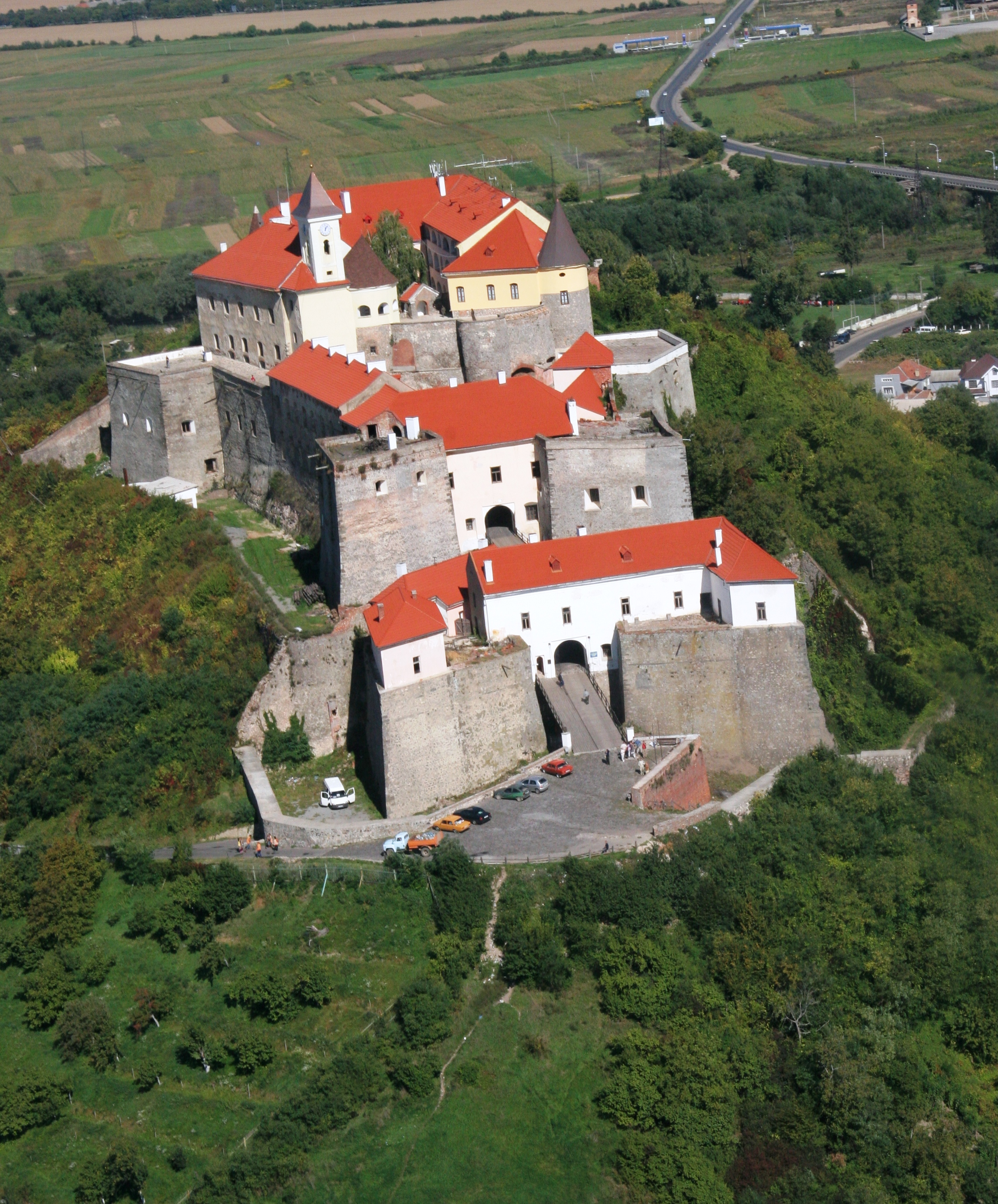
- The Palanok Castle

Site information
- Type: Castle
- Condition: Survives in good condition; some parts in disrepair.

Site history
- Built: 10th century

The Palanok Castle or Mukachevo Castle (Ukrainian: Замок "Паланок", romanized: Zamok "Palanok"; Hungarian: Munkács vára or Munkácsi vár; German: Plankenburg) is a historic castle in the city of Mukachevo in the western Ukrainian oblast (province) of Zakarpattia. The Palanok Castle is delicately preserved, and is located on a 68-metre-high (223 ft) former volcanic hill. The castle complex consists of three parts: the high, middle, and low castle.

== History ==
=== From its foundation until 1541 ===
There is no accurate data on the circumstances of the construction of the castle. Archaeological research shows that the area was already inhabited in the Neolithic era, and that in the Bronze and Iron Ages there was a fortress on the site of today's castle. At the time of the conquest, a fortress built likely from wood piles and/or stilts, stood at the top of today's castle hill.

- St. Stephen attributed special importance to the castle, strengthened his walls, and King Ladislaus continued his work and built a stone wall.
- Anonymus, Béla III of Hungary's clerk, author of the Gesta Hungarorum (The Deeds of the Hungarians) mentions that when the seven leaders and their tribes were crossing the Verecke Pass and the mountains below it, they became very tired and determined to rest at this place. As the countryside was at great cost (work), the settlement was called Munkács. According to another legend, the name of the castle and the city stems from the Slavic word for "suffering", because the construction of the castle and the application of the stones to it required much work and suffering.
- In 1086 Munkács was attacked by the Pechenegs; they besieged the castle for five days, but were unable to capture it.
- The rapid development of the city concluded during the reign of Béla III of Hungary. In 1190, for example, the Tatars scattered the villages of the county of Bereg and Ung.
- In 1241, the 60,000 strong army of Batu Khan entered Hungary through the Verecke Pass. The city was demolished, but the castle was not occupied.
- After the retreat of the Tatars, in 1242 Béla IV of Hungary gave instructions to build new castles, to reinforce existing ones. During the 13th century, Munkács Castle became one of the largest and best protected fortresses in Hungary.
- Charles Robert appreciated his significance to the ever-stronger Poland and Ruthenia, and therefore he took possession of Italian masters to reconstruct and strengthen. Louis I of Hungary (1342-1382) continued his construction.
- In 1352 another Tatar army arrived under the castle, but his garrison not only resisted his attack, but broke out from behind the walls, wrecking the enemy, captivating and executing Atlamos Khan.
- Tódor Korjatovics, Prince of Podolsky, played a significant role in the history of the castle, and he was associated with relatives in the royal court of Hungary. In 1396, King Sigismund donated the castle and the associated domination to him.

Together with his courtyard he moved to the Munkács region, and with his activities he greatly promoted the economic and cultural development of Transcarpathia. He set up his court in the castle of Munkács, extending it considerably. At his feet, a wide ditch was dug and filled with water; The other name of the castle is "Palánk". After the deaths of Tatjana Korjatovics and his wife, Munkács often changed ownership. The strategically important fortress has played a prominent role in the region between 15th and 17th century.

From 1423, the castle was owned by György Brankovics. From 1439 László Palóczy, and in 1445 the governor of Hungary János Hunyadi became the owner of the castle. After his death, in 1456, his widow, Erzsébet Szilágyi became the mistress of the castle. Later it was owned by King Matthias and then by János Corvin. The people of Munkács actively participated in the peasant rebellion of György Dózsa in 1514. The rebels seized the castles of Munkács, Huszt and Királyháza. In 1514, Munkács Castle and its domination became the property of the Hungarian crown and became the owner of the king. The castle suffered severe damage during the peasant war. King Louis II (1516–1526) started to rebuild it. In 1527 the castle was still in King Louis II's widow Queen Mary's ownership, when János Szapolyai occupied it in 1528. After a year he exchanged it with other castles in Palatine István Báthori's property. István Báthory built the ring-shaped bastion of the upper castle and a 14-metre-high (46 ft) observation tower. In 1537 King Ferdinand I besieged and then occupied the castle.

=== History of the Turkish era ===
After 1541, the castle became the property of the son of János Szapolyai, János Zsigmond, but in reality he was ruled by his mother, Queen Isabella. The castle became the property of the 19 year old János Zsigmond only after the death of Isabella, who owned it until 1567. In 1560 Emperor Ferdinand I donated the castle to István Dobó, but since it was in the hands of the enemy, Dobó could not take over the donation. In 1567 imperial troops occupied the castle. In 1573 Maximilian II pledged it to Gábor Mágócsi. At that time Zsigmond Rákóczi was married into the Magócsi family, and the castle was later acquired by the Rákóczi family. In 1611 it became the property of Miklós Eszterházy.

In 1625 Gábor Bethlen, the Prince of Transylvania, bought the castle and its domination for 300,000 forints. At this time, the castle captain, János Balling, repaired the castle and erected a new building in the middle yard. In 1857, when the castle was converted into a prison.

The castle then had 14 bastions and a new building in the middle courtyard. In the upper part was the castle palace, which was led by a stone staircase.

After the death of Gábor Bethlen in 1629, the castle was owned by his wife, Katalin of Brandenburg, who was forced to hand it over to György Rákóczi I, Prince of Transylvania, a few months later. According to the law of inheritance, after Katalin's death the castle should have become the property of the royal House of Habsburg, but György Rákóczi I did everything he could to obtain this strategically important fortress. János Balling, the captain of the castle, was very helpful in this, and he did not let the royal ambassadors enter the castle. So the castle of Munkács came into the possession of the Rákóczi family, and this was the beginning of the most glorious period of its history. Thus in 1635 the castle and its estates became the property of György Rákóczi I. The prince arranged his court here and welcomed the French, Polish and Swedish ambassadors he had successfully invited to negotiate with them. After his death, his wife Zsuzsanna Lorántffy obtained possession of the castle, and continued to expand and strengthen it, using the expertise of French architects. A floor was built on the southern building of the central courtyard, to which Rákóczi square was added.

After the death of Zsuzsanna, her son György Rákóczi II became the lord of the castle. Between 1649 and 1656, he welcomed, among others, the delegations of Bohdan Khmelnytsky of the Zaporozhian Cossacks, with whom he negotiated joint action against Poland. In 1657, despite the protest of the Turkish Sultan, he entered war against Poland, which ended with the defeat of his troops. The Poles, led by Prince Lubomirsky, sacked the counties of Bereg, Ung and Zemplén in revenge, destroyed the cities, including Munkács and Beregszász, but could not occupy the castle. After the death of György Rákóczi II, his wife Zsófia Báthory and his son Ferenc I Rákóczi moved into the castle. Ferenc Rákóczi I married Ilona Zrínyi, daughter of the Croatian-born Péter Zrínyi Ban of Croatia. Their son was Ferenc II Rákóczi, one of the most outstanding figures in Hungarian history. After the death of Ferenc I Rákóczi, Ilona Zrínyi remained widowed with her two children, Ferenc and Julianna. Imre Thököly and Ilona Zrínyi were married in 1682 in the Castle of Munkács. Imre Thököly had the castle repaired, strengthened its walls and shrines, and held a rich courtyard. After Thököly was captured by the Turks, Ilona Zrínyi remained with her two children in the castle. The advancing imperial troops easily captured the Castle of Ungvár and arrived at Munkács in the middle of November 1685.

On March 10, 1686, Imperial General Aeneas de Caprara (1631–1701) called for surrender, but Ilona Zrínyi stood firm. For seven months she defended the castle with his Hungarian, Ruthenian, Slovak and German soldiers. Showing her personal heroism, she often appeared on the bastions with her ten-year-old son Francis, defying the strong gunfire. Her daughter Julianna took care of the wounded.

In April 1686, General Caprara was forced to abandon the siege. His soldiers robbed the town of Munkács in revenge and retreated to Kassa. During the siege, 24 defenders of the castle died, but the losses of the Austrians were many times higher.

In 1687, General Caprara besieged the castle again, with more than 3,000 troops. On November 2, 1687, Ilona Zrínyi again refused to surrender. For one year the Austrian besieged the castle, but without success. At the end of 1687, however, the position of the defenders became critical. This castle was the only one in Hungary that the Austrians could not capture. However, the enemy did not give up the hope of acquiring a strategically very important fortress and bringing together new forces under the castle.

Finally, Ilona Zrínyi was forced to negotiate with the besiegers to give up the castle. She signed the agreement on January 15, 1688, and two days later, Emperor Leopold I's army, led by Antonio de Caraffa entered the castle. Ilona Zrínyi was taken to Vienna and confined to a monastery, and her children were assigned to an Austrian Lyceum.

Leopold I gave instructions to strengthen the castle, and as a result it became an invincible fortress.

=== Role at the Rákóczi War of Independence ===
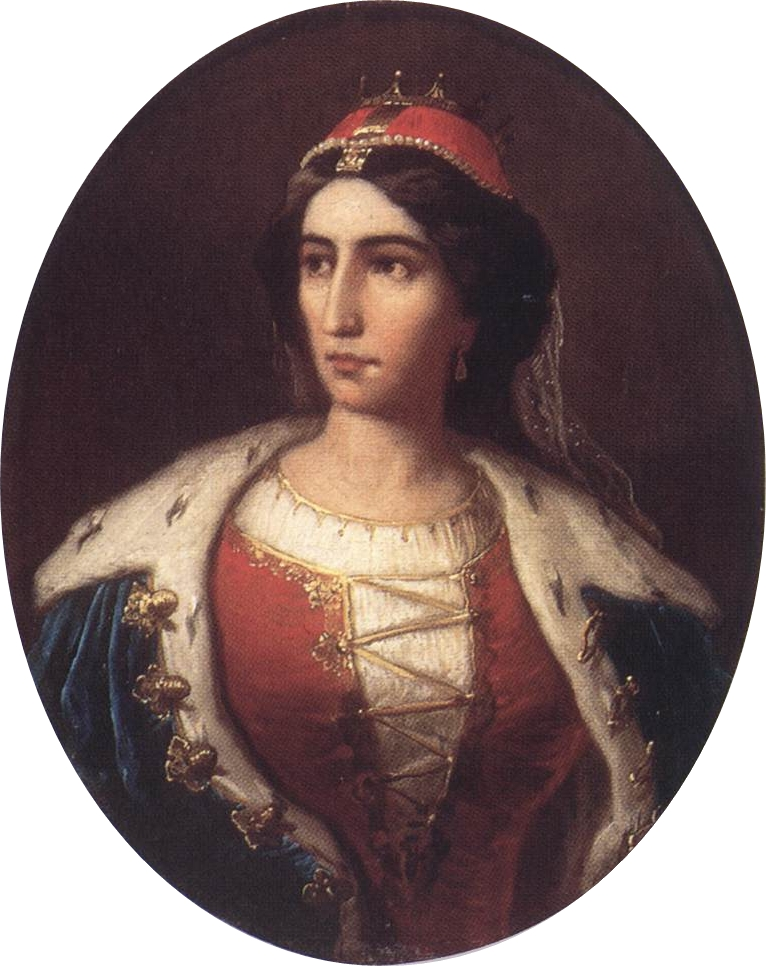
Ilona Zrínyi, as painted by Károly Jakobey. Countess Ilona Zrínyi (1643, Ozalj – 18 February 1703, Izmit) was a noblewoman and heroine. She was one of the last surviving members of the Croatian-Hungarian Zrínyi noble family. She was the daughter of Petar Zrinski, Ban (viceroy) of Croatia, the niece of both Miklós Zrínyi and Fran Krsto Frankopan and the wife of Francis Rákóczi I and Imre Thököly, as well as the mother of Francis Rákóczi II. She is remembered in history for her Defense of Palanok Castle against the Imperial army in 1685-1688, an act for which she was regarded a heroine in Hungary.

Munkács Castle played an important role in Ferenc II Rákóczi's War of Independence. On 16 June 1703, the prince travelled from Poland to Hungary via the Verecke Pass. His troops occupied Munkács on June 24, 1703, but they were unable to occupy the castle at that time, although the Rusyns around Munkács persistently helped. The siege of the castle began in November 1703 and ended on February 16, 1704 with the victory of the Kuruc army. Rákóczi immediately moved in and headed for a freedom fight, which was a very important base for his strategic position. He therefore instructed Demoiseaux brigade engineer to prepare a plan for the modernization and reconstruction of the castle. In 1705 he began to strengthen the castle. Most of the work was carried out by Bereg County Hungarian and Ruthenian serfs; it continued until 1710. The construction was first supervised by Colonel De La Mothe, and from 1708, De la Faux was taken over. Next to the castle, the mill on the left bank of the Latorca was converted into a mint in 1706, which operated until 1713. Ferenc II Rákóczi received several foreign delegations in the fortress of Munkács, among them the delegates of Russian tsar Peter the Great. The Kuruc ended the war of freedom in defeat. On June 22, 1711, the defenders of the castle put down the gun. The Austrians were ruthlessly vindicated by the insurgents, and dozens of Ruthenian and Hungarian villages were destroyed in the vicinity of the castle, which had lost its strategic importance.

=== 18th and 19th centuries ===
After the failure of the War of Independence led by Rákóczi, the castle of Munkács fell into the possession of Charles VI, Holy Roman Emperor, who in 1728 granted it to Austrian Count Lothar Franz von Schönborn. The castle gradually lost its strategic importance, its buildings were mainly used as a military ceremony. In 1787 Joseph II transformed the castle into a prison, and in 1746 he carried out minor repairs. After the first division of Poland in 1772, East Galicia was attached to the Austrian Empire, and the castle finally lost its strategic military significance.

In 1782 it was converted into a prison, and in the following decades many renowned revolutionaries suffered there. Among others, the leader of the Greek independence struggle Alexander Ypsilantis from 1821 to 1823, Ferenc Kazinczy, a Hungarian writer and language innovator, and 42 participants in the Martinovics conspiracy. A prisoner, Russian revolutionary Mikhail Bakunin and Franz Reindl, Guard Captain, who in 1832 committed an assassination attempt against the future Emperor Ferdinand I of Austria. The prisoners were kept in chains in extremely bad conditions. From 11 December 1805 to 10 March 1806, for 88 days, escaping from Napoleon, the Holy Crown of Hungary was concealed under arrest in the castle.

On the evening of July 27, 1834, a curtain of a small window of a castle building was lit with a candle. There was a huge fire that lasted for almost a week. All the wooden constructions of the castle were burnt down. After the fire, it was rebuilt, its buildings covered with tile instead of shingles. It has survived to this day. On July 11, 1847, Sándor Petőfi visited the castle. He wrote to his friend, Frigyes Kerényi his No.XIII travel letter. After March 15, 1848, the laborers opened the casemates of the castle prison and released the prisoners. To commemorate this, a linden tree was planted in the semi-circular bastion of the Upper Castle, which was later named the Tree of Freedom, but the tree grew too tall and was devastated by a storm on July 21, 1960.

On April 22, 1849, the castle's defenders struck the imperial troops under the leadership of Pál Mezőssy, castle captain, at the Latorca bridge in Podhering. In 1901, an obelisk was set up at the scene of the winning battle. When Nicholas I, Russian Tsar, came to help the Austrian emperor, defenders of the Munkács Castle (32 officers and 1329 public soldiers) were forced to give up on August 26, 1849. On July 1, 1855, upon the decree of Emperor Franz Joseph I, the castle was again converted into a prison, and many soldiers of the War of Independence lived their cells.

In 1857–1859, transformations were made in the castle. The prisoners were also involved in the work. In October 1896, on the occasion of the millennium celebrations, the Hungarian Ministry of Justice terminated the operation of the prison, and the prisoners were transferred to other institutions. The castle was bought by the Ministry of Finance for 393,859 crowns and was entrusted by the Bereg County Treasury. However, there was not enough money to do so, so it began to decay.

In 1896, at the millennium of the Hungarian conquest of the Carpathian Basin a 33-metre-tall (108 ft) monument was raised in the castle. On the top of the monument was a large turul, the mythological bird of the Hungarians. In 1924 the statue and monument were removed by the Czechoslovak authorities. Since 1939, when Carpathian Ruthenia was temporarily part of Hungary, the statue was re-erected. In 1945 the occupying Soviet Red Army melted down the statue to make red stars. In 2008 the turul statue was again re-erected at an inauguration ceremony by Zoltán Lengyel, acting mayor of Mukachevo.

== Mukachevo Castle in the 20th century and today ==
After World War I, when Carpathian Ruthenia was annexed to Czechoslovakia under the Treaty of Trianon, the castle was first used by the Czechoslovak army (1919-1938), and then by the barracks of the Royal Hungarian Army 1939-1944. From 1945 it was used as barracks of the Soviet Army. Between 1962 and 1973 it was used by the Industrial Secondary School to train agricultural machine (tractor) operators.

Between 1971 and 1993, the Lviv Restoration Institute was active in the castle. It is argued that more damage was done to the castle in this period than in several centuries of sieges. The ruined castle has recently undergone "real" refurbishment work, and there are several exhibitions in the restored rooms. Here is the Mukachevo Historical Museum, based on the material of the Lehoczki Collection, which includes objects from all ages. An outstanding event was the Munkácsy Exhibition, held in the castle in 2007, where most of the painter's works were presented.

The total area of the castle is 14,000 m^{2}. The castle consists of 130 different rooms with a complex system of underground passages connecting them. The castle currently houses a museum dedicated to the history of Mukachevo and the castle.

In 2021 the castle become available for viewing in Google Street View.

In October 2022 a Turul (a national symbol of Hungary) located on the castle was replaced by a Tryzub (a national symbol of Ukraine). In February 2023 Ukrainian MP and father of Mayor of Mukachevo Andriy Baloha, Viktor Baloha claimed this replacement led to him being banned to entry of Hungary.

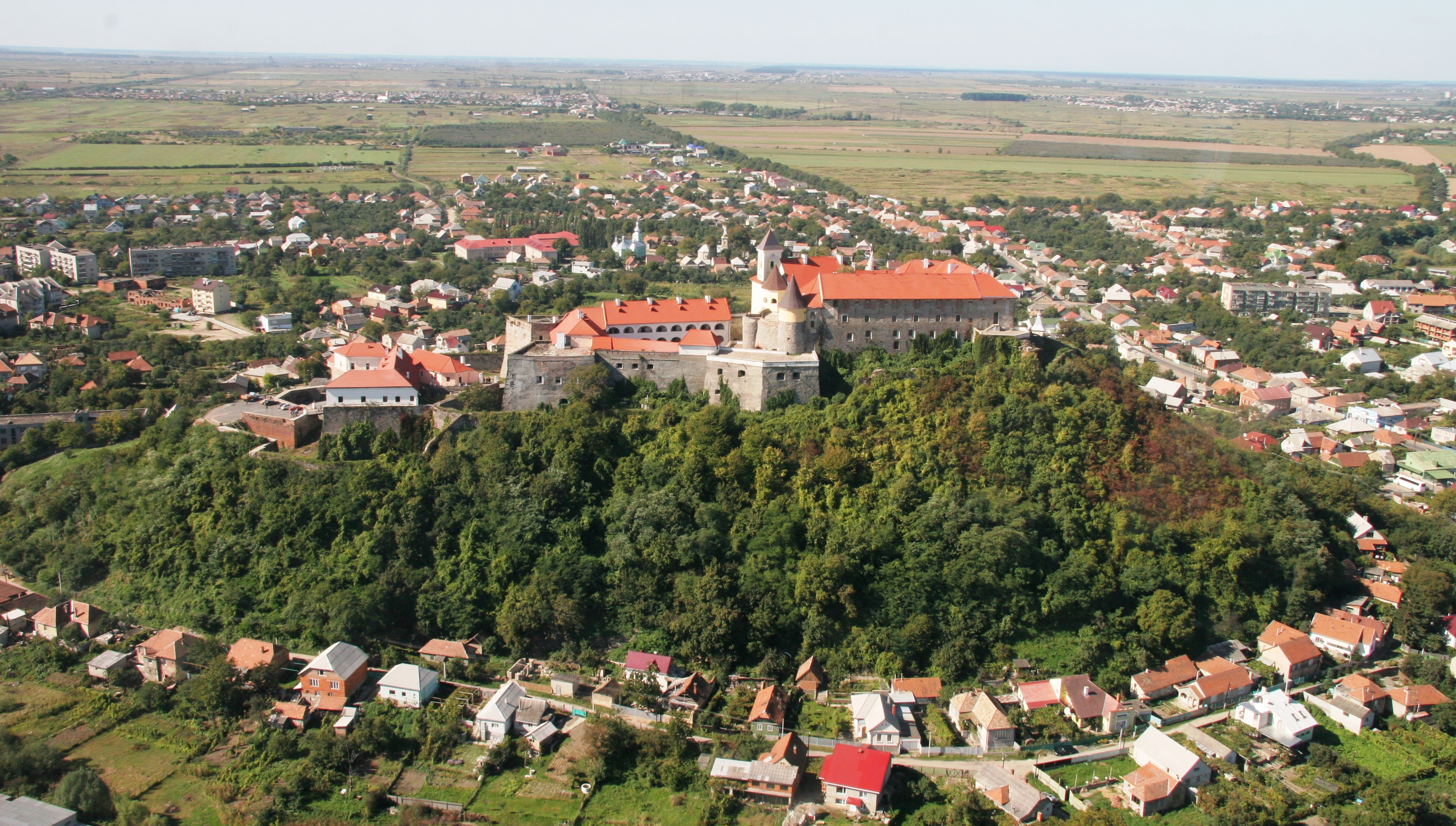
View of the Palanok Castle hill.

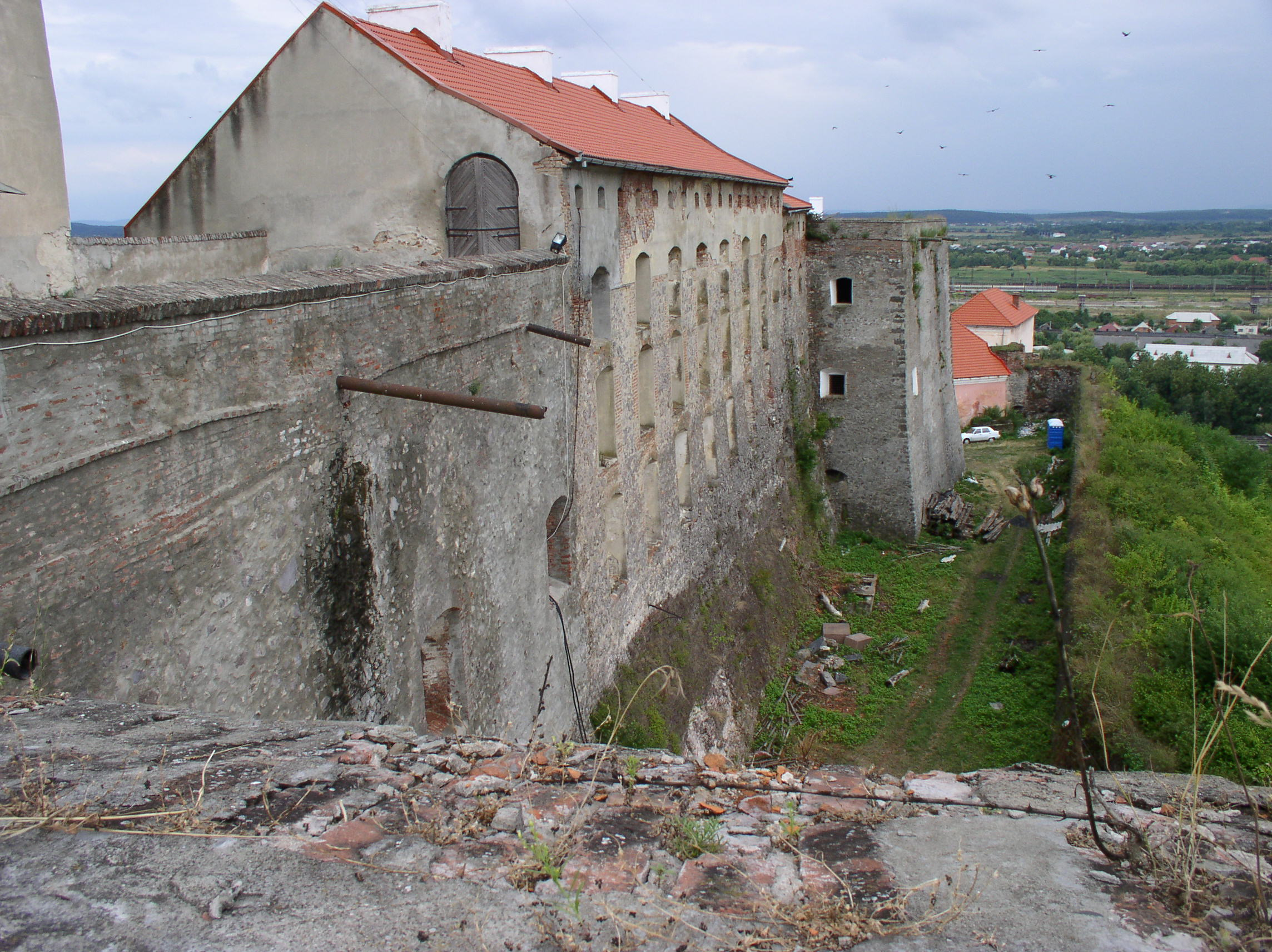
Although some parts of the castle are currently being rebuilt, other parts are still in disrepair.

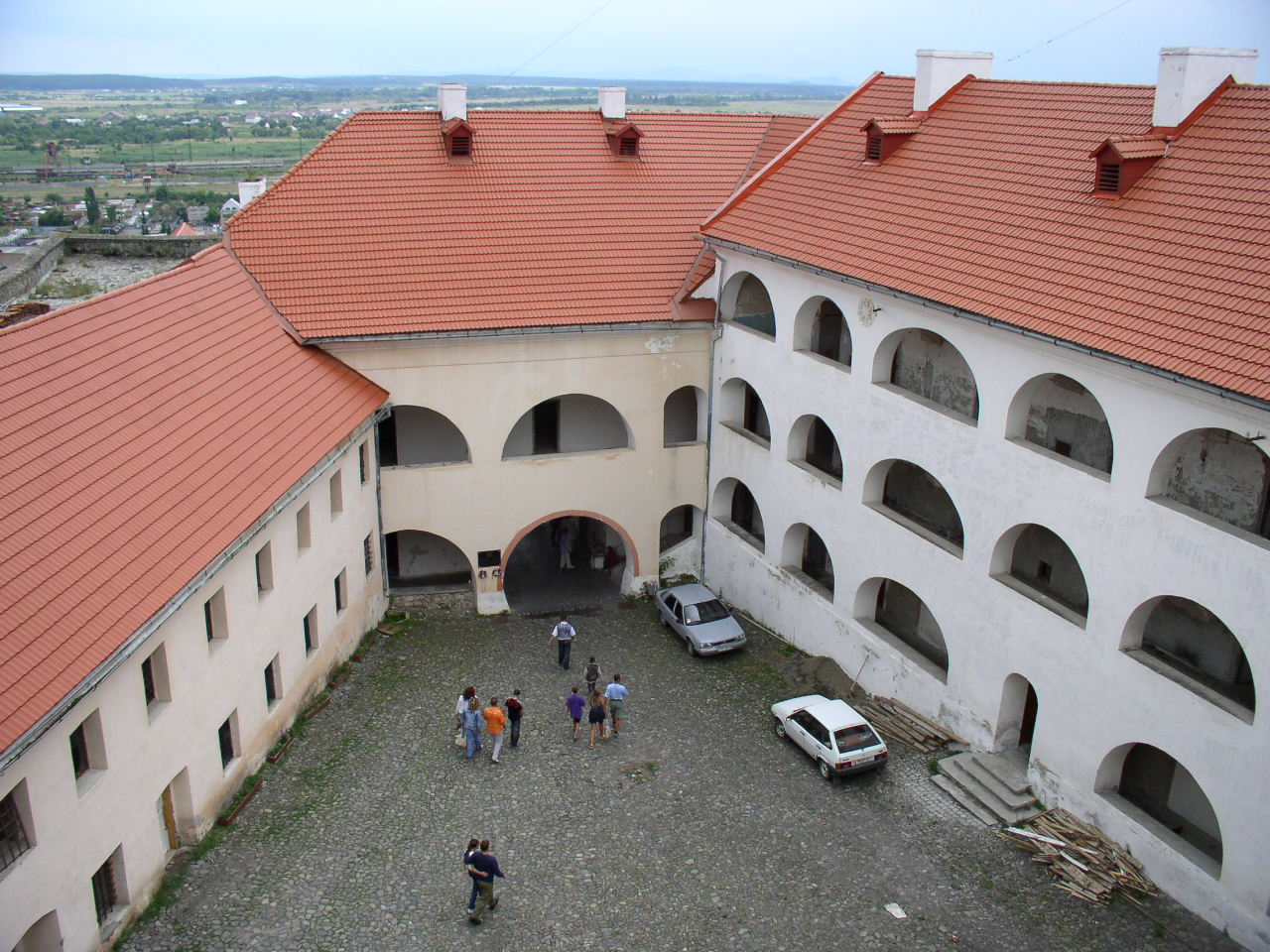
An interior courtyard of the castle, seen with modern roofs.

Closer shot of the clock tower.

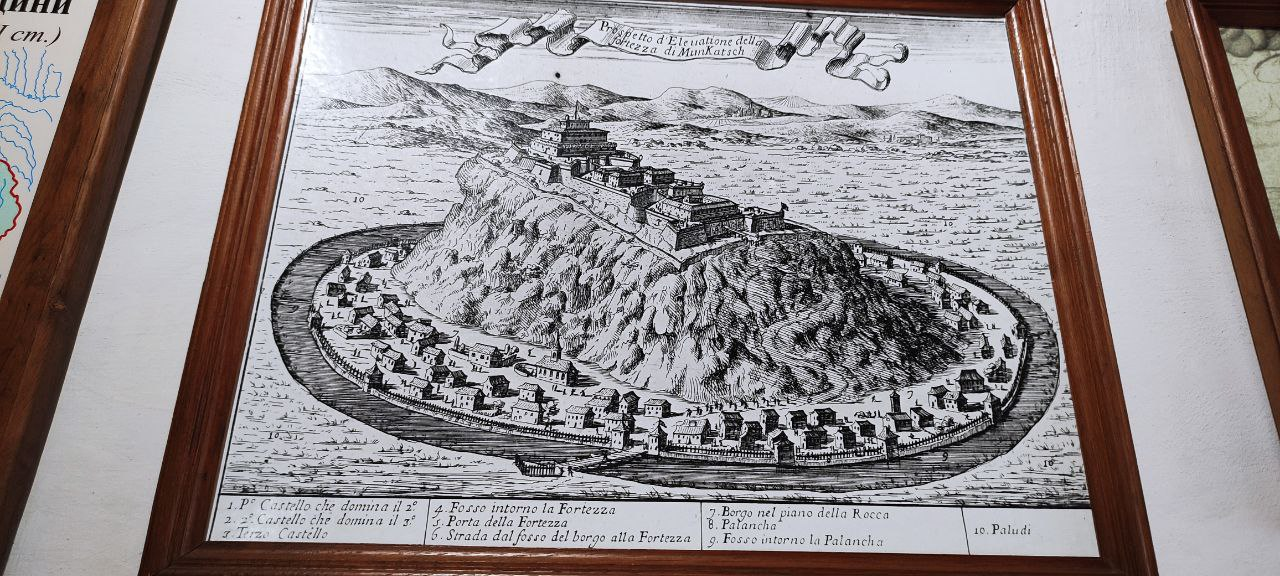
Photo of the engraving of Palanok Castle

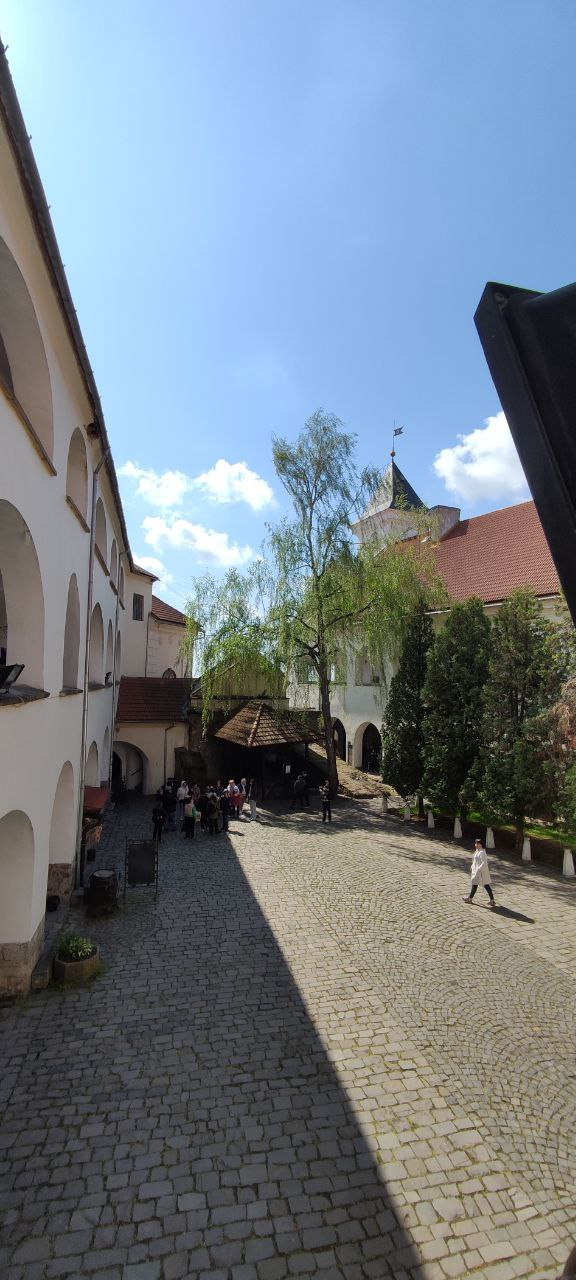
Upper courtyard of Palanok Castle

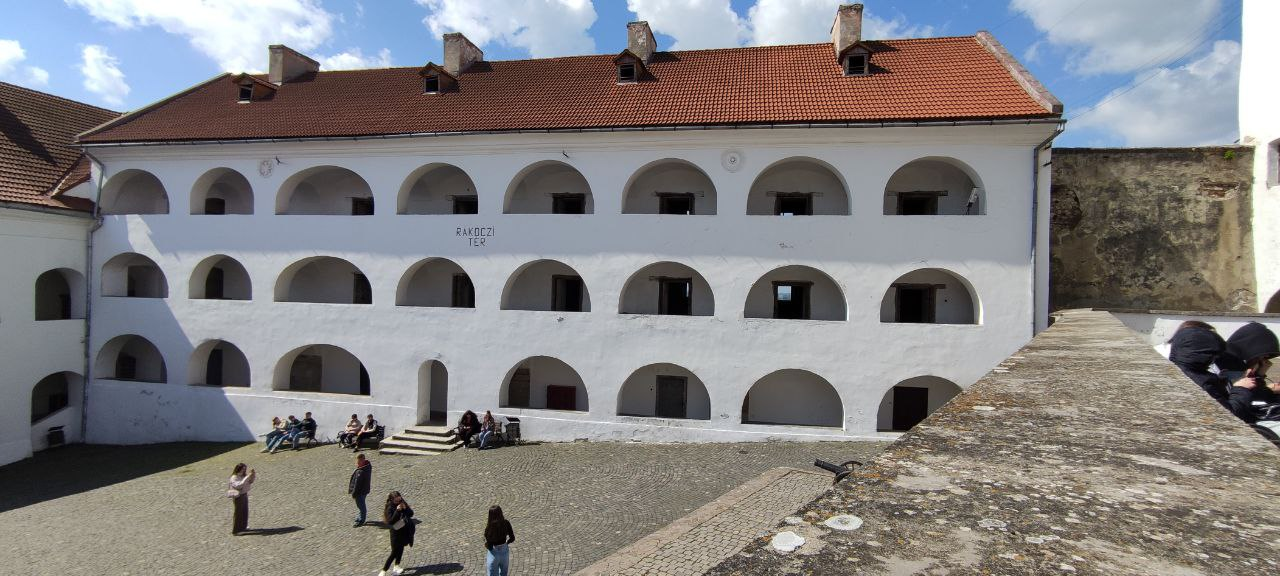
Inner courtyard of Palanok Castle

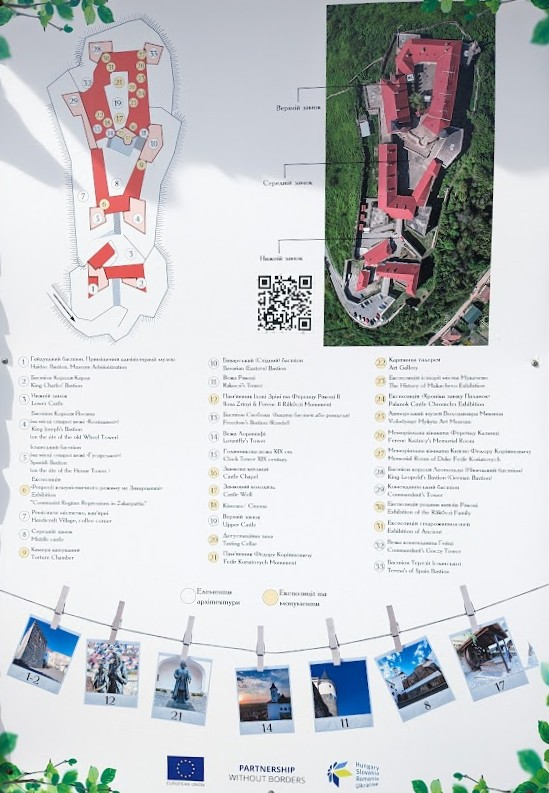
Map of Palanok Castle
