= Theodor, Prince of Podolia =

Podolian prince

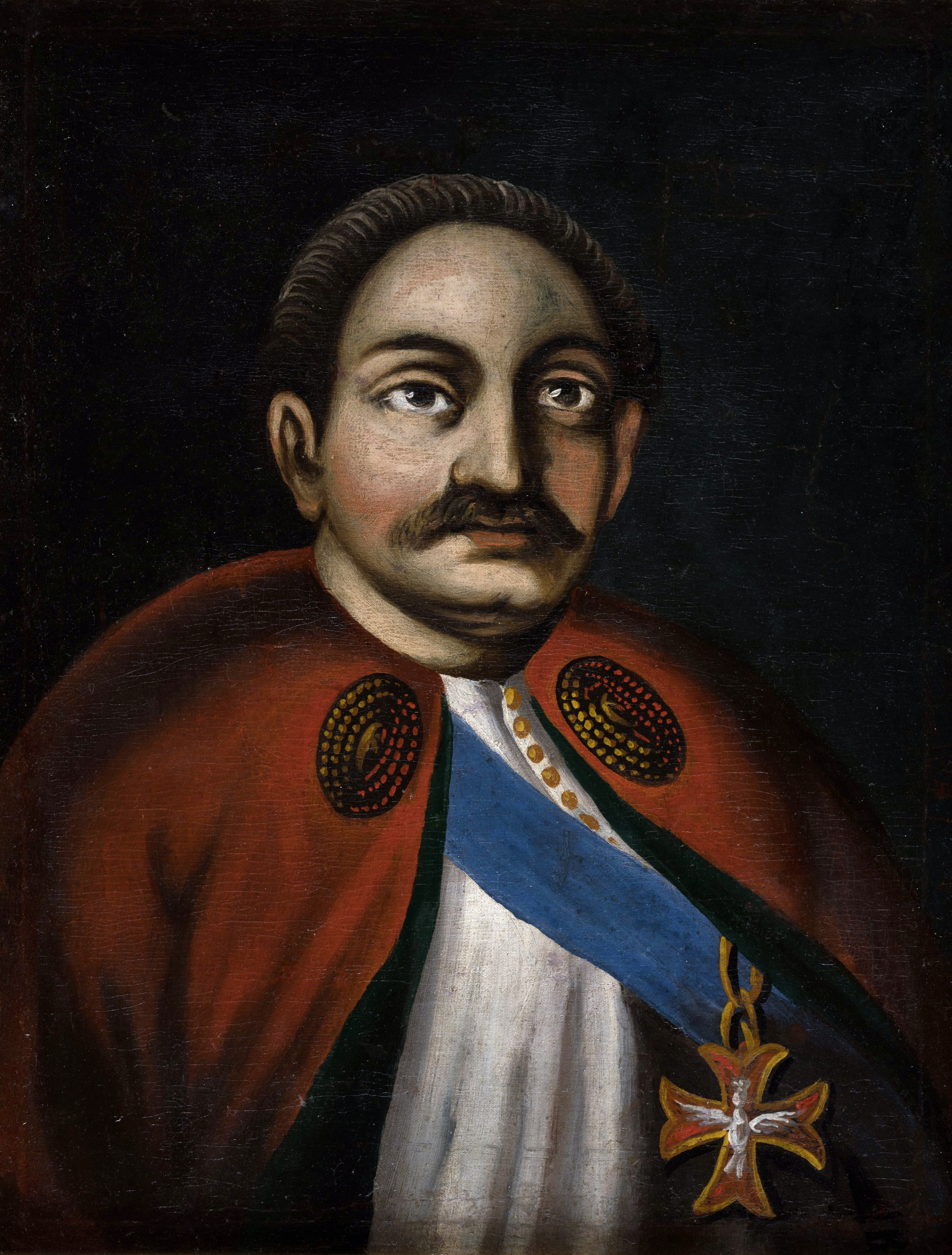

Duchy of Podolia
- Reign: 1389 — 1393
- Predecessor: Konstantyn Koriatovych
- Successor: Spytko II of Melsztyn
- Died: 1414; Munkács, Kingdom of Hungary (today Mukachevo, Ukraine)
- House: Koriatovychi
- Father: Karijotas
- Mother: Olha Koriatovych

Theodor, Prince of Podolia (Polish: Fiodor Koriatowicz, Ukrainian: Федір Коріятович, Lithuanian: Teodoras Karijotaitis, died 1414 in Mukachevo) was a member of the Gediminids dynasty branch in what is now Ukraine. Son of Karijotas.

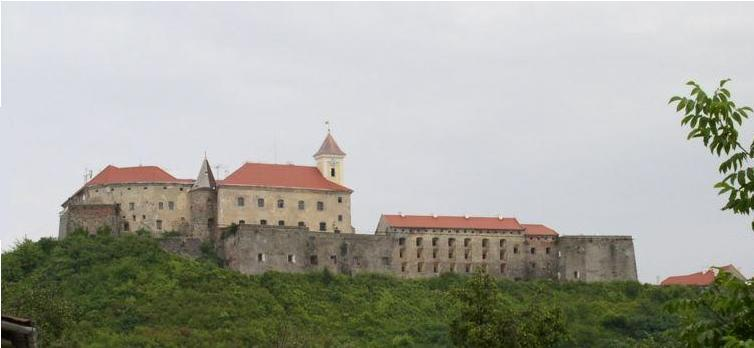
Palanok Castle strengthened by Fеdir

Fedir inherited Navahrudak Castle from his father. After Grand Duchy of Lithuania gained Podolia as a result of the decisive victory against the Golden Horde at the Battle of Blue Waters in 1362, he with his three brothers were appointed by Grand Duke Algirdas to administrate the region. After the last of his brothers died circa 1389, he remained the sole administrator of Podolia for three years until his exile by the Grand Duke Vytautas the Great.

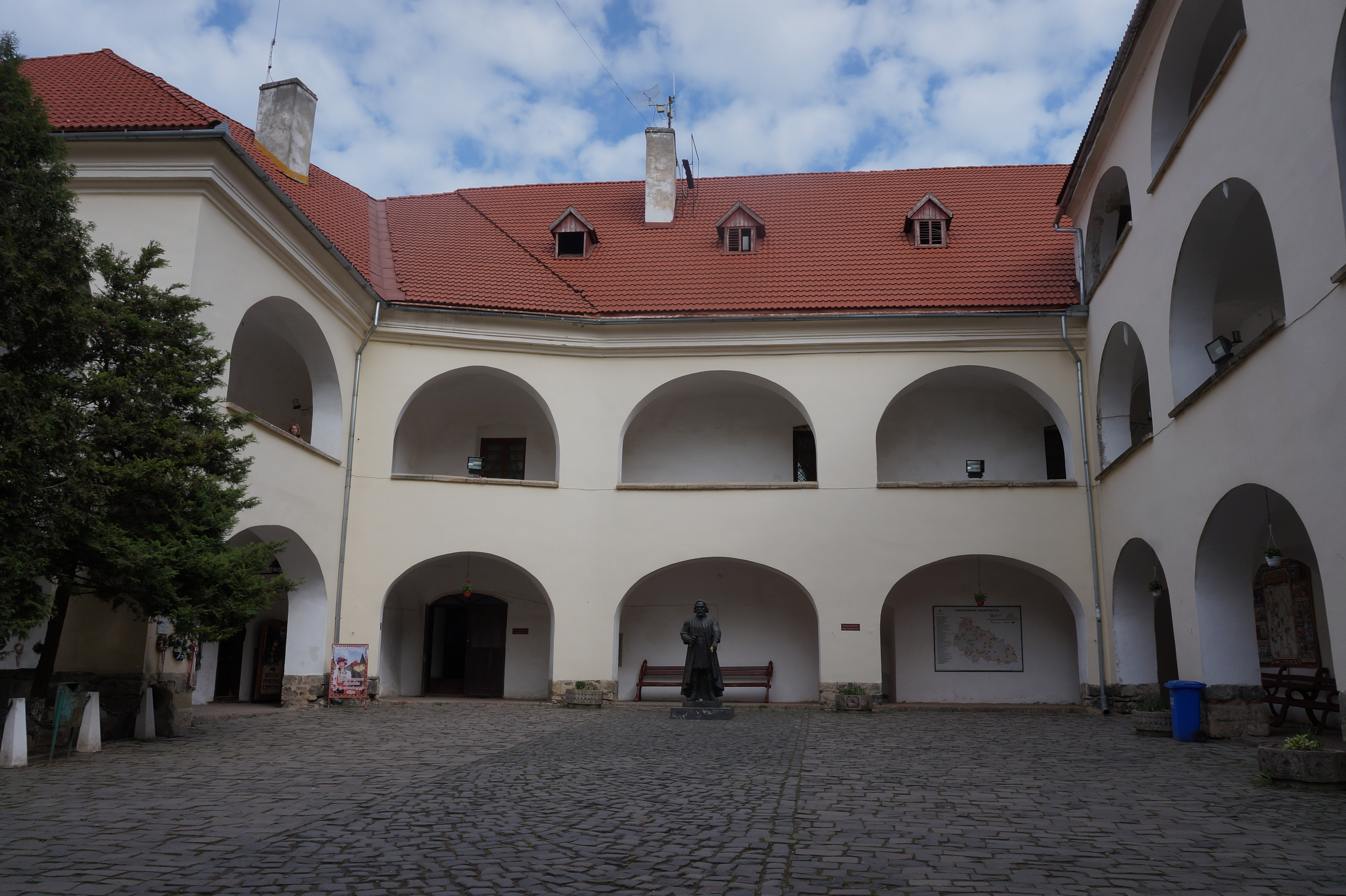
Fedir Koriatovich monument in Palanok Castle

In 1392 he disobeyed Vytautas the Great and was forced into exile. In 1396, Koriatovych purchased the city of Munkács in the Kingdom of Hungary (today Mukachevo, Ukraine), settling himself in the city's Palanok Castle, which would become one of the most protected castles in the region.
