= Polyvalent Hall (Vaslui) =

Indoor arena in Vaslui, Romania

Sala Polivalentă Vaslui
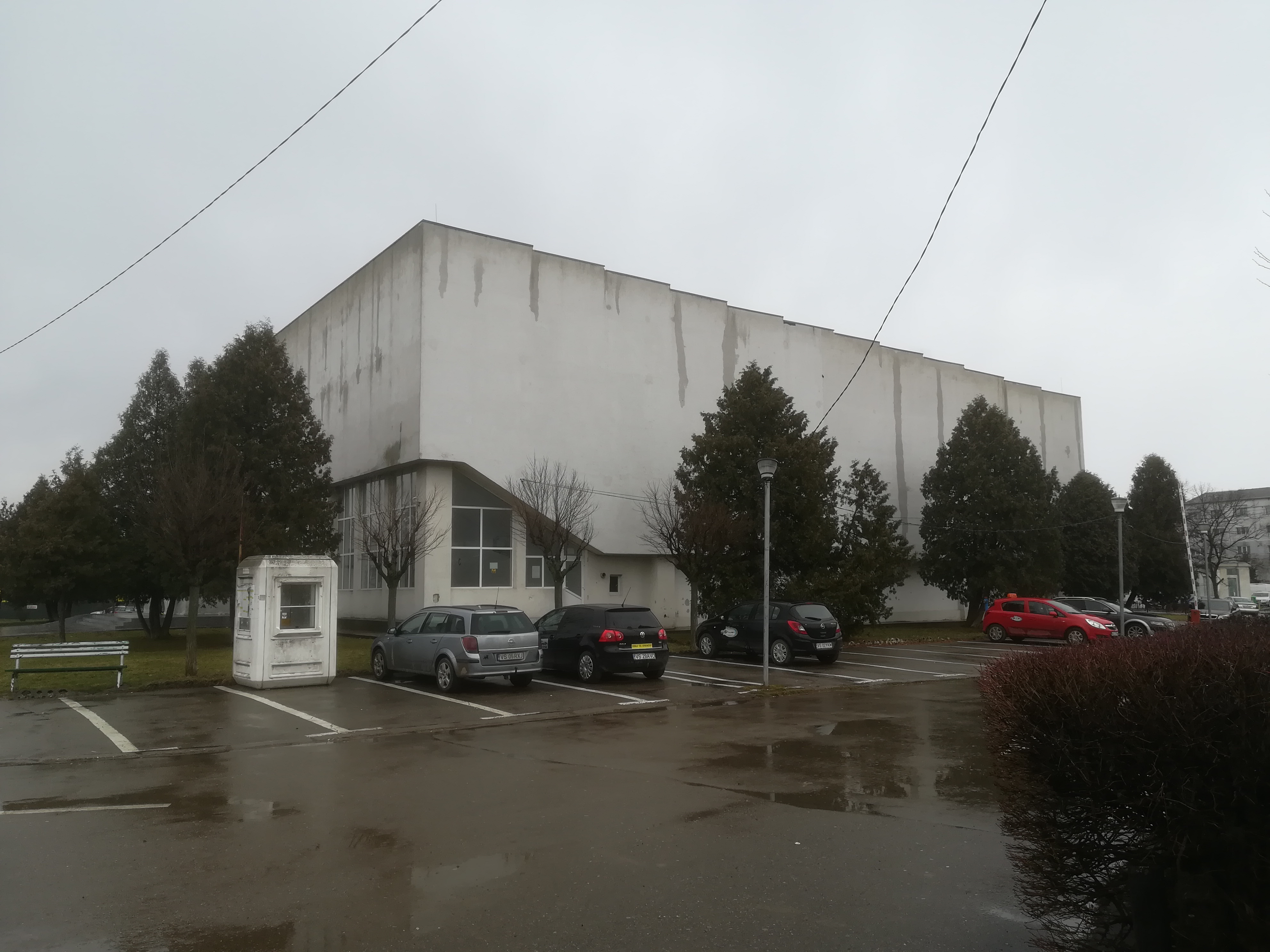
- View of venue (2021)
- Interactive map of Sala Polivalentă Vaslui
- Full name: Sala Polivalentă Vaslui
- Former names: Sala Sporturilor Vaslui
- Location: Vaslui, Romania
- Coordinates: 46°38′8″N 27°44′5.4″E 46°38'00.8"N 27°44'05.4"E
- Owner: Municipality of Vaslui
- Operator: CSM Vaslui
- Capacity: 1,500 (handball)
- Surface: Maple wood

Construction
- Opened: 1980s
- Renovated: 2010s

Tenant
- CSM Vaslui

Vaslui Polyvalent Hall is an indoor arena located in Vaslui, Romania. It is the home arena of the men's professional handball club CSM Vaslui and has a capacity of 1,500 seats.
