= Diocese of Bacău =

Former Roman Catholic diocese in Moldavia

Diocese of Bacău Dioecesis Baccoviensis

Location
- Ecclesiastical province: Lwów

Information
- Denomination: Roman Catholic
- Rite: Latin Rite
- Established: 1591
- Dissolved: 1818

The Roman Catholic Diocese of Bacău (Polish: diecezja bakowska) was a diocese of the Latin Church in Moldavia (present Romania).

== History ==
- Since the 13th century, missionaries of the mendicant orders, Franciscans and Dominicans, created several Latin Catholic communities in present Romania, for whom the Holy See decided to created bishoprics, south and east of the Carpathians (in Walachia and Moldavia), generally short-lived; the most durable was to be Bacău. The diocese was created in 1590 (or 1591) by Pope Sixtus V. It was first situated in Curtea de Argeş (in Walachia; which had been the see of on earlier Latin Diocese of Argeș, vacated over a century earlier).
- Due to the Ottoman occupation of the region in the early 17th century, the see was moved in 1607 to Bacău in Moldavia, which region had earlier had at least three Latin bishoprics: Diocese of Milcovia, Diocese of Siret and Diocese of Baia). Initially the see of Bacău was a suffragan of the Hungarian Archdiocese of Kalocsa.
- In 1611, its territory was extended vastly, comprising in Walachia three 3 parishes, a Franciscan monastery and a Dominican one, and in Moldavia 35 parishes (only 9 having a resident priest). Also in the 1610s, Bacău fell into the sway of the Catholic Polish–Lithuanian Commonwealth. From 1621, its new Metropolitan was the Archdiocese of Lwów in Poland (now in Ukraine) and Polish Friars Minor were nominated to the see requiring the assent of the King of Poland, who could reside in Lwów provided they visited the bishopric annually, while delegating daily administration to an apostolic vicar (properly a vicar general), who resided at Iași. From 1621 it also had jurisdiction in the eastern part of Moldavia (which later became known as Bessarabia). Its cathedral (1627, now Biserica de vizitarea Maicii Domnului) was dedicated the Visitation of Mary.
- In the 18th century, the episcopal residence was shifted to Iași (the capital of Moldavia) or to Śniatyn, Poland (now in Ukraine). In 1774 the diocese had 10 parochial churches and circa 8.000 baptized Catholics. Around 1800, the see was vacant for decades after the Partitions of Poland, then a few bishops were appointed again.
- It was suppressed in 1818, its territory being reassigned to establish the (pre-diocesan) Apostolic Vicariate of Moldavia (now Diocese of Iași), yet it was still mentioned in the Annuario Pontificio till 1840.

== Episcopal ordinaries ==
(all Roman Rite)

Suffragan Bishops of Bacău

- Bernardino Quirini, Friars Minor (O.F.M.) (1591.01.07 appointed by Pope Gregory XIV – death 1604.10)
- Gerolamo Arsengo, Conventual Franciscans (O.F.M. Conv.) (1607.02.17 – death 1610?)
- Walerian Lubieniecki, O.F.M. (1611.04.18 – death 1617)
- Adam Górski, O.F.M. Conv. (1618.11.26 – death 1626)
- Mikołaj Gabriel Fredro, O.F.M. Conv. (1627.07.19 – death 1632?)

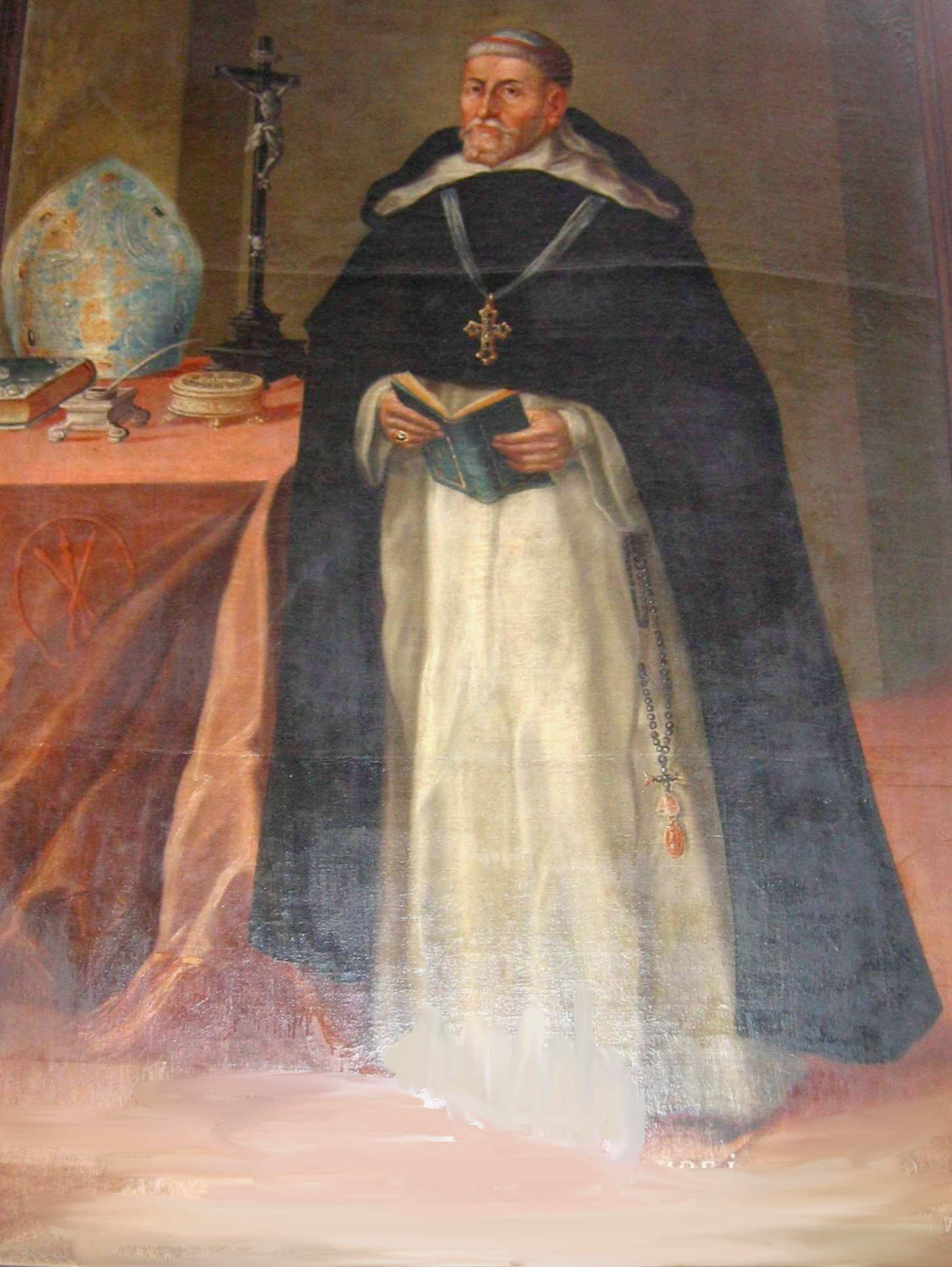
Jan Chryzostom Zamoyski, 6th Bishop of Bacău

- Jan Chryzostom Zamoyski, Dominican Order (O.P.) (1633.07.18 – 1649.12.06), next Bishop of Przemyśl (Poland) (1649.12.06 – 1654.10.19), Bishop of Łuck (Poland) (1654.10.19 – death 1655.01.01)
- Maciej Marian Kurski, O.F.M. (1651.05.07 – 1661.02.21), next Titular Bishop of Ænos (1661.02.21 – 1681.03.27) as Auxiliary Bishop of Diocese of Poznań (Poland) (1661.02.21 – death 1681.03.27)
- Anastazy Rudnicki, O.F.M. (1662.07.31 – death 1675.08)
- Jakub Górecki, O.P. (1678.01.31 – ?death ?)
- Jakub Franciszek Dłuski (1681.12.22 – ?)
- Armand Wiktoryn Cieszejko, O.P. (1694.03.15 – ?)
- Franciszek Biegański, O.F.M. Conv. (1698.11.24 – death 1709.01)

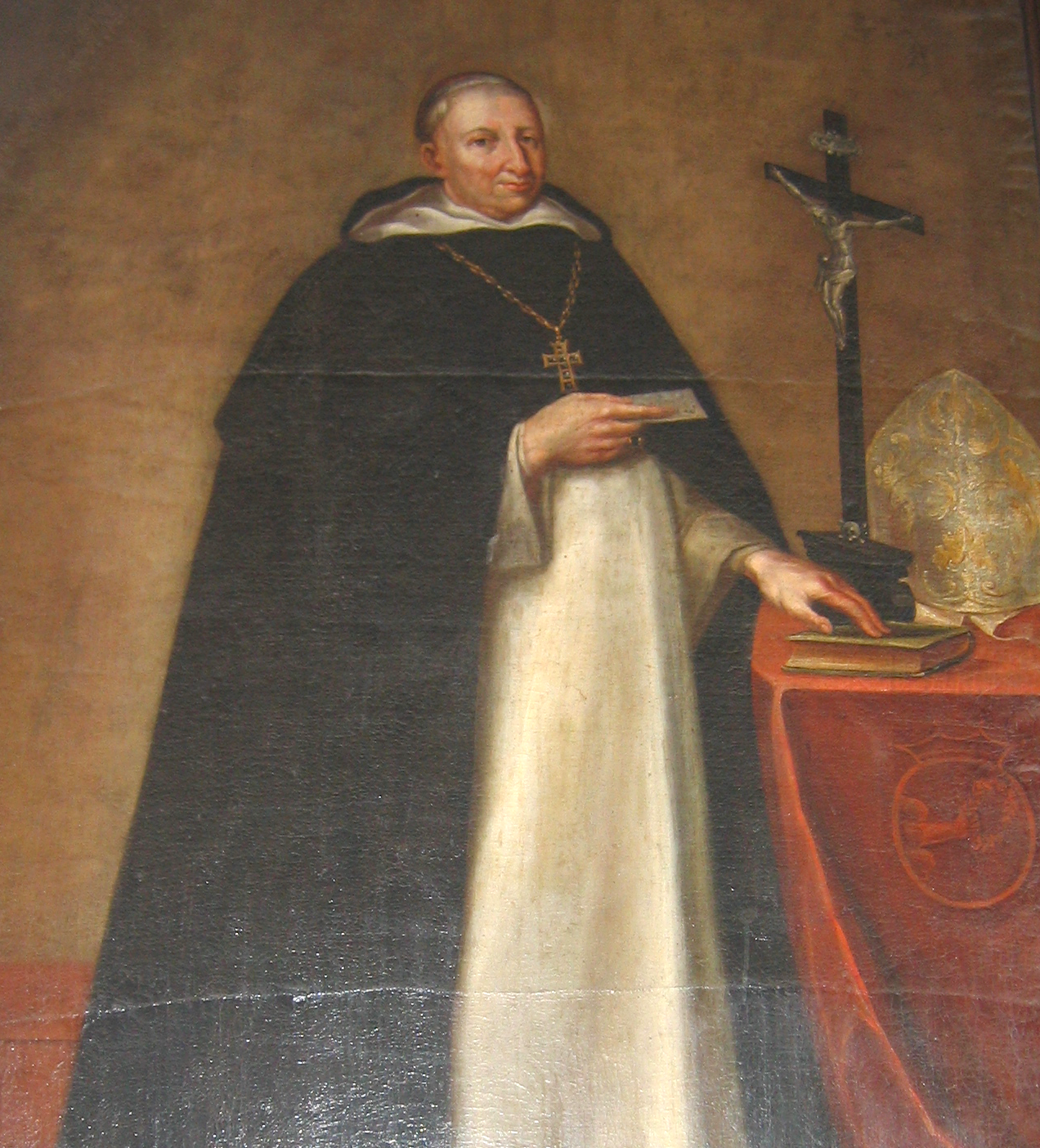
Jan Damascen Lubieniecki, 13th Bishop of Bacău

- Jan Damascen Lubieniecki, O.P. (1711.02.23 – ?)
- Adrian Skrzetuski, O.F.M. Conv. (1715.09.23 – ?)
- Jozafat Parysowicz, O.F.M. Conv. (1717.06.14 – death 1732?)
- Stanisław Rajmund Jezierski, O.P. (1737.12.20 – death 1782.04.28)
  - Coadjutor Bishop: Ignacy Franciszek Ossoliński, O.F.M. Conv. (1765.04.22 – 1773.12.20), Titular Bishop of Dardanus (1765.04.22 – 1774.01.07), next Coadjutor Bishop of Kyiv–Černihiv (Poland) (1773.12.20 – 1774.01.07), succeeding as Bishop of Kyiv–Černihiv (Poland) (1774.01.07 – death 1784.08.07)
- Dominik Piotr Karwosiecki, O.F.M. Conv. (1782.04.28 – death 1789.09.30), succeeding as previous Titular Bishop of Byblus (1774.05.09 – 1782.04.28) and Coadjutor Bishop of Bacău (1774.05.09 – 1782.04.28)
- long vacancy
- Bonaventura Carenzi, O.F.M. Conv. (?Italian) (1808.12.20 – 1814.09.26), next Bishop of Città della Pieve (Italy) (1814.09.26 – 1817.11.13)
- Giuseppe Bonaventura Berardi, O.F.M. Conv.) (1815.03.20 – death 1818.04.10).

== See also ==
- List of Catholic dioceses in Romania
- Moldavian Magnate Wars

== Sources and external links ==
- GCatholic - former bshopric
- GCatholic - former cathedral

Bibliography

- Pius Bonifacius Gams, Series episcoporum Ecclesiae Catholicae, Leipzig 1931, p. 365
- Karl Auner, Începuturile episcopiei de Bacău, „Revista Catolică”, I, București, 1912, pp. 383–408.
- Konrad Eubel, Hierarchia Catholica Medii Aevi, vol. 3, p. 116; vol. 4, p. 107; vol. 5, p. 111; vol. 6, pp. 112–113
- Gaetano Moroni, Dizionario di erudizione storico-ecclesiastica, vol. 4, p. 24 e vol. 46, pp. 26–28
- Radu Rosetti, Despre unguri și episcopiile catolice în Moldova, in Analele Academiei Române, Tom. XXVII, Memoriile Secțiunii Istorice No. 10, Institutul de Arte Grafice „Carol Göbl” București, 1905, pp. 297–301

Further reading

- Wojciech Jakubowski; Marek Stolarczyk. Organizacja Kościoła Rzymskokatolickiego na ziemiach polskich od X do XXI wieku: informatorium historyczne. Aspra-JR. ISBN 978-83-7545-262-4.
