= Vaslui =

- Municipality
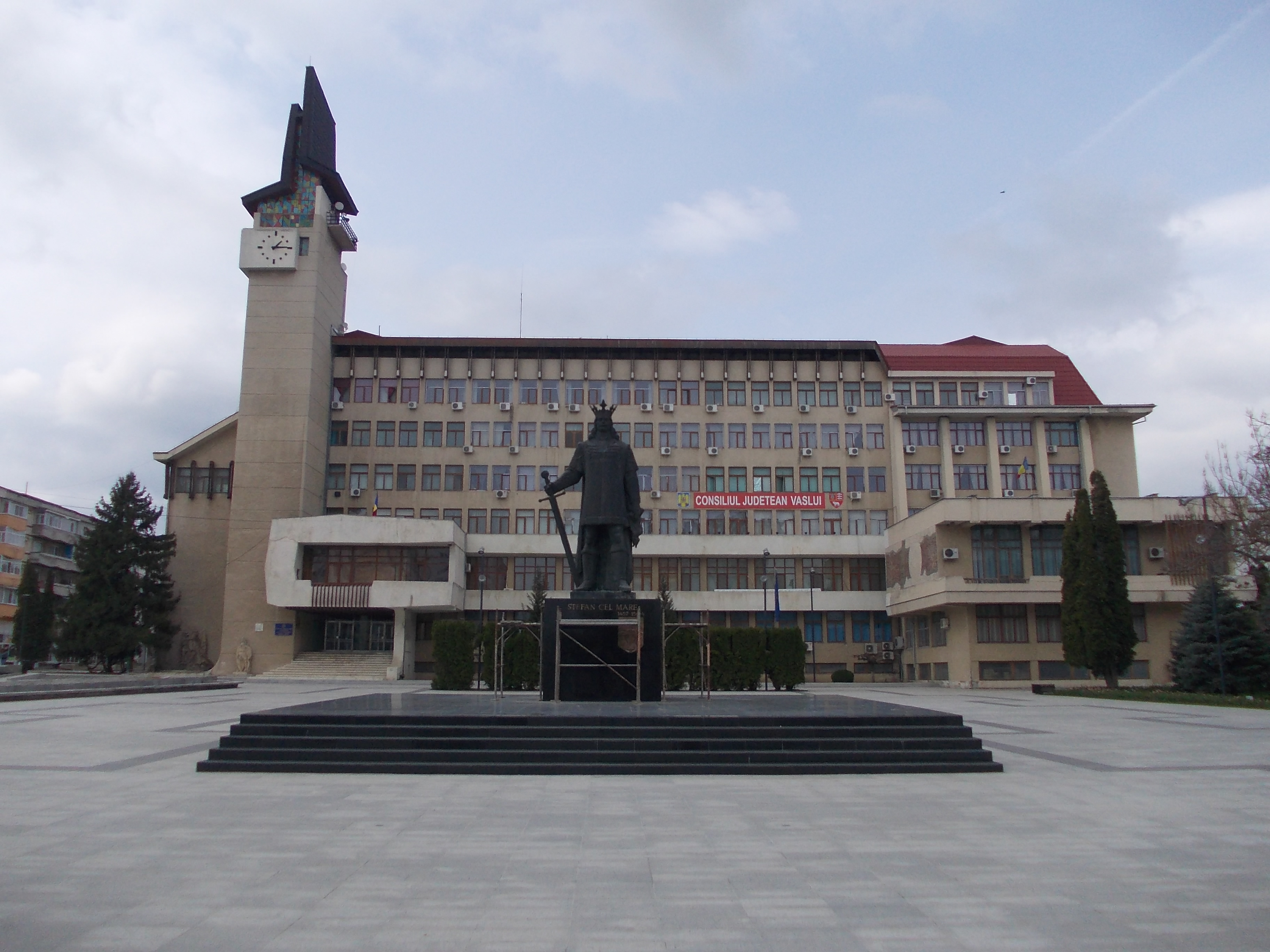
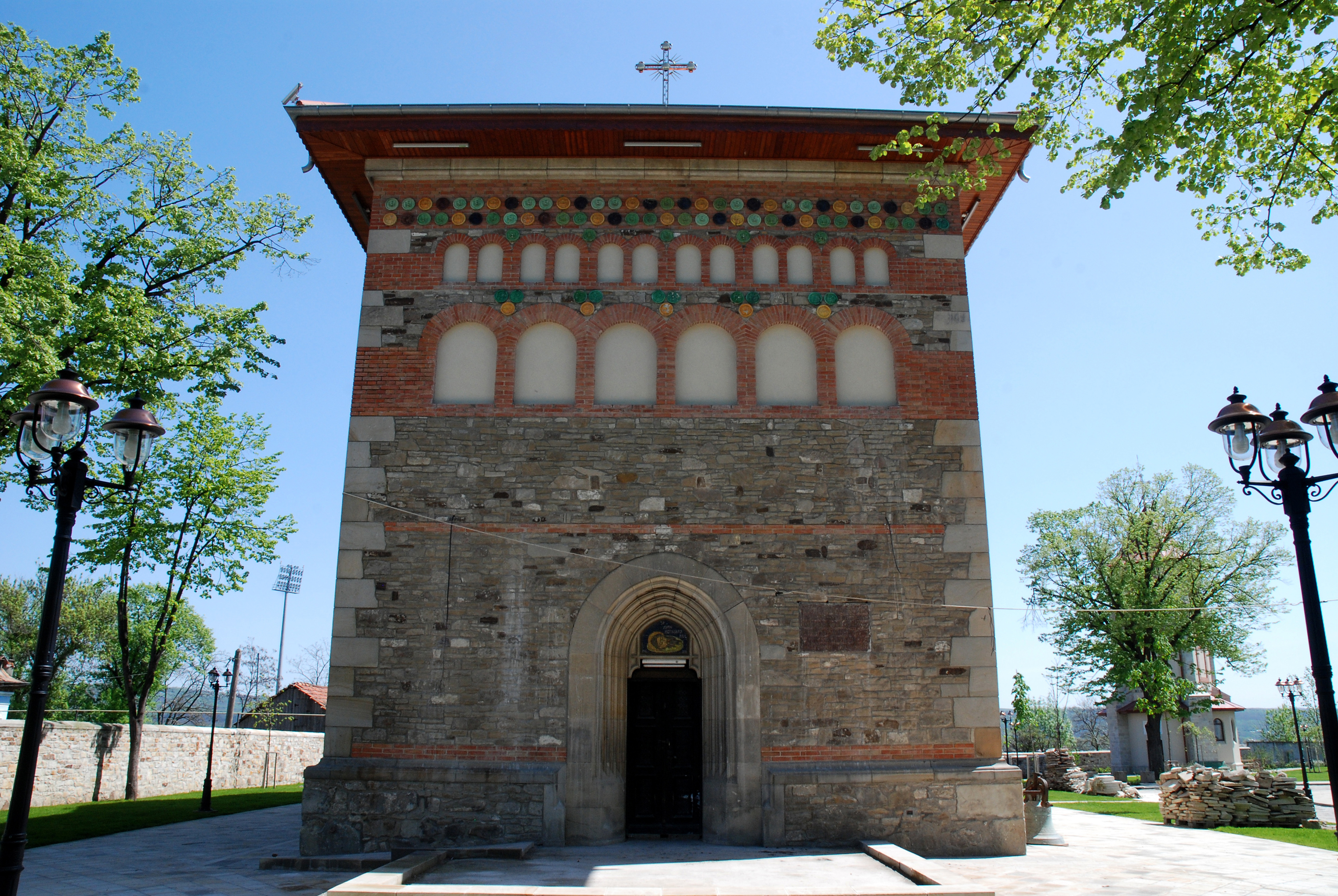
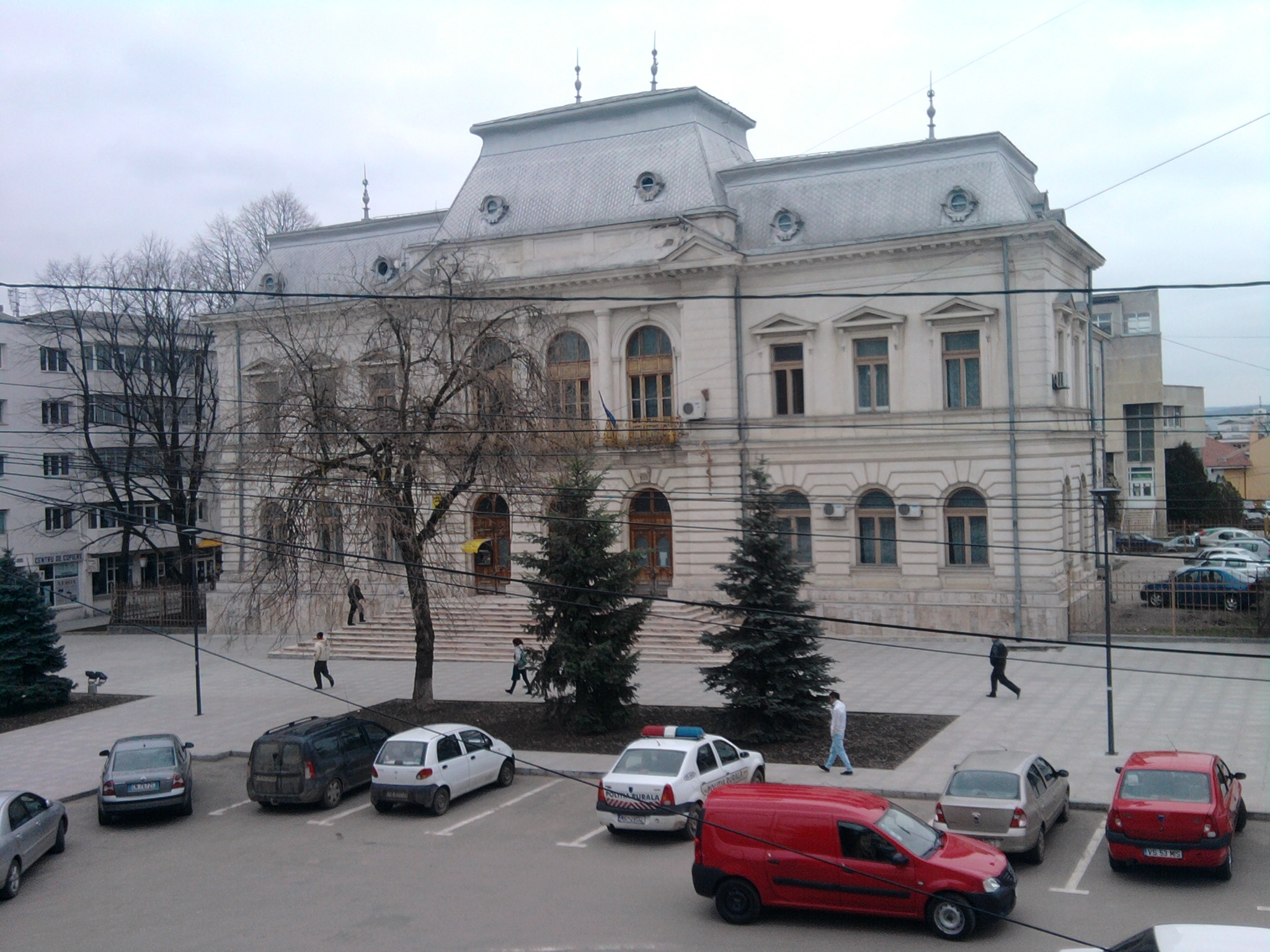
- Administrative Palace John the Baptist Church Palace of Justice

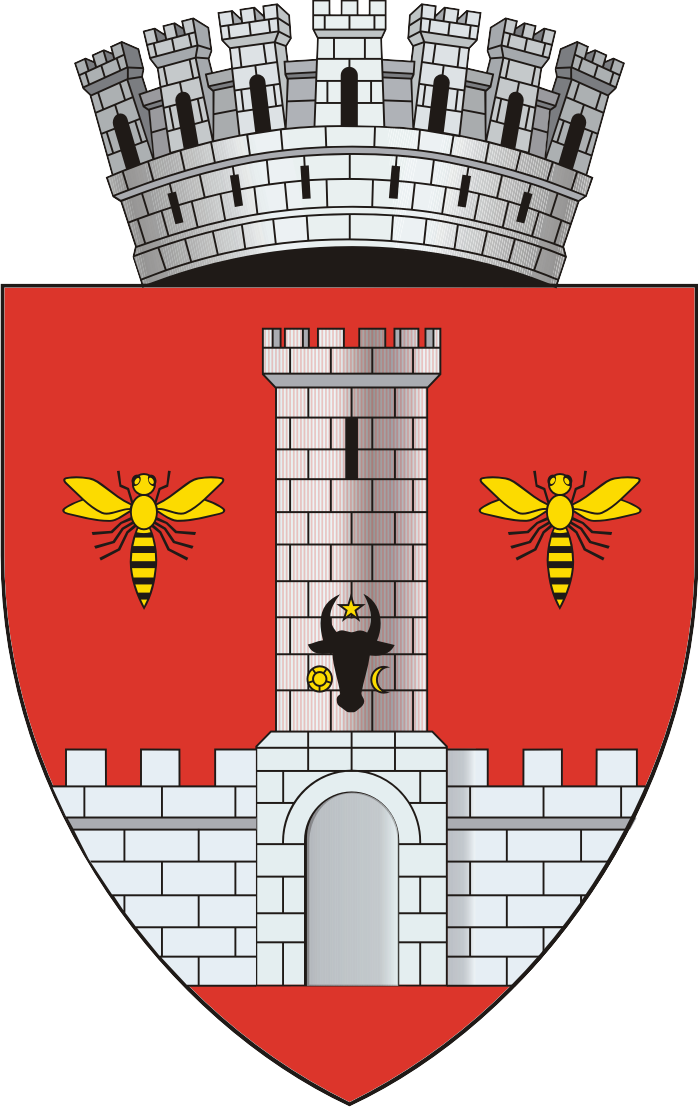
- Coat of arms

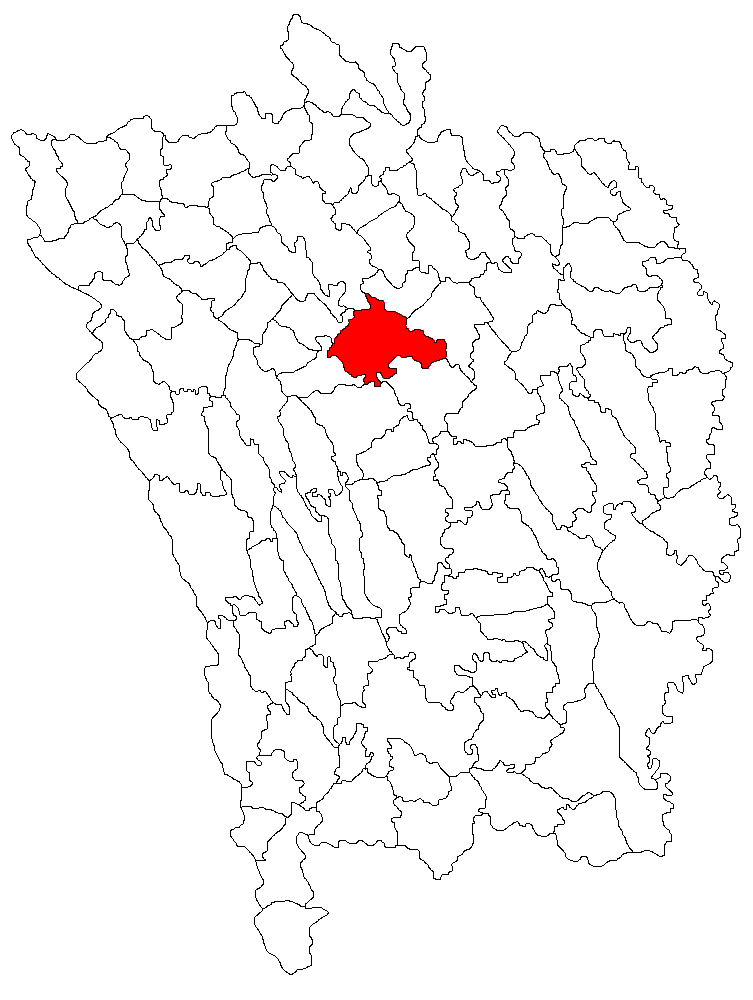
- Location in Vaslui County

- Location in Romania
- Coordinates: 46°38′18″N 27°43′45″E
- Country: Romania
- County: Vaslui

Government
  - Mayor (2024–2028): Lucian Braniște (PSD)
- Area: 68.44 km^{2} (26.42 sq mi)
- Elevation: 110 m (360 ft)
- Highest elevation: 170 m (560 ft)
- Lowest elevation: 90 m (300 ft)
- Population (2021-12-01): 63,035
  - Density: 921.0/km^{2} (2,385/sq mi)
- Time zone: UTC+02:00 (EET)
  - Summer (DST): UTC+03:00 (EEST)
- Postal code: 730006–730242
- Area code: (+40) 02 35
- Vehicle reg.: VS
- Website: www.primariavs.ro

Vaslui (Romanian pronunciation: [vasˈluj]), a city in eastern Romania, is the seat of Vaslui County, in the historical region of Western Moldavia. The city administers five villages: Bahnari, Brodoc, Moara Grecilor, Rediu, and Viișoara.

== History ==
Archaeological surveys indicate that the territory of Vaslui was inhabited since the Neolithic. From the 14th century onwards, it developed as the provincial town of Vaslui, with a population that fluctuated considerably in the following centuries. The name of Vaslui appears first in a Polish document from 1375, referring to Koriat's son Yuri Koriatovich. The name Vaslui was also mentioned in 1435, in connection with the accession of Prince Iliaș to the Moldavian throne. The town was burned to the ground in 1439 and 1440 when Tatars invaded Moldavia.

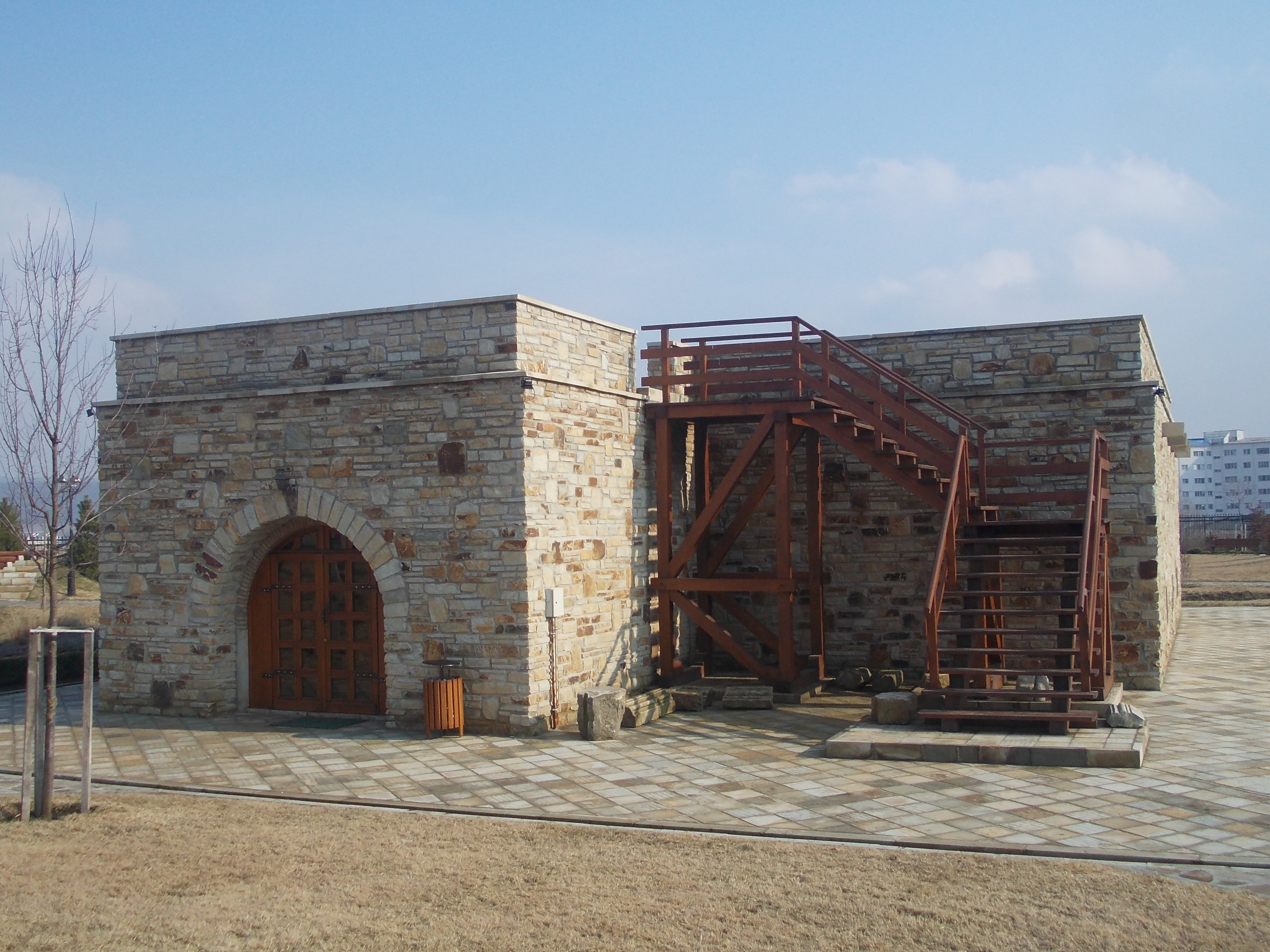
Building from the medieval Princely Court historical ensemble in Vaslui

The peak of Vaslui's importance was in the 15th century, when it was a second-rank capital of Moldavia, during the reign of Stephen the Great (r. 1457–1504) and its population approached that of the neighbouring Iași. In 1475, Prince Stephen won his greatest battle against the Ottoman Empire in the Vaslui area. Once the Moldavian capital was moved from Suceava to Iași and the southern town of Bârlad became an administrative center of southern Moldavia, Vaslui declined for the next three centuries to eventually become a local borough (târg).

There once was a fairly large Jewish community in the city of Vaslui. Its arrival from Galicia during the second half of the 19th century gave a new impetus to local economic development. In 1899, Jews formed 37% of the population, and Vaslui was home to the Vasloi Hasidic dynasty. However, waves of pogroms, associated with the Holocaust (see Romania during World War II and Holocaust in Romania) as well as emigration to Israel during Romania's communist period decimated this population.

During World War II, the Stephen the Great Monument was relocated from Chișinău to Vaslui. On 22 August 1944, Vaslui was captured by Soviet troops of the 2nd Ukrainian Front in the course of the Jassy–Kishinev Offensive.

The population of Vaslui grew steadily again after 1968, when the town was proclaimed as the administrative center of Vaslui County, with immigration from the neighbouring countryside, attracted by the industries set up by the Communist regime.

== Demographics ==
Historical population
Year	Pop.	±%
1912	10,397	—
1930	15,310	+47.3%
1941	13,923	−9.1%
1948	13,738	−1.3%
1956	14,850	+8.1%
1966	17,591	+18.5%
1977	39,435	+124.2%
1992	80,614	+104.4%
2002	70,571	−12.5%
2011	55,407	−21.5%
2021	63,035	+13.8%

According to the 2021 census, there were 63,035 people living within the city of Vaslui, making it the 40th largest city in Romania. The ethnic makeup was as follows: 98.63% Romanians, 1.19% Romani people, 0.06% Lipovans, and 0.12% other. The majority of the population is of Romanian ethnicity. Members of the Roma minority live compactly in the southwestern suburbs of Rediu and Brodoc, in the southwestern part of the main town (in the neighbourhoods around Traian Street) and also scattered in the rest of the locality. In the 1960s and '70s nomadic Roma belonging to the Kalderash caste were forcibly settled by the Communists in the northern part of the town, scattered among ethnic Romanians. The third ethnic group is that of the Lipovans, who have in the center of the town a church of their Old Believers Christian branch.

According to data provided by Romanian officials in 2017, the population of Vaslui was 100,170. The substantial increase compared to the 2011 census figures is because tens of thousands of dual citizens from neighboring Moldova come to Vaslui for their identity documents, where a Vaslui address is listed.

== Climate ==
Climate data for Vaslui (altitude 116m, 2014–2026 normals, extremes 1981–present)
Month	Jan	Feb	Mar	Apr	May	Jun	Jul	Aug	Sep	Oct	Nov	Dec	Year
Record high °C (°F)	17.6 (63.7)	22.2 (72.0)	26.0 (78.8)	29.8 (85.6)	35.1 (95.2)	37.0 (98.6)	39.9 (103.8)	41.2 (106.2)	36.8 (98.2)	33.4 (92.1)	26.3 (79.3)	19.2 (66.6)	41.2 (106.2)
Mean daily maximum °C (°F)	3.4 (38.1)	6.1 (43.0)	11.8 (53.2)	17.4 (63.3)	22.5 (72.5)	27.9 (82.2)	30.2 (86.4)	30.3 (86.5)	25.0 (77.0)	17.3 (63.1)	9.5 (49.1)	5.0 (41.0)	17.2 (63.0)
Daily mean °C (°F)	−0.4 (31.3)	2.0 (35.6)	6.2 (43.2)	11.0 (51.8)	15.9 (60.6)	21.2 (70.2)	23.2 (73.8)	22.8 (73.0)	17.9 (64.2)	11.4 (52.5)	5.9 (42.6)	1.9 (35.4)	11.6 (52.9)
Mean daily minimum °C (°F)	−4.2 (24.4)	−2.1 (28.2)	0.7 (33.3)	4.7 (40.5)	9.4 (48.9)	14.4 (57.9)	16.2 (61.2)	15.3 (59.5)	10.8 (51.4)	5.5 (41.9)	2.2 (36.0)	−1.2 (29.8)	6.0 (42.7)
Record low °C (°F)	−28.7 (−19.7)	−26.8 (−16.2)	−20.8 (−5.4)	−9.3 (15.3)	−2.3 (27.9)	4.8 (40.6)	7.2 (45.0)	4.9 (40.8)	−2.1 (28.2)	−13.5 (7.7)	−23.6 (−10.5)	−24.2 (−11.6)	−28.7 (−19.7)
Average precipitation mm (inches)	24.8 (0.98)	20.8 (0.82)	31.7 (1.25)	47.4 (1.87)	59.3 (2.33)	68.5 (2.70)	52.7 (2.07)	40.2 (1.58)	41.4 (1.63)	50.7 (2.00)	46.4 (1.83)	29.8 (1.17)	513.7 (20.23)
Average precipitation days (≥ 1.0 mm)	5.2	4.8	5.4	6.6	7.6	6.8	5.5	4.2	4.8	5.6	6.2	5.2	67.9
Average snowy days	9.8	6.2	3.2	0.9	0	0	0	0	0	0	2.6	5.5	28.2
Source: Meteomanz (2014-2026); Infoclimat (1980-2010); PAAR Vaslui

== Districts ==
Vaslui has several neighborhoods: 13 Decembrie, Ana Ipătescu, Castanilor, Copou, Delea, Alecu Donici, Gheorghe Racoviță, Green Park, Gura Bustei and Traian.

== Education ==
The city has ten schools, classes I – VIII, named after Ioan Cuza, Dimitrie Cantemir, Constantin Parfene, Elena Cuza, Ștefan cel Mare, Mihai Eminescu, Constantin Motaș, Alexandra Nechita, Vasile Alecsandri, Mihail Sadoveanu.

The city also has six high schools, named after Mihail Kogălniceanu, Emil Racoviță, Anghel Rugină, Ștefan Procopiu and Ion Mincu, as well as a Sports High School.

== Economy ==
The main industries are textiles (clothing and knitted wear) and food (baked goods, vegetable oil, meat, dairy). There are also a number of shopping centers and supermarkets.

== Transport ==
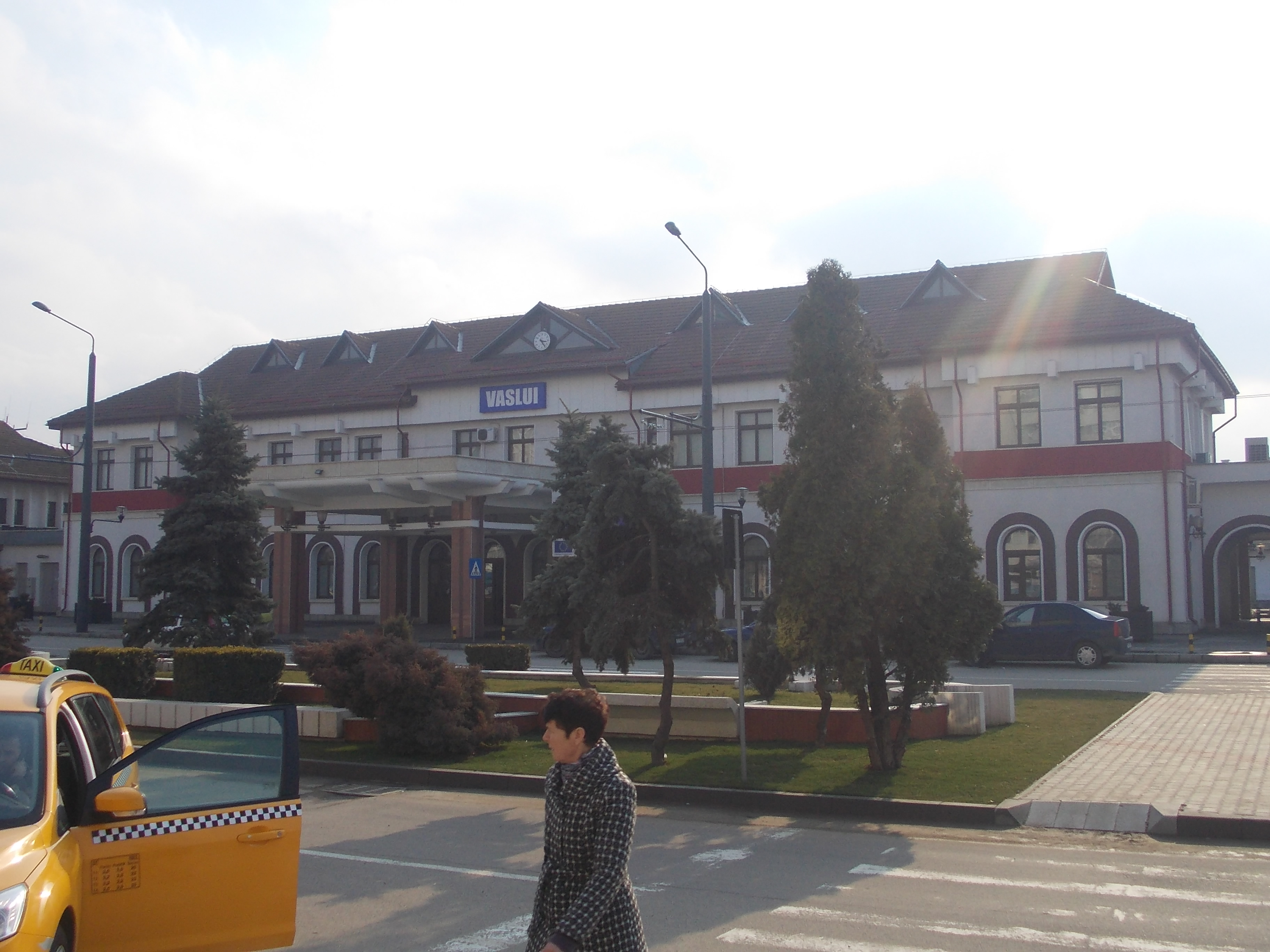
Train station

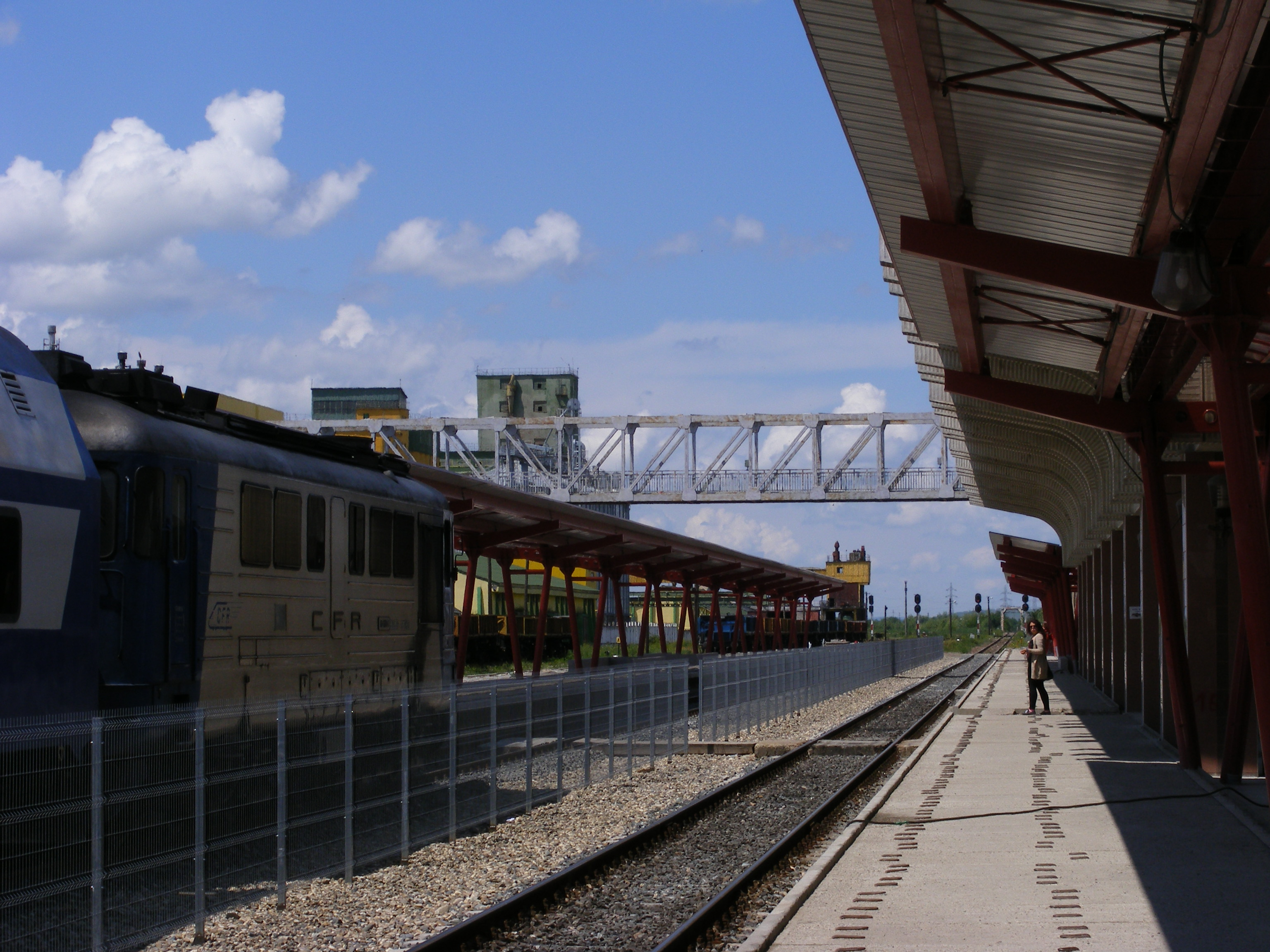
Train station

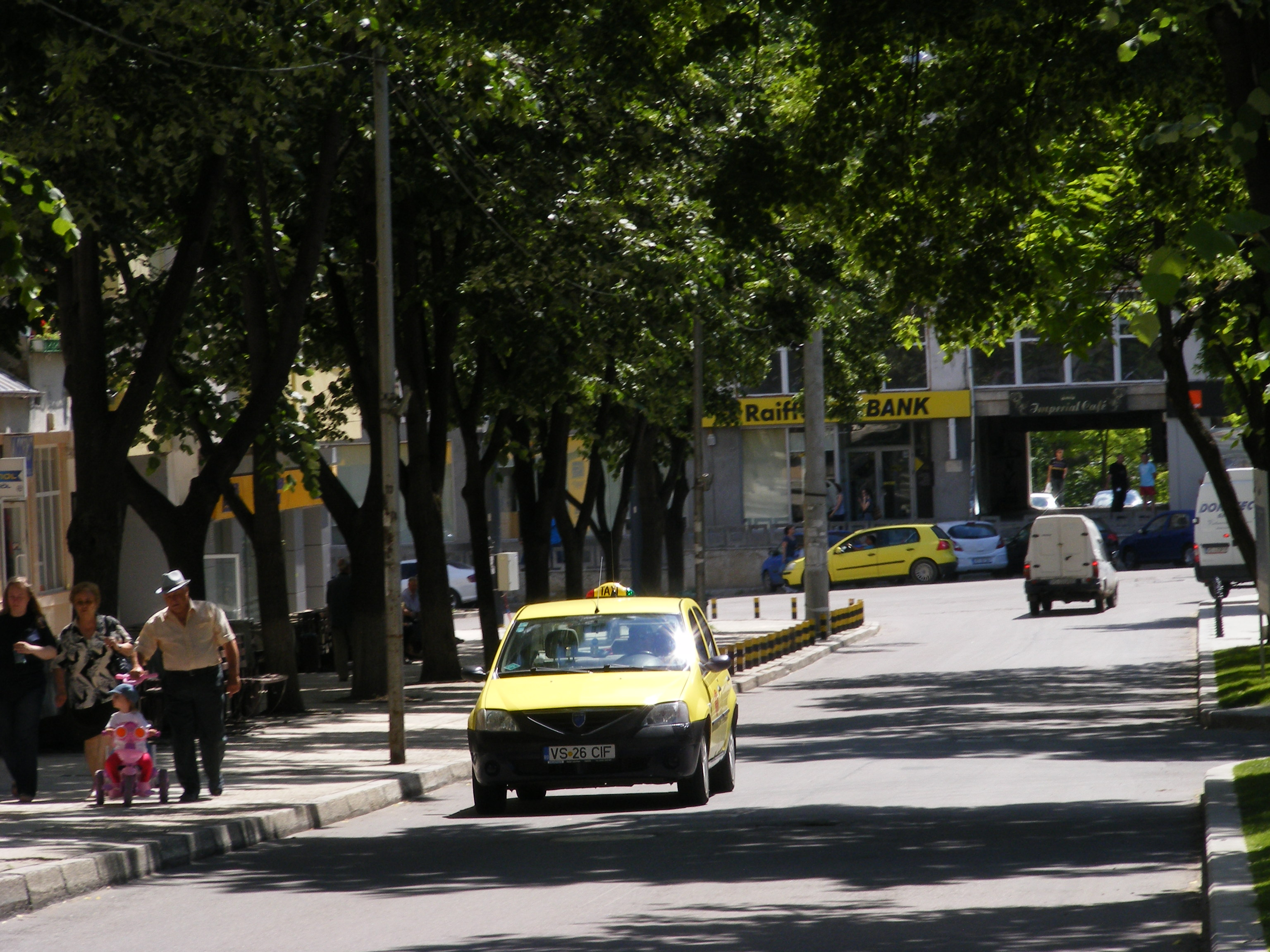

The Vaslui railway station is located in the south of the city. Originally designed by Anghel Saligny, it opened in 1886. The station was renovated in 2013.

In the city, public transport is provided by buses and taxis. In July 1994, a trolleybus line opened. It closed in July 2009, reopening in August 2016.

The DN24 national road passes through the city in a north-south direction (Iași-Bârlad). The DN2F road heads west to Bacău, and the DN15D road goes north-west to Piatra Neamț. European route E581 lies to the south-east.

== Sport ==
Vaslui is home to FC Vaslui football club which played in Liga I until 2014, and HC Vaslui handball club which are playing in Liga Națională.

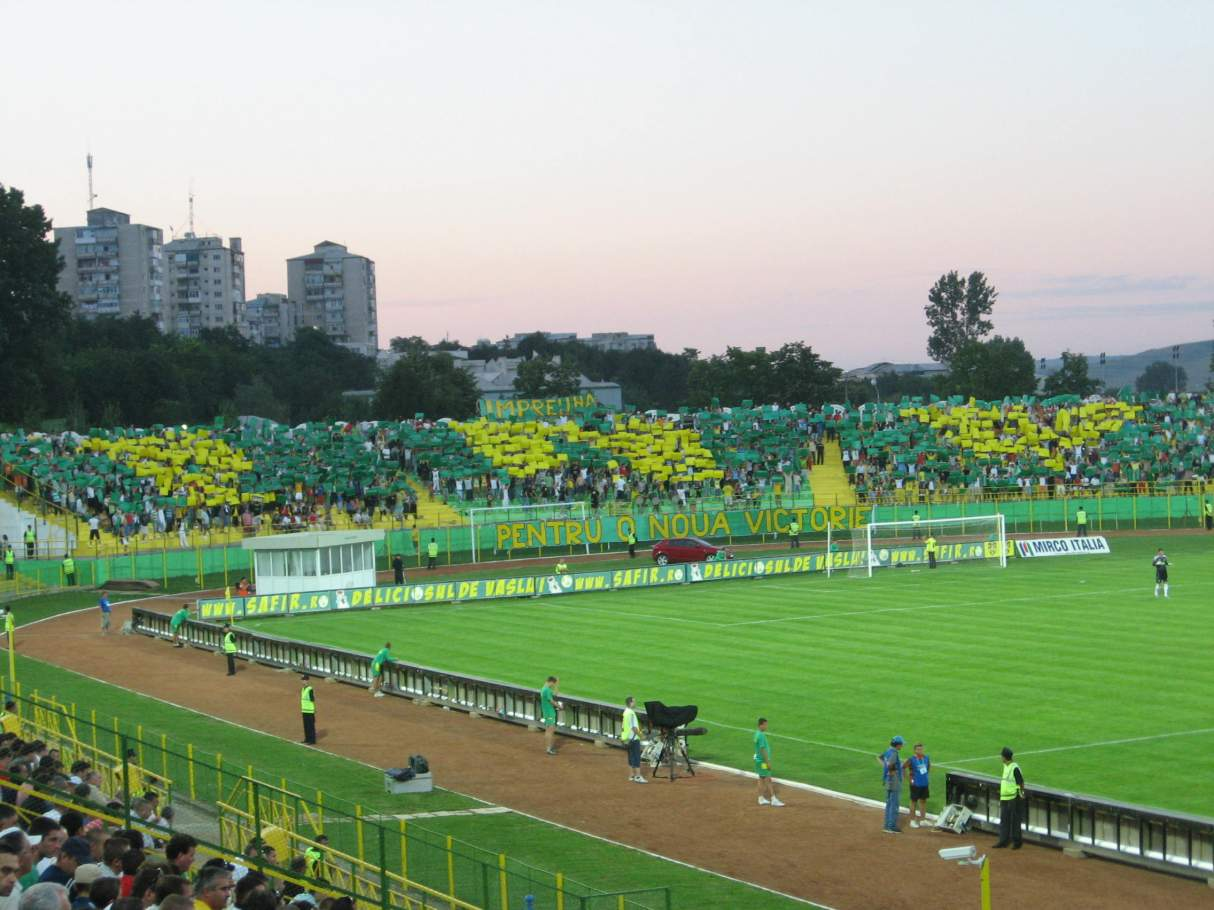
Municipal Stadium

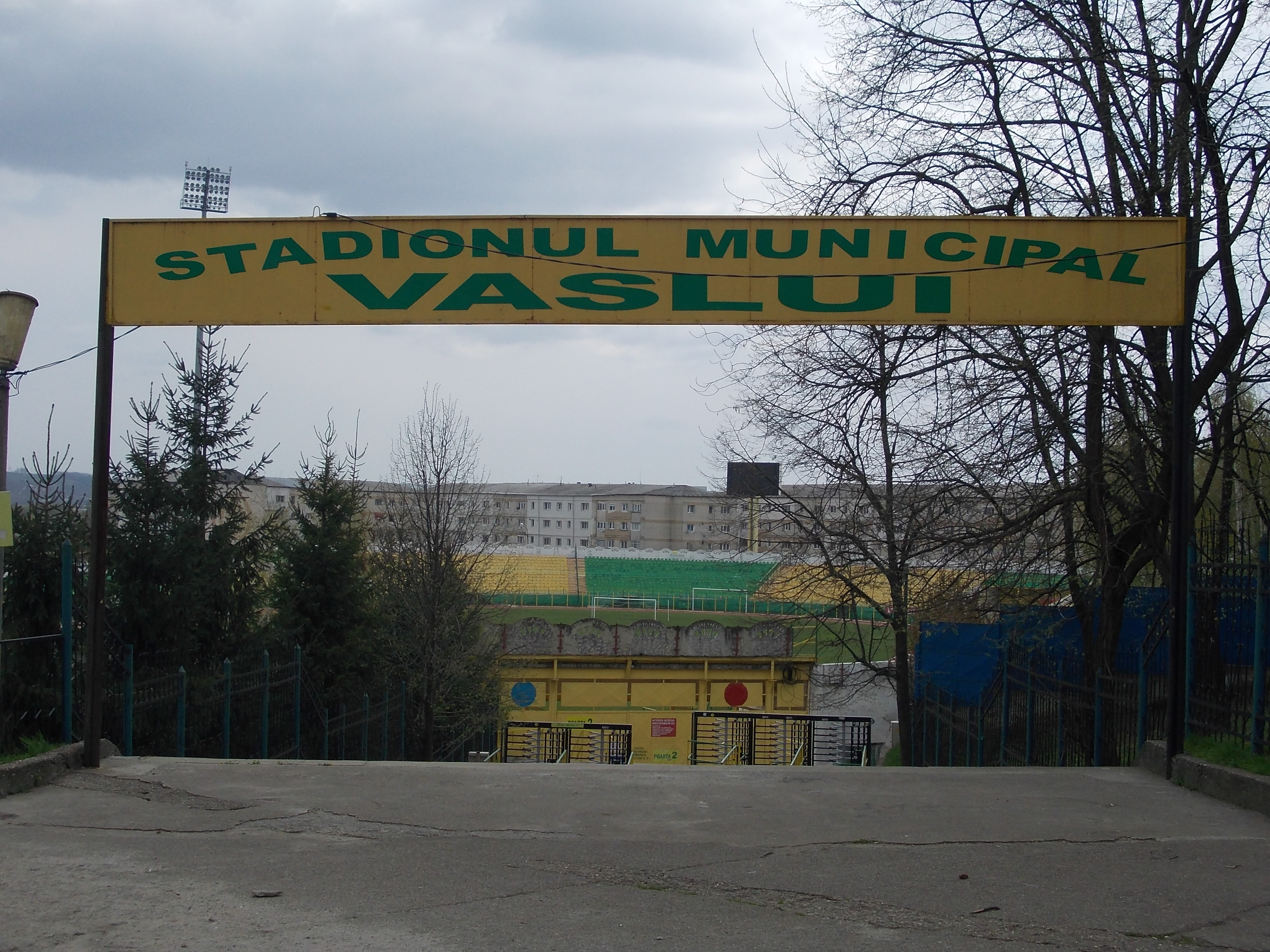
Municipal Stadium

== Natives ==
- Ioan Adam
- Viviana Gradinaru
- David M. Hermalin
- Lora (singer)
- Nicolae Milescu
- Gheorghe Mironescu
- Alexandra Nechita
- Alina Plugaru
- Corneliu Porumboiu
- Nikolai Spathari
- Constantin Tănase
- Marcela Topor
- Alexandra Cosma (EU Labor Law Researcher)

== Notable residents ==
- Marcus Eli Ravage

== Twin towns ==
Vaslui is twinned with:

- Cahul, Moldova
- Quarrata, Italy
- Radoviš, North Macedonia
- San Fernando de Henares, Spain

== Gallery ==
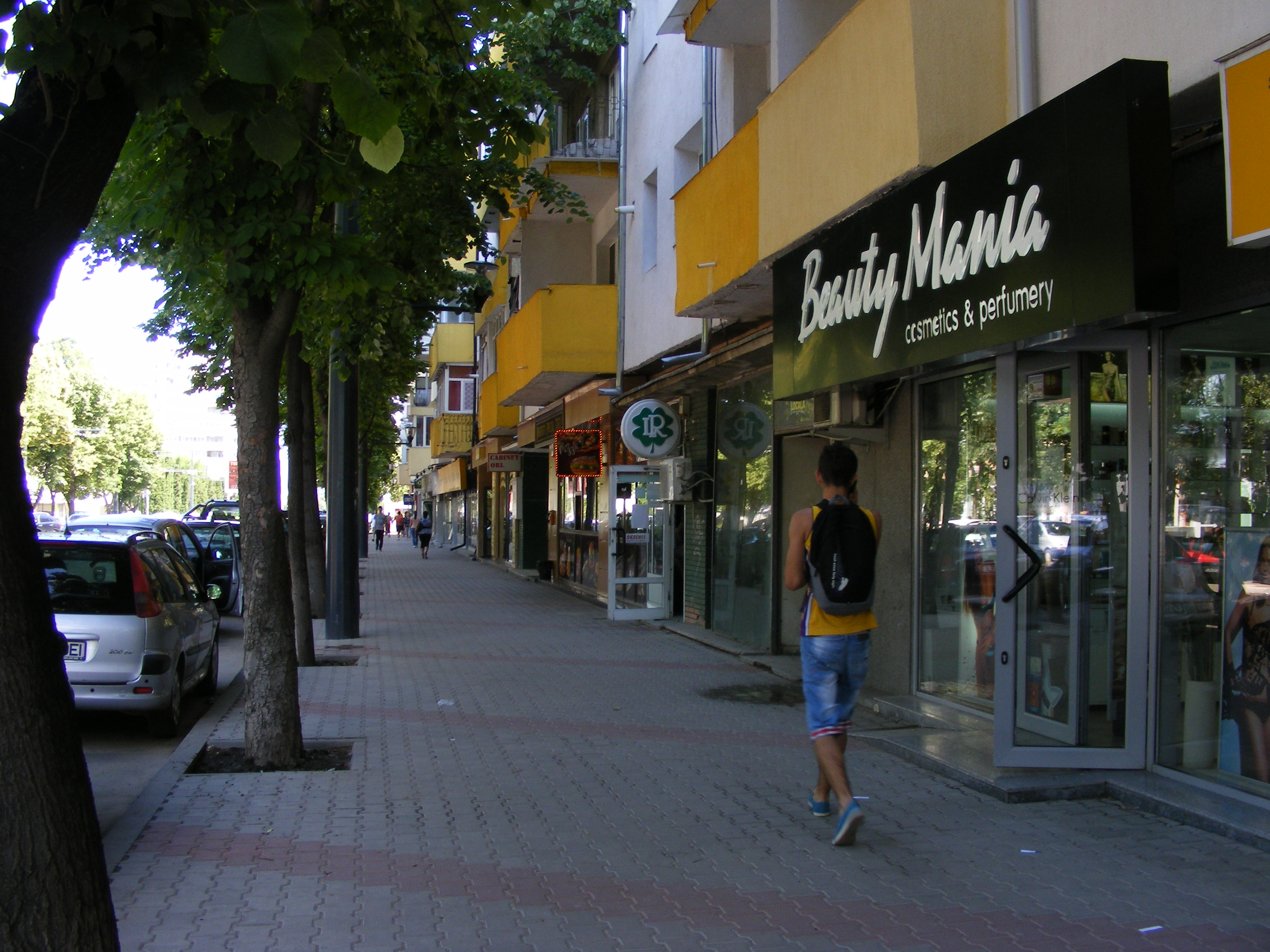

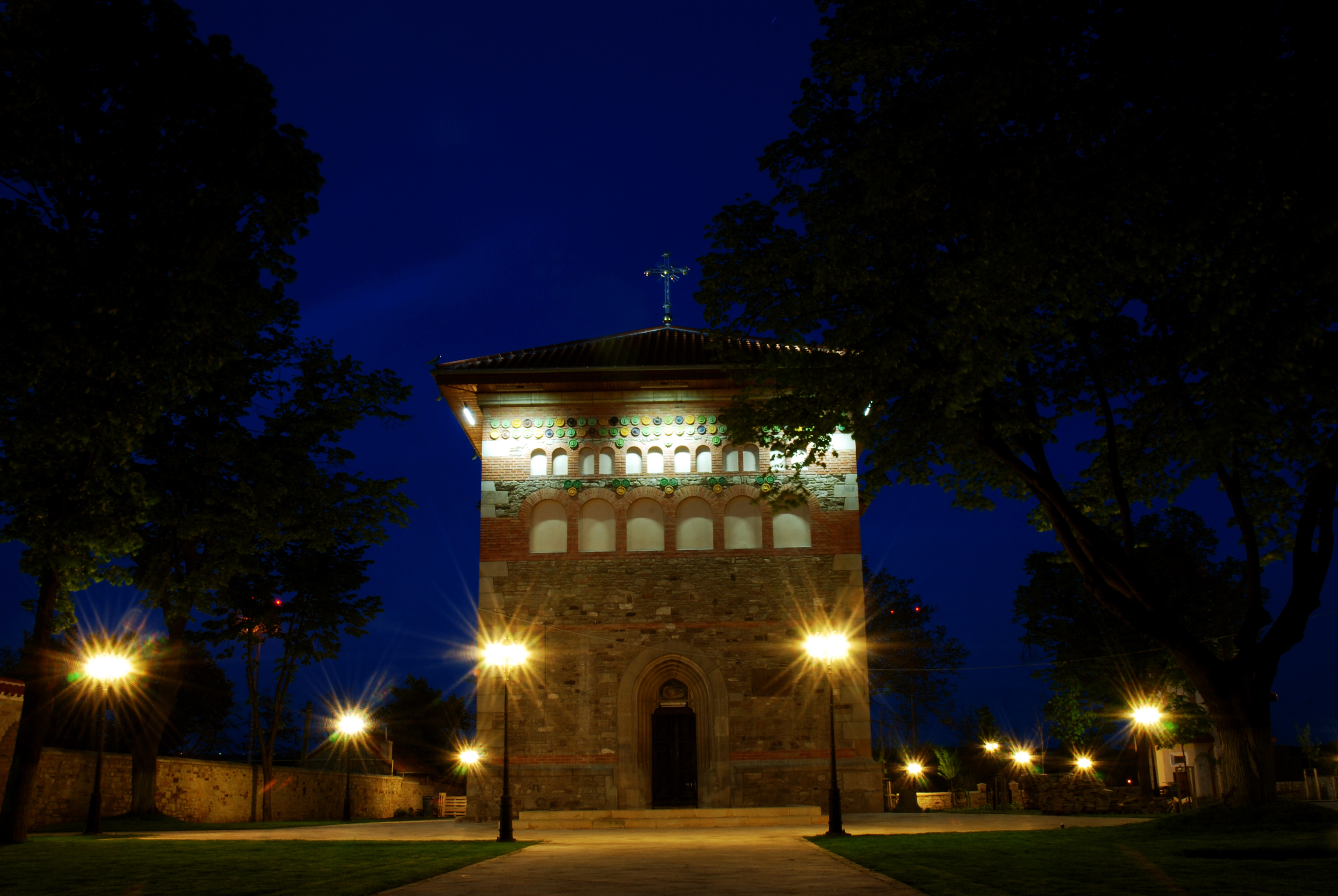
Princely Church

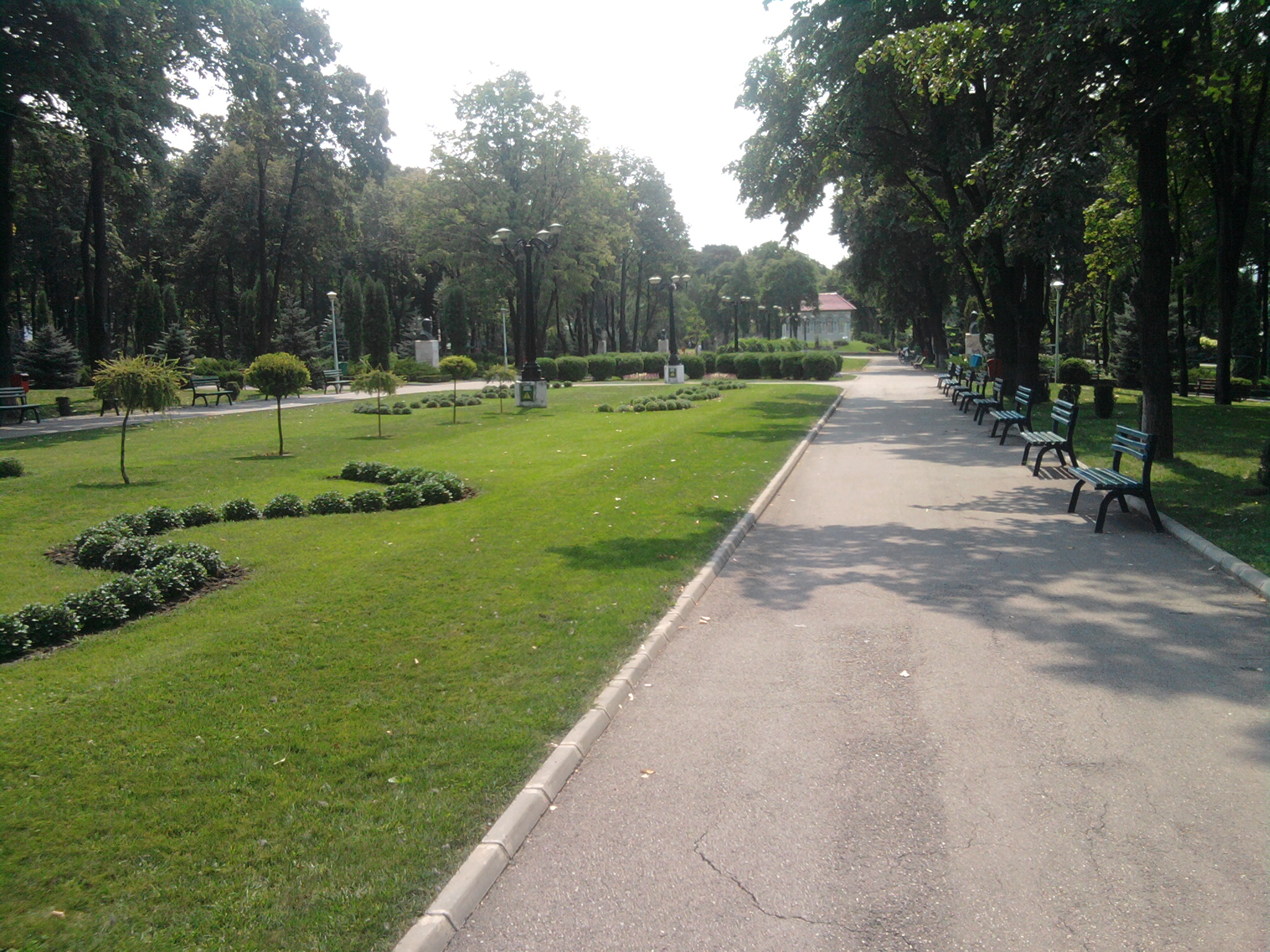
Copou Park

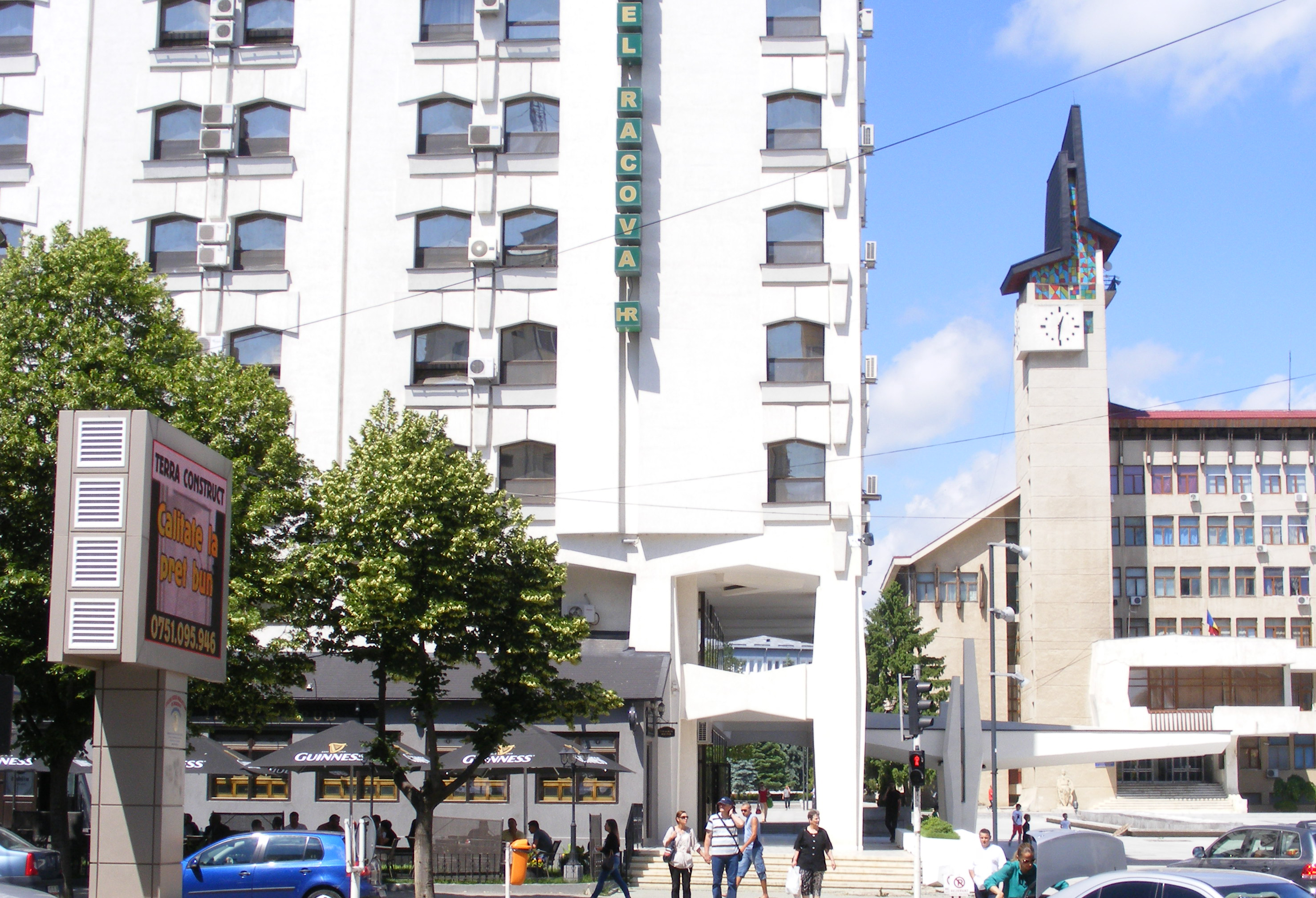
Civic Square

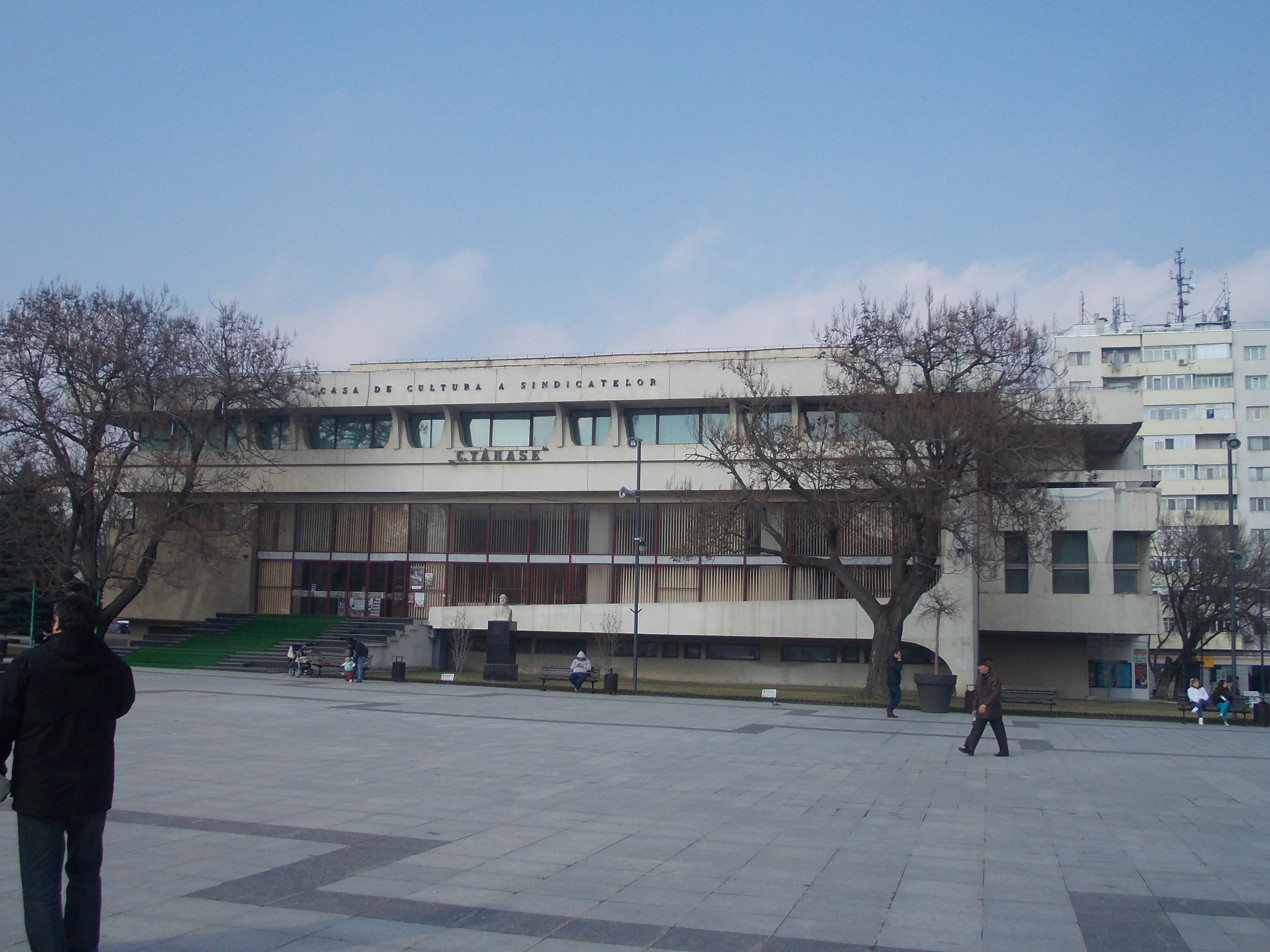
House of Culture

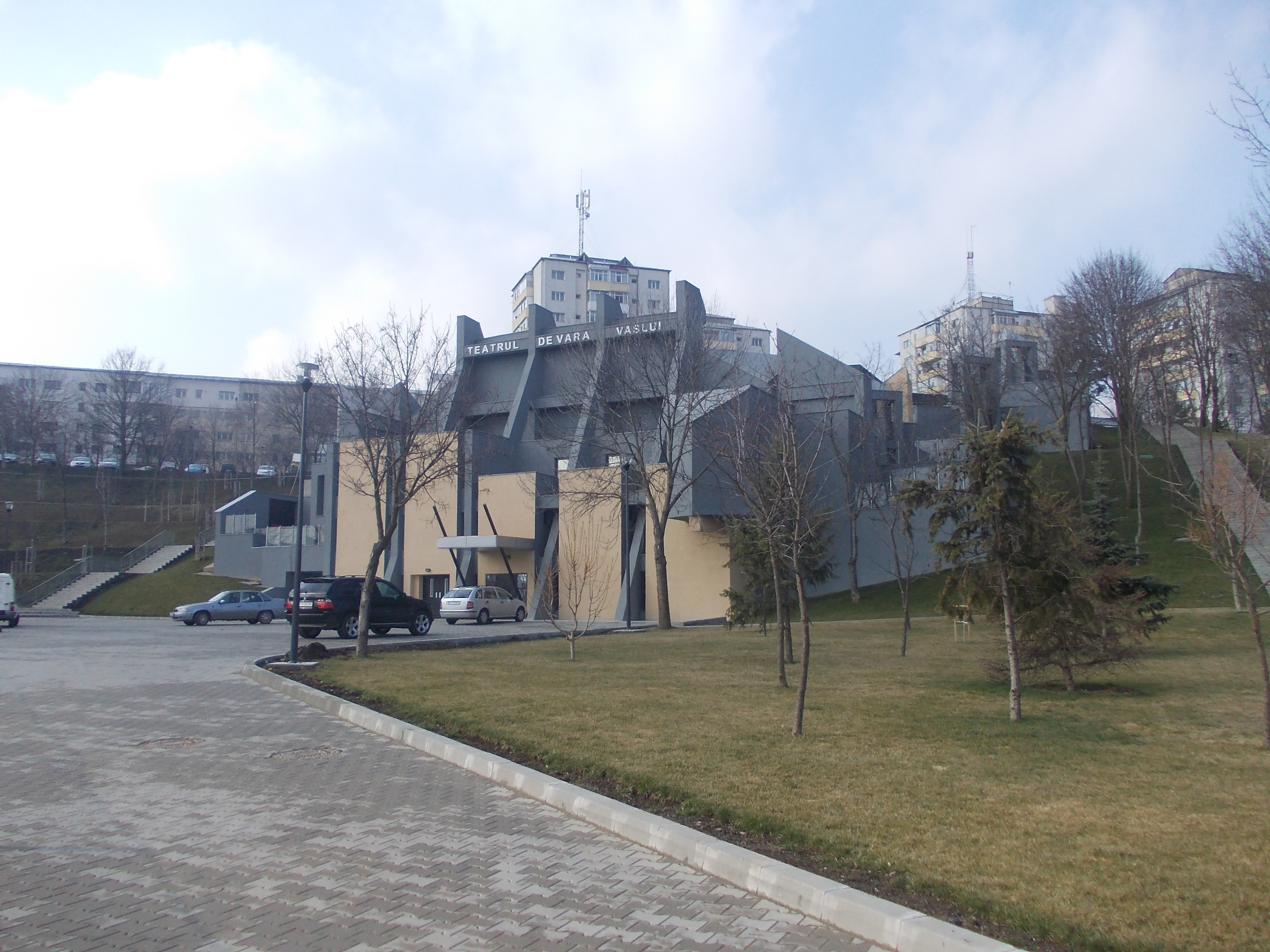
The Summer Theatre

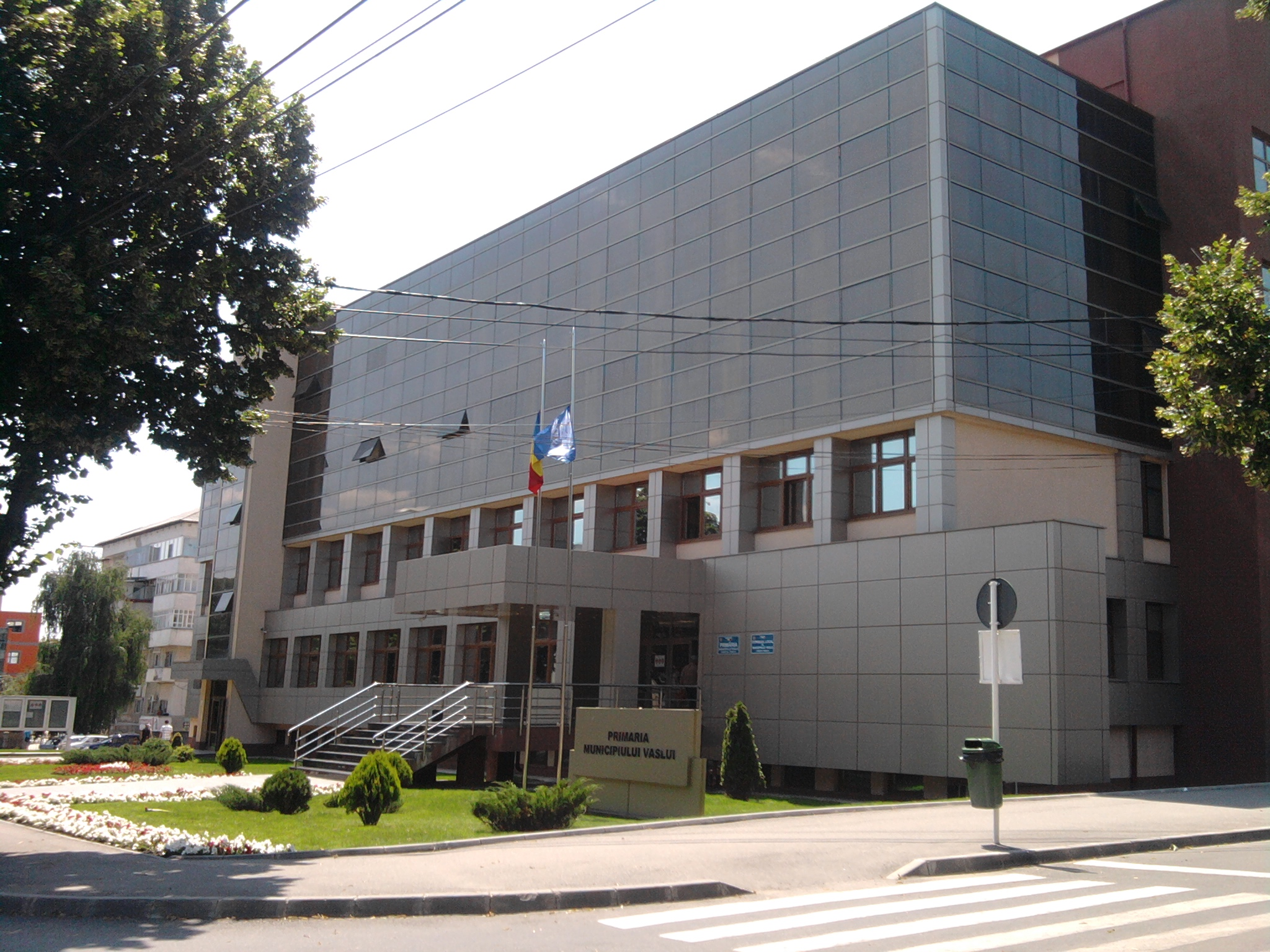
City Hall

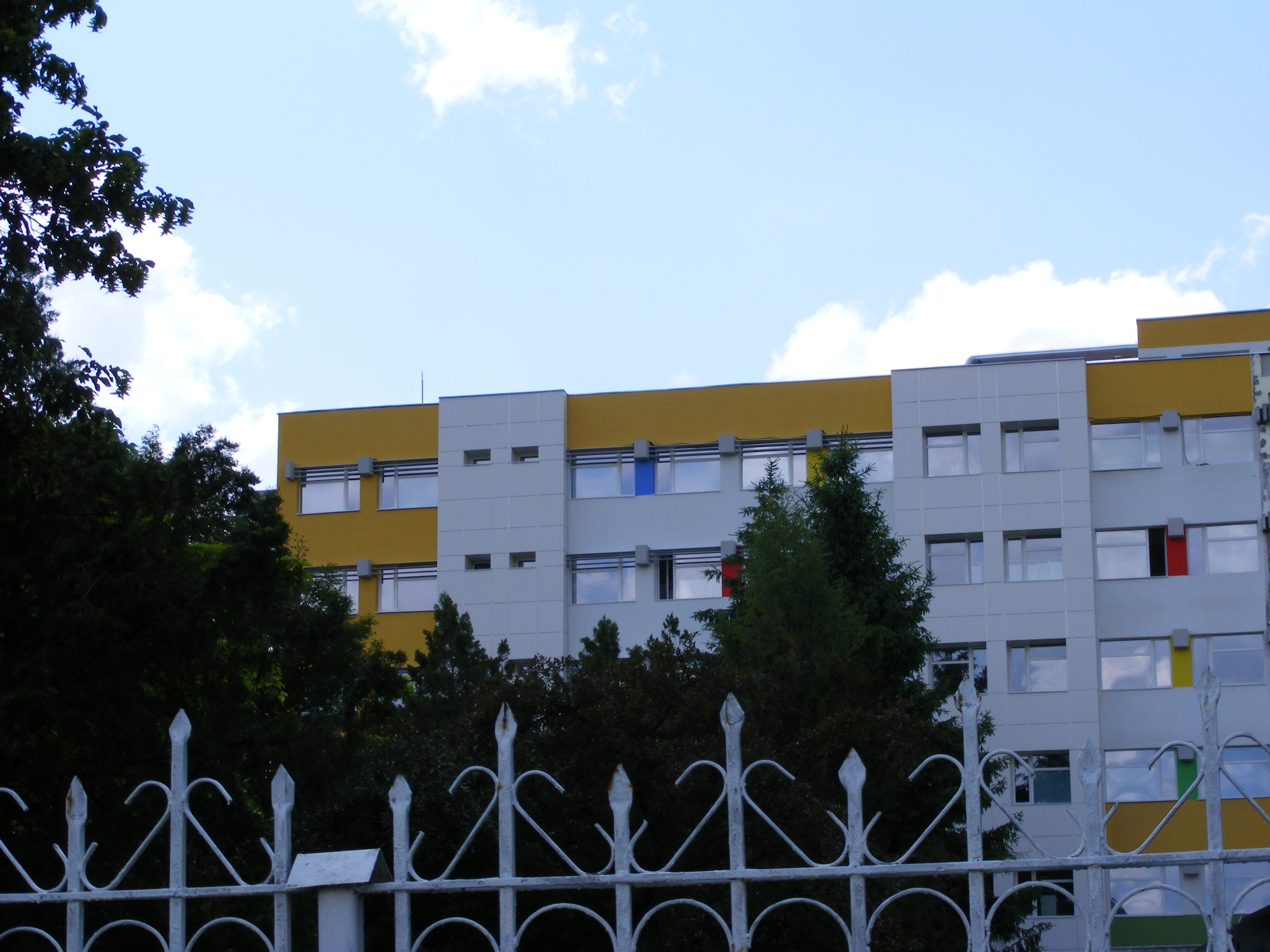
County Hospital

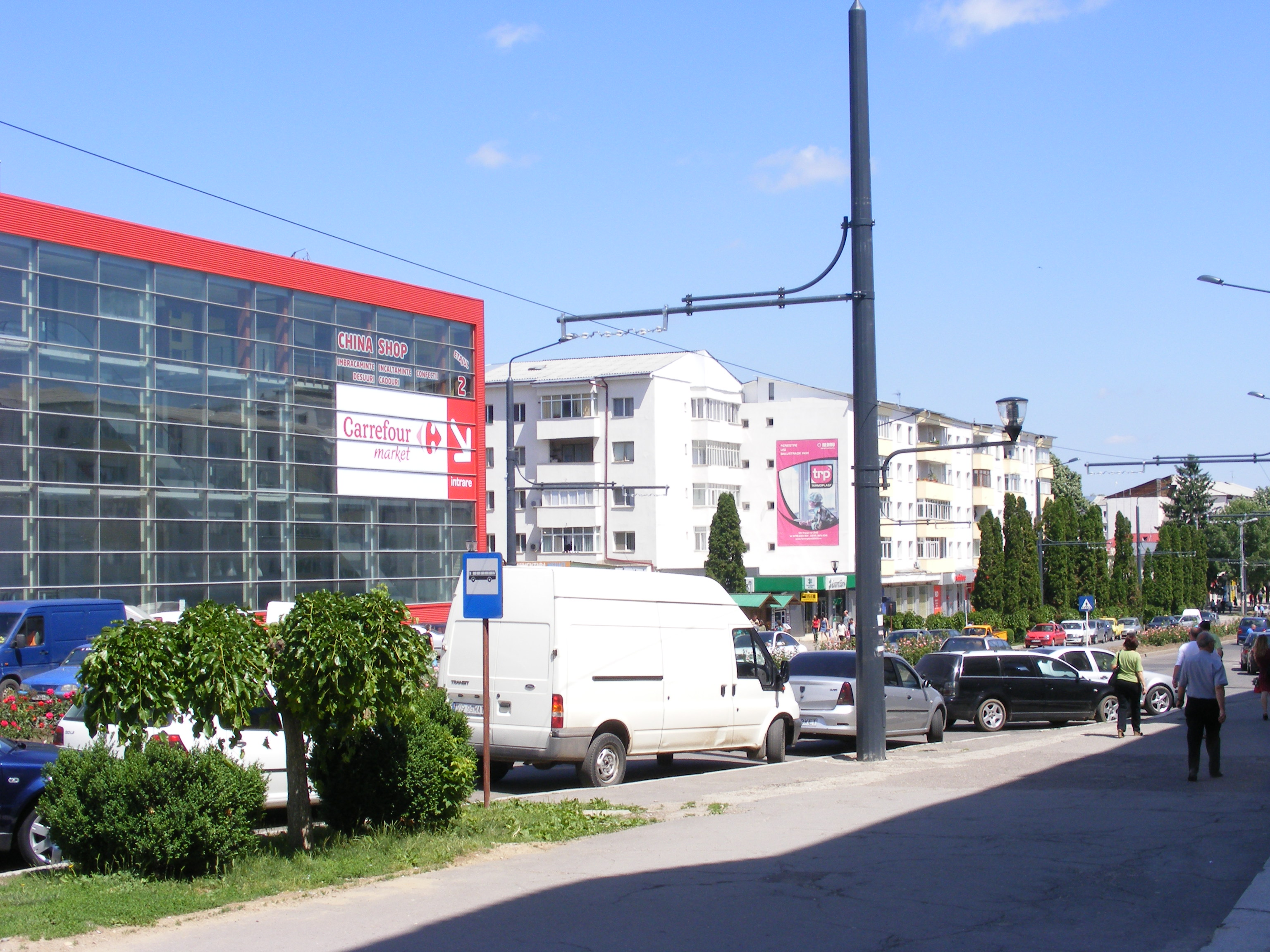
Central Mall (red)

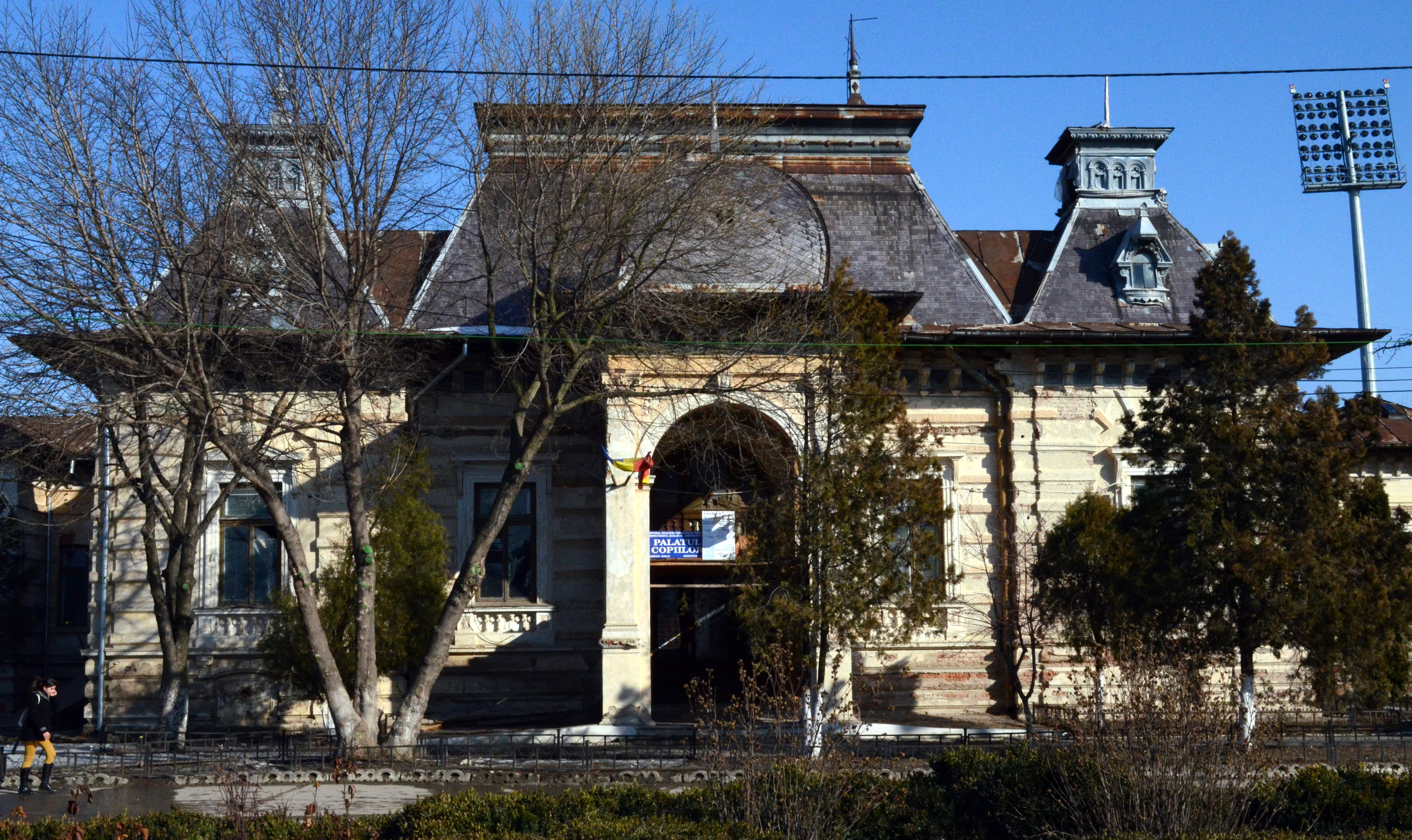
Mavrocordat Palace

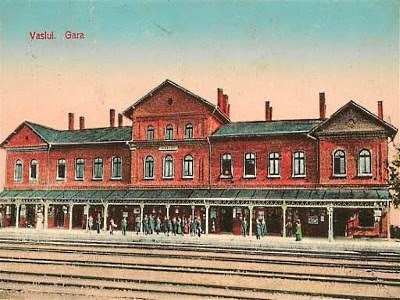
Old Railway Station

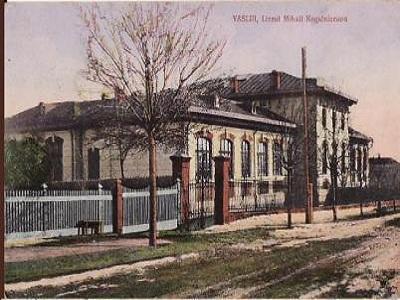
"Mihail Kogălniceanu" High School

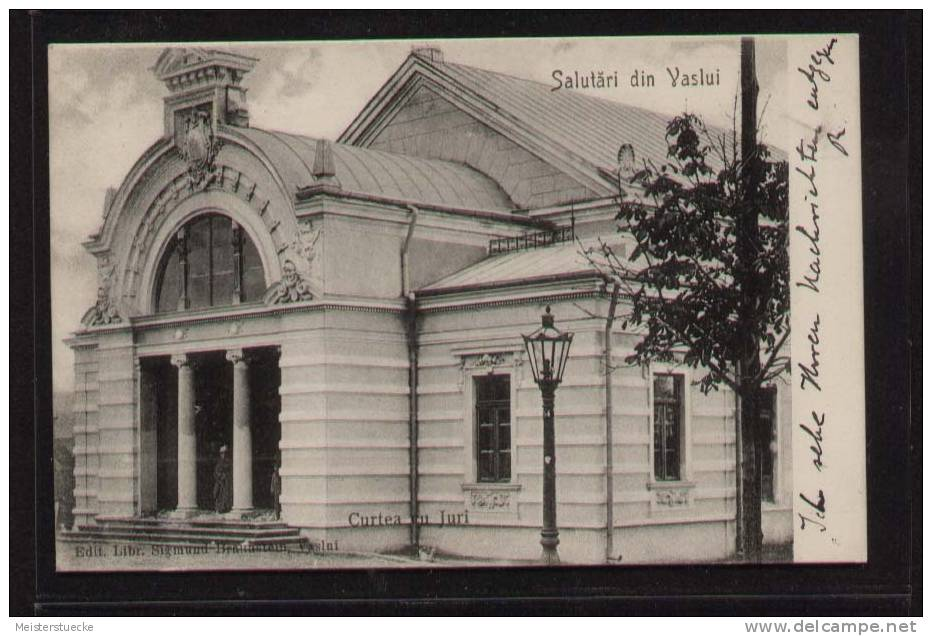
Courthouse (1907)
