= Ioan Adam =

Romanian judge (1875–1911)

Ioan Adam (November 26, 1875 – May 18, 1911) was a Romanian prose writer.

Born into a peasant family in Vaslui, he attended primary school in his native village, followed by Vasile Lupu Normal School in Iași. He then taught school in Cursești, Vaslui County. He studied law at the Free University of Brussels, obtaining a doctorate. He worked as a Romanian-language teacher in Constanța and as a magistrate in Călărași and Tulcea. Under the name I. Blanc, his first work appeared in Adevărul illustrat. He also published in the magazines Viața, Foaia pentru toți, Convorbiri Literare, Sămănătorul, Luceafărul, Făt-Frumos, Viața literară și artistică, Ramuri and Neamul românesc literar. In 1905, together with I. U. Soricu and Nicolae Dașcovici, he published the weekly Tribuna Dobrogei. He authored a number of Sămănătorist short story collections and novels, including Flori de câmp (1900), Rătăcire (1902) and Sybaris (1902). He translated Guy de Maupassant, significantly reducing the amount of violence from the original. His useful monograph Constanța pitorească (1908) is in the spirit of Alexandru Vlahuță. He died in Iași.
