= Diocese of Siret =

Bishopric in medieval Moldavia

Diocese of Siret Dioecesis Ceretensis

Location
- Territory: Moldavia
- Ecclesiastical province: Lwów

Information
- Denomination: Roman Catholic
- Sui iuris church: Latin Church
- Rite: Latin Rite
- Established: 1371
- Dissolved: 1515

The Roman Catholic Diocese of Siret was a Latin bishopric in medieval Moldavia.

== Antecedents ==
Since the 13th century, missionaries of the mendicant orders, Franciscans and Dominicans, created several Latin Catholic communities in present Romania, for whom the Holy See decided to created bishoprics, south and east of the Carpathians (in Walachia and Moldavia), generally short-lived, like the Diocese of Siret / Seret / Cereten(sis) (Latin adjective), established in 1371.

Catholicism was on the rise among the traditionally Orthodox population due to the political late 14th century context, as the Ottoman advance, nearly encircling the imperial capital Constantinople (conquering (H)Adrianopolis, now Edirne, in 1360), the Byzantine emperors sought a political and hopefully military ally in the Catholic west, which had crusaded against Islam to and in the Middle East before.

Similarly in Moldavia, where Bogdan I obtained virtual independence in 1359 as founding voivode (autonomous prince), seeking aid and protection from Poland, welcomed Latin missionaries, Franciscan Friars Minor (founding a monastery at Siret in 1340) and Dominicans.

== History ==
Bogdan's son and indirect successor Lațcu of Moldavia (1365-1373) invited a delegation from Rome, promising his and the people's conversion to Catholicism and asked Pope Urban V to send missionaries and erect a Latin diocese in his principality's capital, Siret. On 24 July 1370 the Pope instructed the archbishop of Prague and bishops of Bratislava and Kraków to verify/complete the sincerity of Laţcu (although his wife remained Orthodox) and mandated them to erect such diocese covering the Moldavian state. Pope Gregory XI established it in 1371, exempt (i.e. directly subject to the Holy See); Polish Franciscan Andrzej Jastrzębiec was consecrated first Bishop by archbishop Florian Mokrski of Kraków. The cathedral, dedicated to John the Baptist, was built by queen Margareth, Catholic kin of the Hungarian royal family, which in 1377 had invited Dominicans to Siret.

However prince Laţcu favoring of Catholicism met grave opposition from the Orthodox clergy, while effective Latin converts were concentrated in the north of Moldavia, near Catholic neighbour kingdoms of Poland and Hungary. Since 1372, when Andrzej was nominated Apostolic administrator of the Archdiocese of Halyč, probably never returning to Siret, he and his (all Polish) successors resided more in Poland then in Moldavia. In 1388 prince Petru (Peter) II "Muşat" (1375–1391) transferred the Moldavian voivode's capital from Siret to Suceava, thus contributing to the crisis in the diocese of Siret, now abandoned by both crown and episcopate.

Exempt Bishops of Siret

(all Roman Rite)

- Andrzej Jastrzębiec, Friars Minor (O.F.M.) (1371.05.09 – 1388.03.12), next Bishop of Vilnius (Lithuania) (1388.03.12 – death 1398.11.14)
- Jan I Sartorius (1388 – death 1394)
- Stefan Martini, Dominican Order (O.P.) (1394.06.08 – death 1412.01.10), reminded by the Pope he could not celebrate pontifical masses outside his diocese, but in 1396 nominated Auxiliary bishop of Kraków, maintaining his title as Ordinary of Siret.

At the 1412 erection of the Latin Metropolitan Archbishopric of Lwów in Poland (now in Ukraine), Siret became its suffragan (no longer exempt).

Suffragan Bishops of Siret

- In 1413, due to the Western Schism ('Babylonian exile' of Antipopes in Avignon, 1378 to 1417), two rival bishops were appointed:
  - Mikołaj (Nicholas) Venatoris, Augustinians (O.E.S.A.) (1413.03.05 – ?1434)
  - [uncanonical?] Tomasz Grueber (1413.07.31 – ?)
- Jan II (1420.09.04 – 1422?) - according to a Vatican archive document found by Eubel, who doubts its authenticity
- Jan III, O.F.M. (1434.01.29 – ?).

The diocese of Siret was effectively suppressed, but from circa 1418, the Holy See erected another Moldavian bishopric, the Diocese of Baia, which inherited its territory (1434?).

== See also ==
- List of Catholic dioceses in Romania

== Sources and external links ==
- (in Romanian) Siret Town Hall official site
- [GCatholic - former Latin Catholic bishopric]
- (in Romanian) Siret unofficial site
- (in Romanian) Suceava County site - Siret web page
- (in Romanian) Photo Gallery - Old photos of Siret

Bibliography

- Konrad Eubel, Hierarchia Catholica Medii Aevi, vol. 1, p. 182; vol. 2, p. 125
- Emil Dumea, Il cattolicesimo nella Moldavia-Romania nel XVIII secolo, doctoiral dissertation, Rome 1997, pp. 52–55
- Emil Dumea, Istoria Bisericii Catolice din Moldova, Iași 2005, pp. 32–39
- E. Jean, lemma 'Ceretum', in Dictionnaire d'Histoire et de Géographie ecclésiastiques, vol. XII, Paris 1953, coll. 165-169
