= Alexandra Nechita =

Romanian-American painter

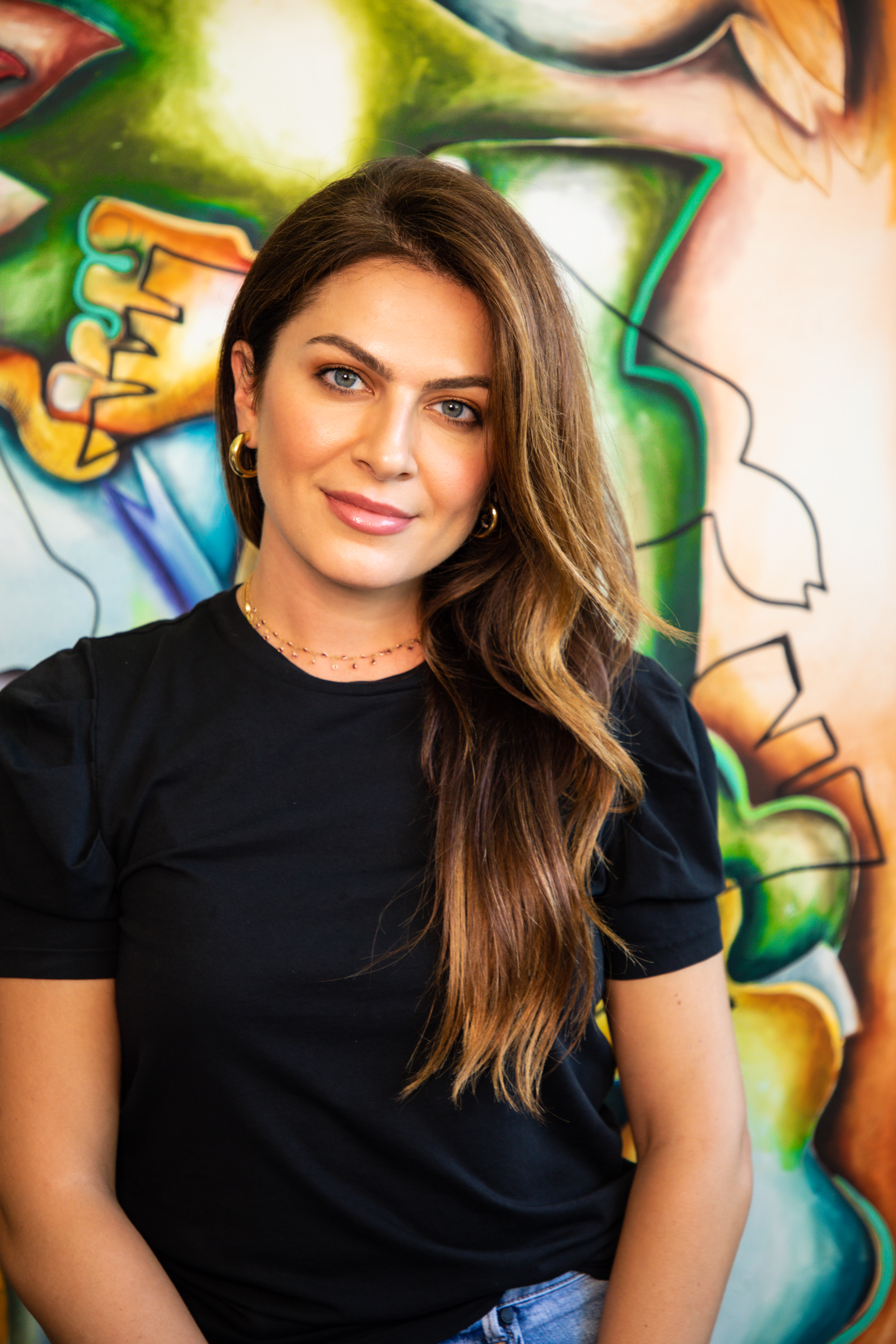
- Nechita in 2020
- Born: August 27, 1985 (age 41); Vaslui, Romania
- Education: University of California, Los Angeles
- Movement: Cubism
- Spouse: Dimitry Tcharfas (m. 2014)
- Children: 2

Alexandra Nechita (born August 27, 1985) is a Romanian-American cubist painter and philanthropist. At age 12 she was dubbed the "Petite Picasso" by the media and the art community. She has been praised for her paintings and vision of art.

== Early life and education ==
Nechita was born in Vaslui, three months after her father, Niki, escaped from Communist Romania. She and her mother, Viorica, had to wait two years before they were allowed to join him in the United States. The family settled in California, where her father found work as a lab technician and her mother as an office manager.

At the age of two, she was working with pen and ink, and by five with watercolors. By her seventh birthday, oil and acrylics were her tools. She had her first solo exhibition at age eight, at the public library in Whittier, Los Angeles County. At the time, she was a student at Orange Lutheran High School, a private school in Orange County. In 1995, at the age of ten, Nechita was taken to Paris to work at the Mourlot Studios. In the same year, she became the youngest artist to sign with International Art Publishers. When Nechita graduated, she gave her teachers a special painting that she had painted.

== Career ==
By early 1996 Nechita had already delivered 16 solo exhibits of her paintings, and "at least $1.5 million in sales." Nechita came to national attention in early 1997, when she was chosen to design the 39th Annual Grammy Awards Program. Nechita has been a guest on The Oprah Winfrey Show and has appeared with numerous celebrities, including Bill Clinton. In addition to talk show appearances, she has played herself on the teen sitcom Boy Meets World in the 1998 episode "Better Than The Average Cory". Her talent and perceived similarities to Pablo Picasso led to her being known as the "Petite Picasso. She was known as a child prodigy until late in her teens, and routinely sold her paintings for $100,000 or more.

In November 1999, Nechita was selected by the World Federation of United Nations Associations to lead a Global Arts Initiative involving more than 100 nations. In 2005, Alexandra Nechita unveiled her United Nations Peace Monument for Asia in Singapore, to be displayed at the Catholic High School. Her artwork has been sold and displayed at various locations in the world and her collectors include Ellen DeGeneres, Alec Baldwin, Oprah Winfrey, Melissa Etheridge, Lee Iacocca, Calvin Klein, Whoopi Goldberg, Little Richard and Paul Stanley of the rock group Kiss. The theatre at her high school, Lutheran High School of Orange County is named after her.

Nechita is on the Board of Selectors of Jefferson Awards for Public Service.

== Media ==
Nechita was interviewed by CNN's Nicole Lapin on the series Young People Who Rock in November 2007. She has appeared on television news and talk shows around the world, including NBC's Today Show, The Oprah Winfrey Show, NBC Nightly News and CBS Sunday Morning. She also made an appearance in an episode of ABC's Boy Meets World. She has received numerous awards and honors which include Outstanding Artist of the Year (Lincoln Center for Arts New York); Most Fascinating Woman of the Year (Ladies' Home Journal in conjunction with CBS TV); Outstanding Young person Award (Osaka, Japan); and Woman of the Year by the American Red Cross.

== Personal life ==
She graduated from UCLA in 2008 with a degree in Fine Arts and currently lives in Los Angeles. In January 2014, she married longtime boyfriend Dimitry Tcharfas. She has a daughter and a son.
