= Trolleybuses in Vaslui =

Transit system in Vaslui, Romania

Vaslui trolleybus system
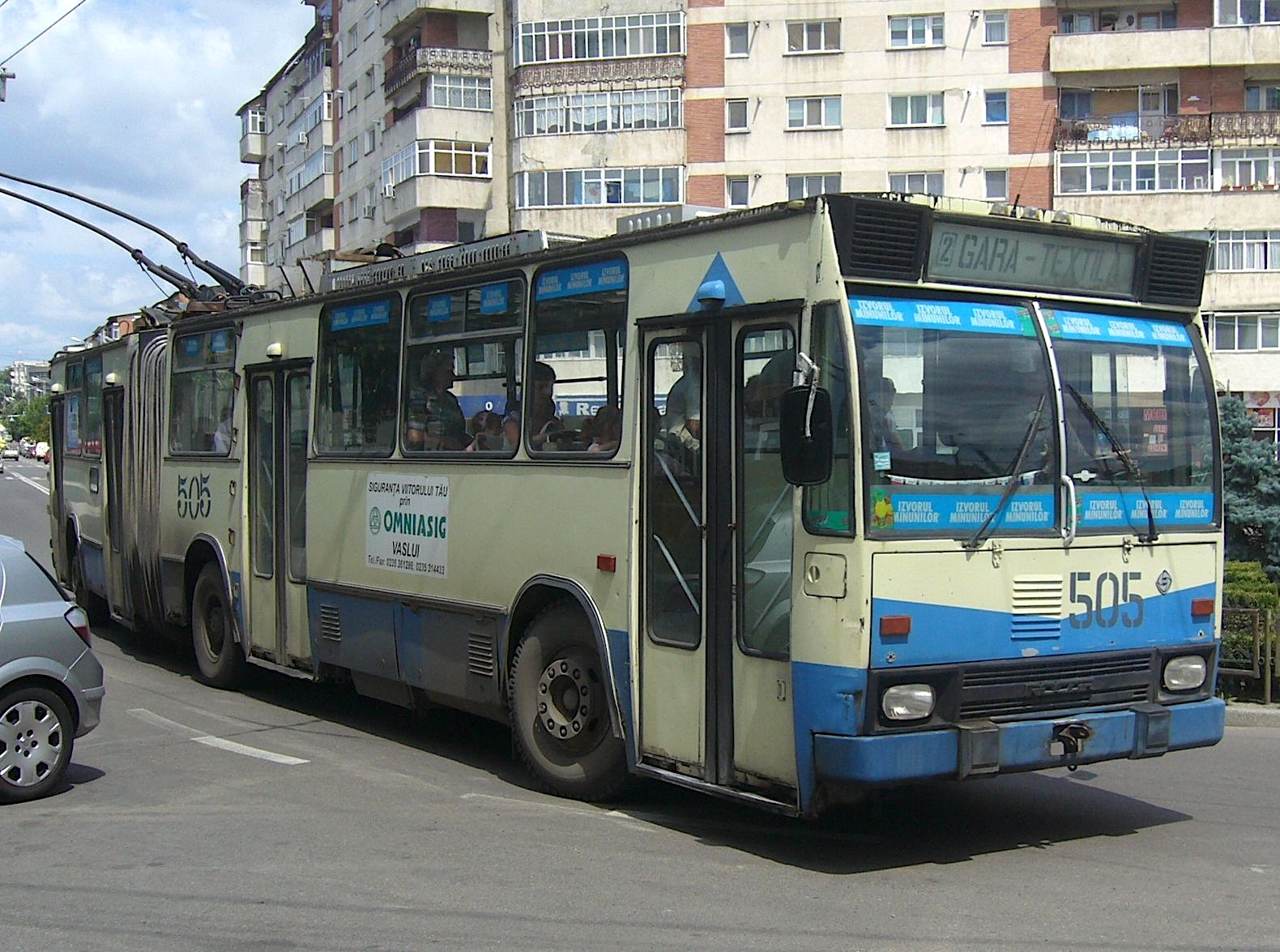
- A Rocar trolleybus, a type now withdrawn, arriving at Vaslui railway station in 2008

Operation
- Locale: Vaslui, Romania
- Open: 1 May 1994; 32 years ago
- Routes: 1
- Operators: RAGCL (1994–1999); Transurb SA (since 1999)

Infrastructure
- Electrification: (750) V DC parallel overhead lines
- Stock: 10

Statistics
- Route length: 6.5 km (4.0 mi)
- Website: Official website

The Vaslui trolleybus system is a one route trolleybus network in the Romanian city of Vaslui.

The original 4.4 km (2.7 mi) network opened on 1 May 1994 and was operated by a fleet of five new Rocar 217E articulated trolleybuses. It closed on 7 July 2009. Construction on a depot commenced, but was never finished with buses being serviced on the street.

In August 2016, the overhead wiring was extended by 2 km (1.2 mi) and the line reopened with the help of a European Union grant. Three Gräf & Stift GE112 M16 articulated trolleybuses were purchased secondhand from Salzburg. The system was soon closed again due to the poor state of infrastructure, low usage, and lack of personnel. It was then decided to acquire new modern trolleybuses, with low floors, air-conditioning and various comfort features.

In 2021, 10 new trolleybuses were ordered from the Polish manufacturer Solaris. In 2023, between January and March, all 10 trolleybuses were delivered. The model is Solaris Trollino 12M, and the vehicles were painted light green. Before they could be placed into service, training of personnel (drivers, maintenance mechanics, etc.), various garage modifications and after some revisions of the overhead network and power supply needed to be undertaken. On 4 August 2023, the system was reopened.
