= David M. Hermalin =

American novelist

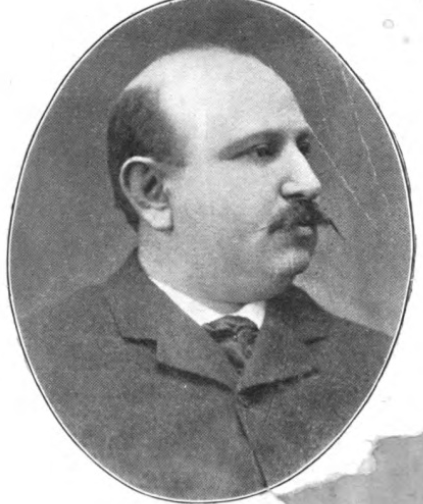

David Moses Hermalin (May 12, 1865 – June 19, 1921) was a Romanian-born Jewish American Yiddish writer, journalist, newspaper editor, and playwright.

== Life ==
Hermalin was born on May 12, 1865, in Vaslui, Romania to a commercial family. His father was Abraham Abba Hermalin.

The son of a merchant, Hermalin received a traditional education at a cheder until he was twelve. He then studied secular subjects and learned Hebrew, Russian, German and French from his teacher Hillel Goldenkorn. He moved to Bucharest when he was sixteen and lived there for four years. He worked as a journalist for Romanian newspapers in Bucharest, but was compelled to leave for protesting against Jewish persecution. He immigrated to America in 1885 and began writing for the Nyu Yorker Yudishe Folkstsaytung when it was founded in 1886. He spent a year working as a Hebrew teacher in Montreal, Canada, after which he returned to New York City and worked as a journalist full-time. He became an important contributor and co-editor of various Yiddish newspapers like Folks Advokat, Idishe Herald, Varhayt, and Der Tog. One source described him as the most important family page editor in Yiddish for many years.

Hermalin wrote novels and treatises on popular philosophy. He made a number of loose Yiddish translations of European literature, including the works of Leo Tolstoy, Émile Zola, Guy de Maupassant, Boccaccio, Arthur Conan Doyle, and Jonathan Swift. In 1895, he rewrote the Shakespearean plays Julius Caesar and Macbeth into Yiddish, which were then staged as Yiddish plays. He then adopted other plays into Yiddish theater, including Coriolanus, Goethe's Faust, Strindberg’s The Father, and Hauptmann’s Elga, and created his own plays. He also wrote a Hebrew pamphlet on the Jews and the Freemasons as well as an English article on Romanian Jews in America. A passionate huntsman and fisherman, he wrote about his adventures in Yiddish.

Hermalin was married to Henrietta Lustgarten.

Hermalin died at his home in Baldwin on June 19, 1921. His funeral took place in the offices of Der Tog. He was buried in Mount Lebanon Cemetery.
