= George Koriatovich =

- Duke of Podolia

Voivode of Moldavia
- Reign: 1374 – 1375-1377
- Predecessor: Laţcu
- Successor: Peter I Mușat
- Born: after 1330
- Died: 1375-1377
- Dynasty: Gediminid dynasty
- Father: Karijotas

George Koriatovich, also known as George Korjatowicz or Jurg Korjat (Polish: Jerzy Koriatowicz) (after 1330 – 1375-1377), was a Lithuanian prince from the Gediminid dynasty. He was prince of Podolia (now in Ukraine) together with his two brothers from around 1363. George closely cooperated with Casimir III of Poland against his Lithuanian kinsmen who had absorbed parts of the Kingdom of Galicia–Volhynia. He was elected voivode of Moldavia in 1374, but his Vlach subjects murdered him in 1375 or 1377.

== Early life ==
George Koriatovich was the oldest son of the Lithuanian prince Karijotas. Karijotas inherited Novgorodok (now Navahrudak in Belarus) from his father, Gediminas, Grand Duke of Lithuania, in late 1341 or early 1342. Karijotas adopted Orthodoxy and was baptised Michael. For Karijotas was born in about 1310, his sons must have been born after 1330, according historian Paul W. Knoll.

The Lithuanians invaded the Kingdom of Galicia–Volhynia in late August 1350. They captured significant territories, which were distributed among the Lithuanian princes. The towns of Chełm and Vladimir were given to one George who was probably identical with George Koriatovich, according to Knoll. Casimir III of Poland acknowledged the rule of the Lithuanian princes, including George, in the lands that they had occupied in a treaty signed in 1352. George and his brother, Alexander, came into conflict with their uncles, Kęstutis and Liubartas, in the early 1360s. George and Alexander were expelled from their lands around 1362. They fled to Poland where they settled in Casimir III's court.

== Podolia and Moldavia ==
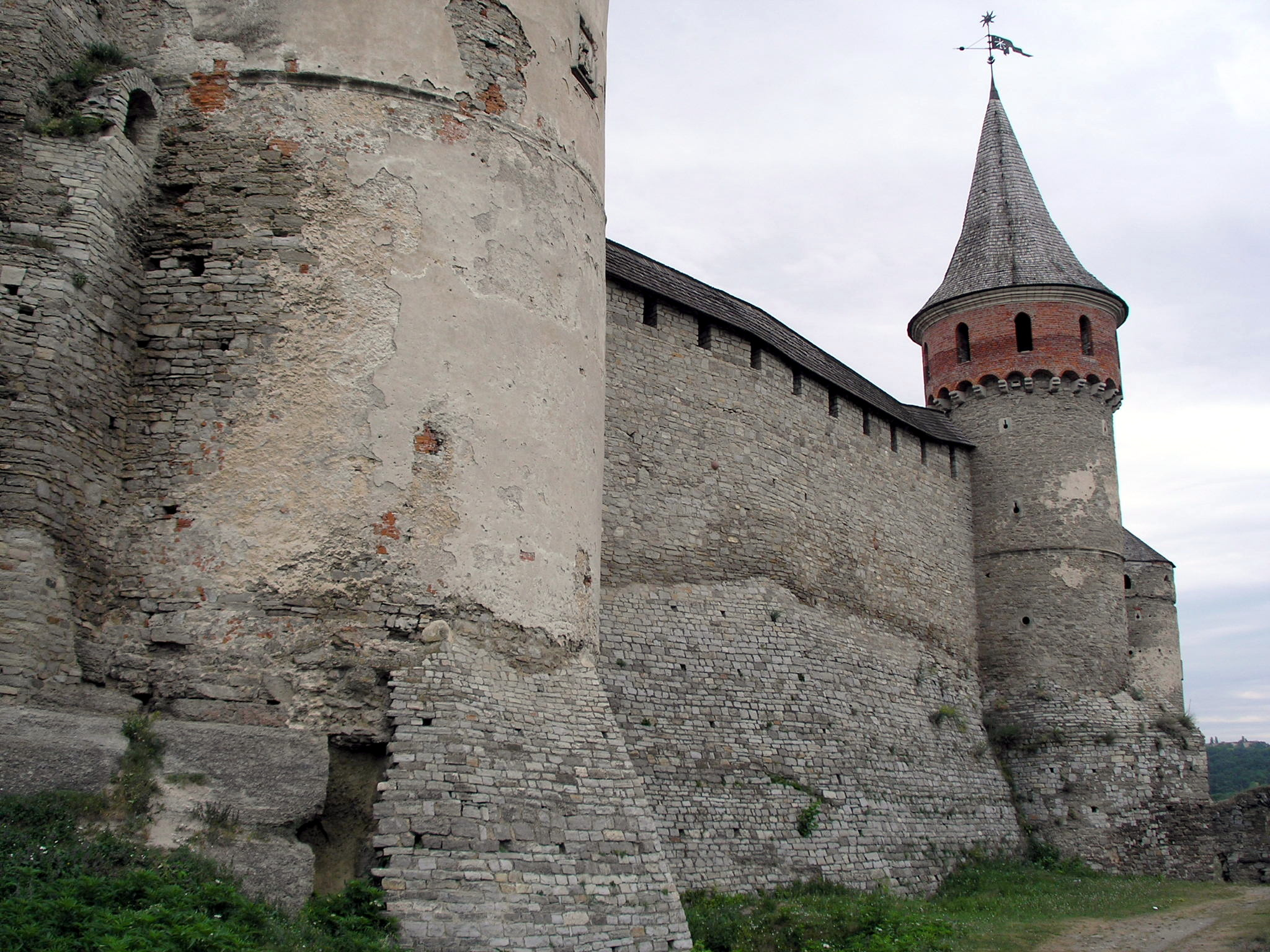
Walls of the Kamianets-Podilskyi Castle

According to the late source, Lithuanian-Ruthenian Chronicle, Algirdas, Grand Prince of Lithuania, defeated the three Tatar princes of Podolia – Kutlug Bey, Hacı Bey and Demetrius – in the Battle of Blue Waters in 1362 or 1363. This information is accepted by some historians It is said that thereafter Algirdas assisted three of the four sons of Karijotas in taking possession of Podolia. The three new rulers of Podolia denied to pay tribute to the Tatars. The chronicle also say that the brothers went hunting and killed many aurochs, moose, deer and wild horses along the Smotrych River; after finishing the hunting, they founded Kamianets-Podilskyi where a fortress was built.

According to analyze of other historians these source mistaken two different events and Vytautas (not Algirdas) defeated these three princes in 1390s and the battle had no connection with Koriatovichs ruling in Podolia. It is said that is no positive evidence to claim that Algirdas take possession of Podolia.

George was listed among the witnesses of two Polish charters, which were issued in 1365 and 1366. When Casimir III invaded "Ruthenia" in July 1366, George and Alexander accompanied him, according to historian Knoll. Knoll and Deletant identify "Duke George" who received Chełm from Casimir III, according to the contemporaneous historian, Jan of Czarnków, with George Koriatovich. Zdzisław Kaczmarczyk and other historians say that "Duke George" was actually George Koriatovich's cousin, George Narimontovich. Both George Koriatovich and George Narimontovich were present at the peace negotiations between Casimir III and the Lithuanian princes.

Even if George ruled in Chełm as Casimir III's vassal, he and his two brothers continued to rule independently in Podolia. According to the Lithuanian-Ruthenian Chronicle, the Vlachs "took prince [George] as their voivode ...". Bogdan Petriceicu Hasdeu published, in 1860, a charter, issued on 3 June 1374, which narrated that "the Lithuanian prince, [George Koriatovich], hospodar of the whole of Moldavia" bestowed a village upon his representative in Maurocastro (Bilhorod-Dnistrovskyi in Ukraine) for the latter's courage in a battle against the Tatars by the Dniester River. The credibility of the charter is subject to scholarly debates.

Neither the Moldavian chronicles nor the list of the voivodes of Moldavia recorded in the Bistrița Monastery refer to George, which implies that he only ruled parts of the developing Principality of Moldavia. On the other hand, Deletant says that George became voivode after the death of Lațcu of Moldavia. According to the Lithuanian-Ruthenian Chronicle, the Vlachs poisoned George. The date of his death is uncertain. Victor Spinei writes that George must have died before his brother, Alexander, confirmed his donation to the Smotrych Monastery on 17 March 1375. Deletant says that George was only murdered shortly before the Lithuanians invaded Moldavia in late 1377, because that invasion was most probably an act of vengeance.

== Footnotes ==
George Koriatovich Gediminid dynasty Died: 1375-1377
Regnal titles
Preceded by Laţcu	Voivode of Moldavia; 1374 – 1375-1377	Succeeded by Peter I Mușat
