= List of Catholic dioceses in Romania =

Unlike most European countries, the Catholic Church in Romania comprises in a single national episcopal conference both Latin and two Eastern Catholic churches (one of which being nation-specific):

- A Latin hierarchy
  - one ecclesiastical province with four suffragan sees
  - an exempt non-metropolitan archdiocese
- Two Eastern Catholic rite-specific particular churches sui iuris:
  - The Romanian Greek Catholic Church (Byzantine Rite (Greek Catholic) in Rumanian language, comprising the Ecclesiastical province of Făgăraş and Alba Iulia, whose Metropolitan Archbishop is the Major Archbishop (almost Patriarch) of the whole rite-specific particular church sui iuris, and all its four Romanian Suffragan Eparchies (dioceses).
  - An Armenian Catholic Ordinariate for Eastern Catholic faithful.

There is also an Apostolic nunciature as papal diplomatic representation (embassy-level) in the national capital Bucharest, into which is also vested the Apostolic nunciature to neighbouring Moldova (Ex-Soviet, ethnic Romanians).

== Current Dioceses ==
=== Latin Hierarchy ===
Administrative map of the Latin and Armenian Catholic hierarchies in Romania

==== Ecclesiastical Province of Bucharest ====
- Metropolitan Archdiocese of Bucharest
  - Diocese of Iași
  - Diocese of Oradea Mare
  - Diocese of Satu Mare
  - Diocese of Timișoara

==== Exempt ====
- Archdiocese of Alba Iulia (sui iuris, not Metropolitan)

=== Eastern Catholic ===
==== Armenian Catholic Church ====
(Armenian Rite in Armenian language)

- Armenian Catholic Ordinariate of Romania, with seat at Gherla

==== Romanian (Greek) Catholic Ecclesiastical Province of Făgăraş and Alba Iulia ====
(Romanian Greek Catholic Church, Romanian language Byzantine (Greek) Rite)

- (Metropolitan) Major Archdiocese of Făgăraș și Alba Iulia
  - Eparchy of Bucharest
  - Eparchy of Cluj-Gherla
  - Eparchy of Lugoj
  - Eparchy of Maramureș
  - Eparchy of Oradea Mare

== Defunct jurisdictions ==
=== Titular see ===
Only the Latin Titular archbishopric (non-Metropolitan) Constantia in Scythia

=== Other defunct Latin jurisdictions ===
(Excluding merely renamed/promoted predecessors of current jurisdictions)

- Latin Diocese of Argeș
- Diocese of Bacău
- Diocese of Milcovia
- Diocese of Moldovița

=== Eastern Catholic defunct jurisdictions ===
- Ruthenian Catholic Apostolic Administration of Targul-Siret (Ruthenian Greek Catholic Church, Byzantine Rite)

== See also ==
- Catholic Church in Romania
- List of Catholic dioceses (structured view)
- the Diocese of Chișinău

== Sources and external links ==
- GCatholic.org.
- Catholic-Hierarchy entry.
